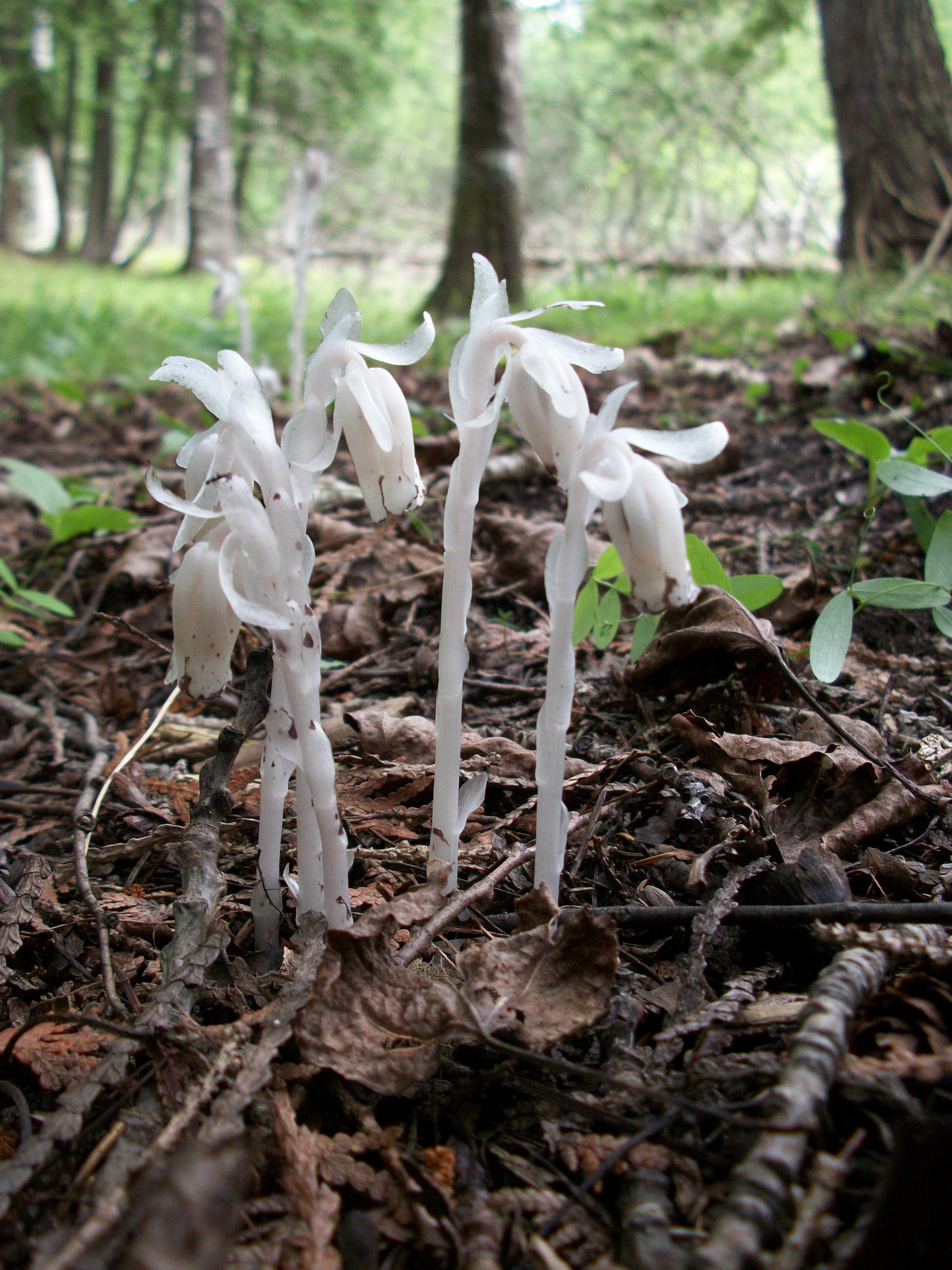
- Monotropa uniflora, northeastern Ohio

Scientific classification
- Kingdom: Plantae
- Clade: Tracheophytes
- Clade: Angiosperms
- Clade: Eudicots
- Clade: Asterids
- Order: Ericales
- Family: Ericaceae
- Subfamily: Monotropoideae
- Tribe: Monotropeae
- Genus: Monotropa; L.

Species
- Monotropa brittonii Small; Monotropa callistoma Wei et al.; Monotropa coccinea Zucc.; Monotropa hypopitys L.; Monotropa uniflora L.

Synonyms
- Hypopitys Hill, nom. superfl.; Monotropion St.-Lag., orth. var.

= Monotropa =

Genus of parasitic flowering plants

Monotropa is a genus of five species of herbaceous perennial flowering plants. The genus was formerly classified in the family Monotropaceae and presently classified in Ericaceae. They are native to temperate regions of the Northern Hemisphere and are generally rare. Unlike most plants, they do not have chlorophyll and therefore are non-photosynthetic; they are myco-heterotrophs that obtain food through parasitism on subterranean fungi. Because they do not need any sunlight to live, they can live in very dark sites such as the floor of deep forest. The name "Monotropa" is Greek for "one turn" as every plant has one large turn near the top of the plant to a drooping tip when the plants are in flower. The type species is Monotropa uniflora.

== Species ==
The genus currently consists of the following five species:

Image	Species	Distribution	Notes
	Monotropa brittonii Small	Southeastern United States (North Carolina to Florida)	Formerly included in M. uniflora, but differs in dryland ecology and parasitism of Lactifluus deceptivus and a few other Lactifluus species. Flowers single per stem, creamy white to salmon-toned.
	Monotropa callistoma Wei et al.	Hunan Province, China	
	Monotropa coccinea Zucc.	Mexico south through Central America to Colombia	Formerly often treated as a subspecies of M. uniflora. Flowers single per stem, bright red.
	Monotropa hypopitys L.	Temperate Holarctic	Flowers multiple per stem, pale yellow to pink.
	Monotropa uniflora L.	Temperate North America and Eastern Asia	Flowers single per stem, white.

Some genetic evidence however suggests that this circumscription is paraphyletic with respect to the related genera Allotropa, Hemitomes, Monotropsis, and Pityopus, and that M. hypopitys should be split out in its own genus; when this is done, its name becomes Hypopitys monotropa Crantz. It differs conspicuously from the other species in the genus in having multiple flowers on each stem, rather than one flower per stem.

== See also ==
- Sarcodes
- Hyobanche
