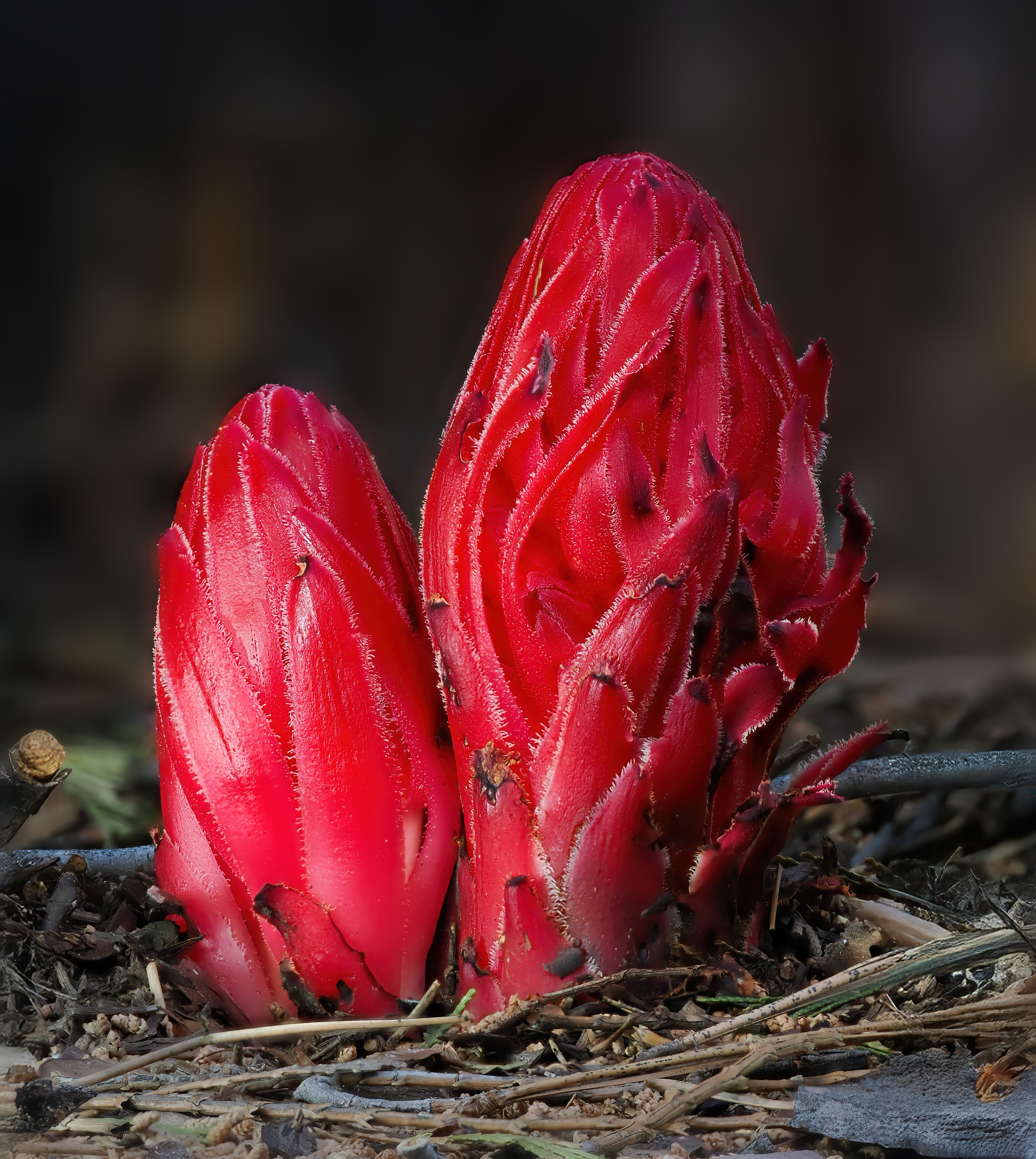

Conservation status
- Secure (NatureServe)

Scientific classification
- Kingdom: Plantae
- Clade: Tracheophytes
- Clade: Angiosperms
- Clade: Eudicots
- Clade: Asterids
- Order: Ericales
- Family: Ericaceae
- Subfamily: Monotropoideae
- Tribe: Pterosporeae
- Genus: Sarcodes; Torr.
- Species: S. sanguinea

Binomial name
- Sarcodes sanguinea Torr.

= Sarcodes =

Genus of parasitic flowering plants

Sarcodes is a monotypic genus of flowering plants in the heath family (Ericaceae) native to northwest North America, containing the single species Sarcodes sanguinea, commonly called the snow plant or snow flower. It is a parasitic plant that derives sustenance and nutrients from mycorrhizal fungi that attach to tree roots. Lacking chlorophyll, it is unable to photosynthesize. Ectomycorrhizal (EM) symbioses involve a mutualism between a plant root and a fungus; the plant provides fixed carbon to the fungus and in return, the fungus provides mineral nutrients, water, and protection from pathogens to the plant. The snow plant takes advantage of this mutualism by tapping into the network and stealing sugars from the photosynthetic partner by way of the fungus. This is known as mycoheterotrophy. The snow plant is host-specific and can only form relationships with the ectomycorrhizal Basidiomycete Rhizopogon ellenae.

The plant's aboveground tissue is its inflorescence, a raceme of bright scarlet red flowers wrapped in many strap-like, pointed bracts with fringed edges, themselves bright red to orange in color.

S. sanguinea is native to montane areas of the California Floristic Province, from the Oregon Cascade Range (as far north as the Umpqua River), through the mountains of California including the Transverse Ranges (though it is absent from the California Coast Ranges between the Klamath Mountains), and into the Sierra de San Pedro Mártir range of northern Baja California.

Its species epithet sanguinea refers to the striking red flower that emerges from the sometimes still snow-covered ground in early spring or summer; this may be as late as July in high elevations, such as those of the High Sierra Nevada and Cascades. The genus epithet Sarcodes comes from the Greek sarkódes (σαρκώδες), meaning "fleshy".

According to botanist James L. Reveal, S. sanguinea is edible, if cooked. The root is said to have a texture and flavor similar to asparagus.

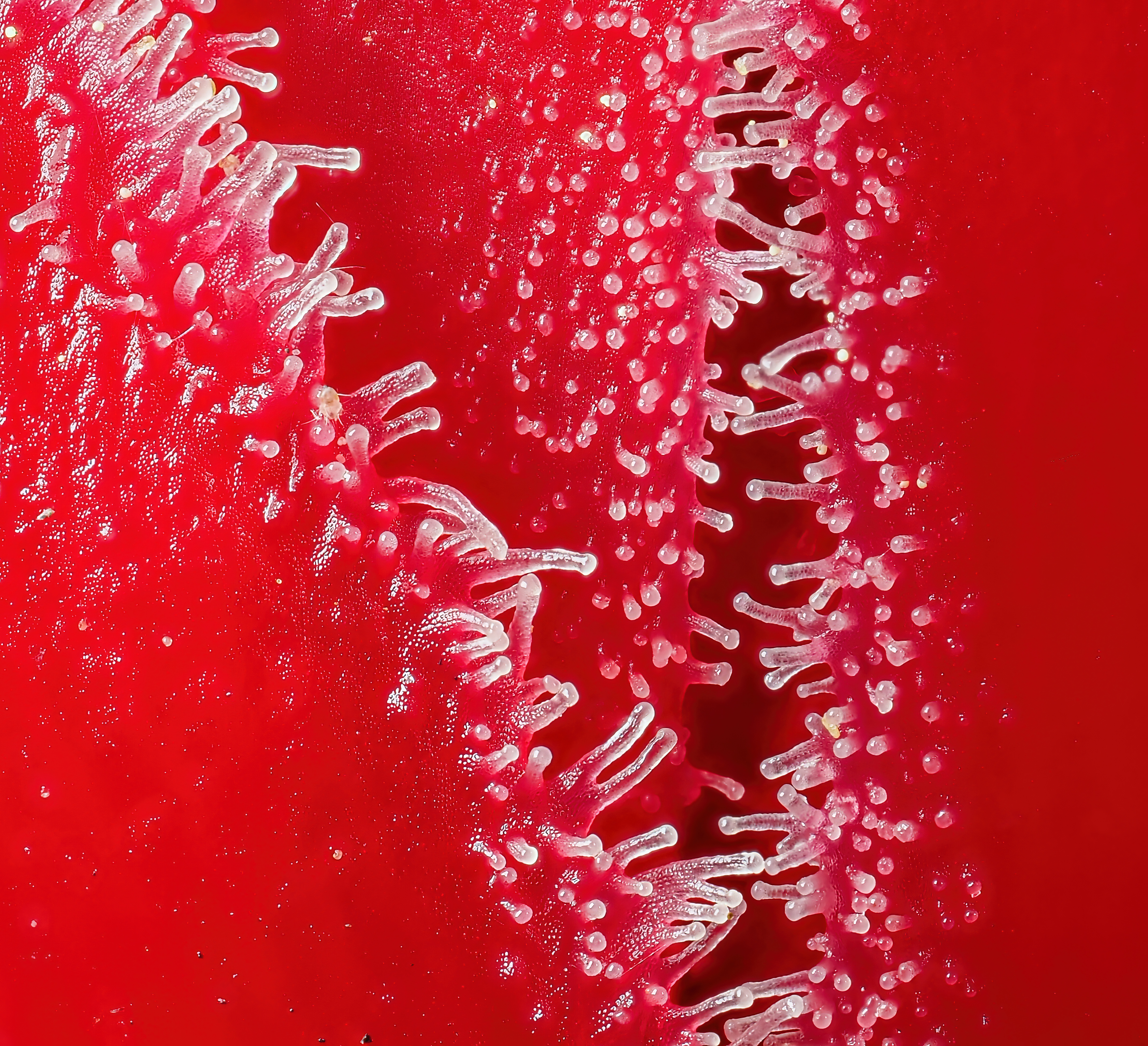
Sarcodes sanguinea closeup showing trichomes

== History ==
Reportedly the first account of Sarcodes sanguinea, John Torrey's Plantæ Frémontianæ is a result of the collection of Sarcodes by John C. Frémont in the Central Valley, north of the Sacramento–San Joaquin River Delta, in the area of the Yuba River in 1853. In Plantæ Frémontianæ, Torrey gives a detailed description of Sarcodes and provides the first figures of the plant. He also incorrectly states that Sarcodes is unique to California. Another early report of S. sanguinea is attributed to Gaspard Adolphe Chatin whose 1862 description did not differ from Torrey's.

Already in 1888 Henry John Elwes thought the snow plant (Sarcodes sanguinea) the main object of an excursion into the pine forest above San Bernardino. He describes the plant in some detail.

=== In writing ===
Due to its unique and striking appearance, coupled with its relatively limited geographic distribution, S. sanguinea has been a popular subject of various California naturalists. In his 1912 book, The Yosemite, famed nature writer John Muir wrote a description of Sarcodes;

The snow plant (Sarcodes sanguinea) is more admired by tourists than any other in California. It is red, fleshy, and watery and looks like a gigantic asparagus shoot. Soon after the snow is off the ground, it rises through the dead needles and humus in the pine and fir woods like a bright glowing pillar of fire.... It is said to grow up through the snow; on the contrary, it always waits until the ground is warm, though with other early flowers it is occasionally buried or half-buried for a day or two by spring storms.... Nevertheless, it is a singularly cold and unsympathetic plant. Everybody admires it as a wonderful curiosity, but nobody loves it as lilies, violets, roses, daisies are loved. Without fragrance, it stands beneath the pines and firs lonely and silent, as if unacquainted with any other plant in the world; never moving in the wildest storms; rigid as if lifeless, though covered with beautiful rosy flowers.

In 1939, former University of California, Berkeley professor William Whittingham Lyman Jr. published a poem book called California Wild Flowers, in which he dedicated a poem to "The Snow Plant";

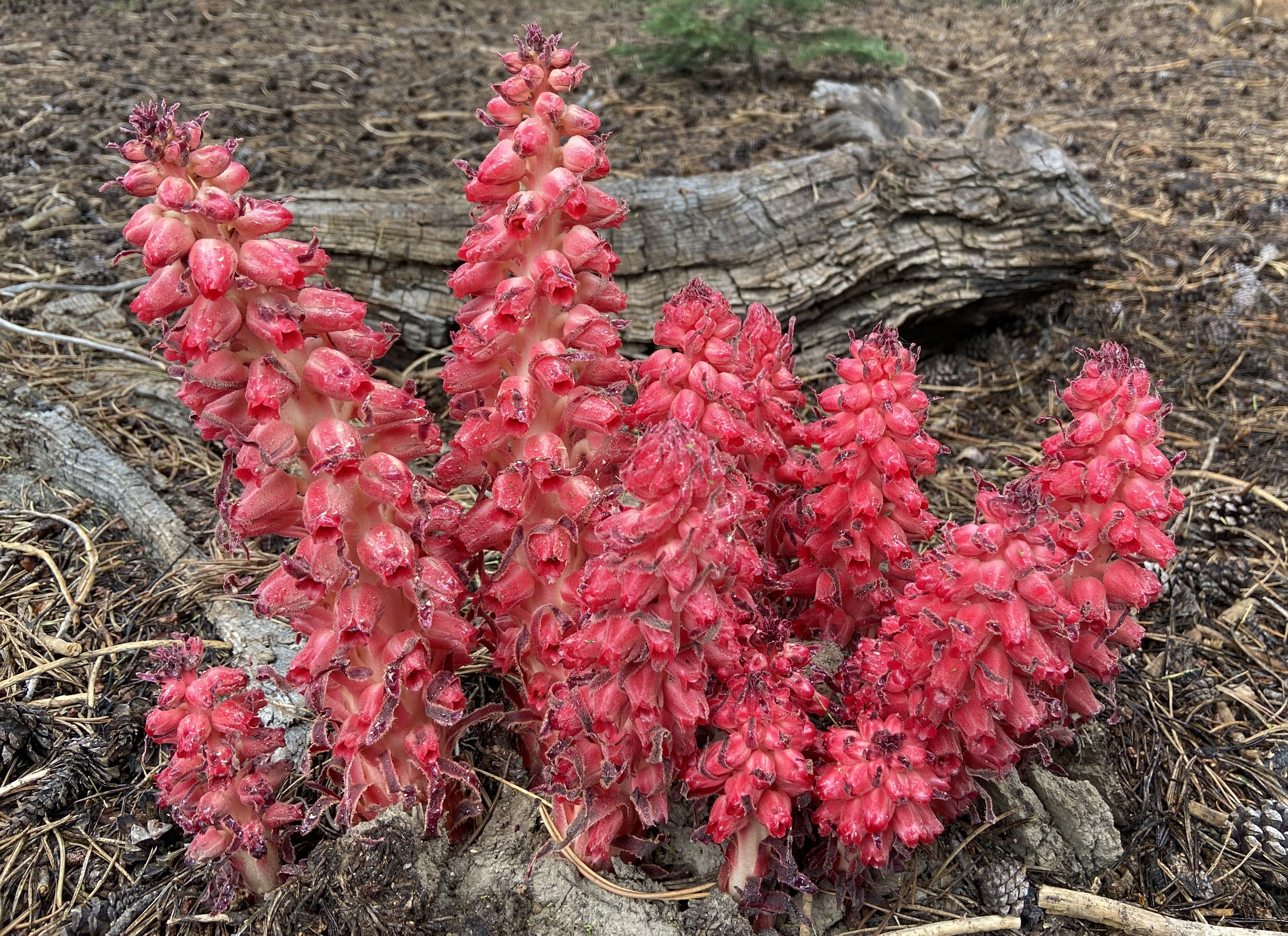
Stand of Sarcodes near Donner Lake

Are you a blood red hyacinth
Transported strangely
To these cold Sierra solitudes?
But hyacinths have leaves,
While you are leafless,
And thick and waxy
And blood-red everywhere.
Who would suppose
That the delicate tinted heather
Is your cousin?

== See also ==
- Monotropa
- Hyobanche
