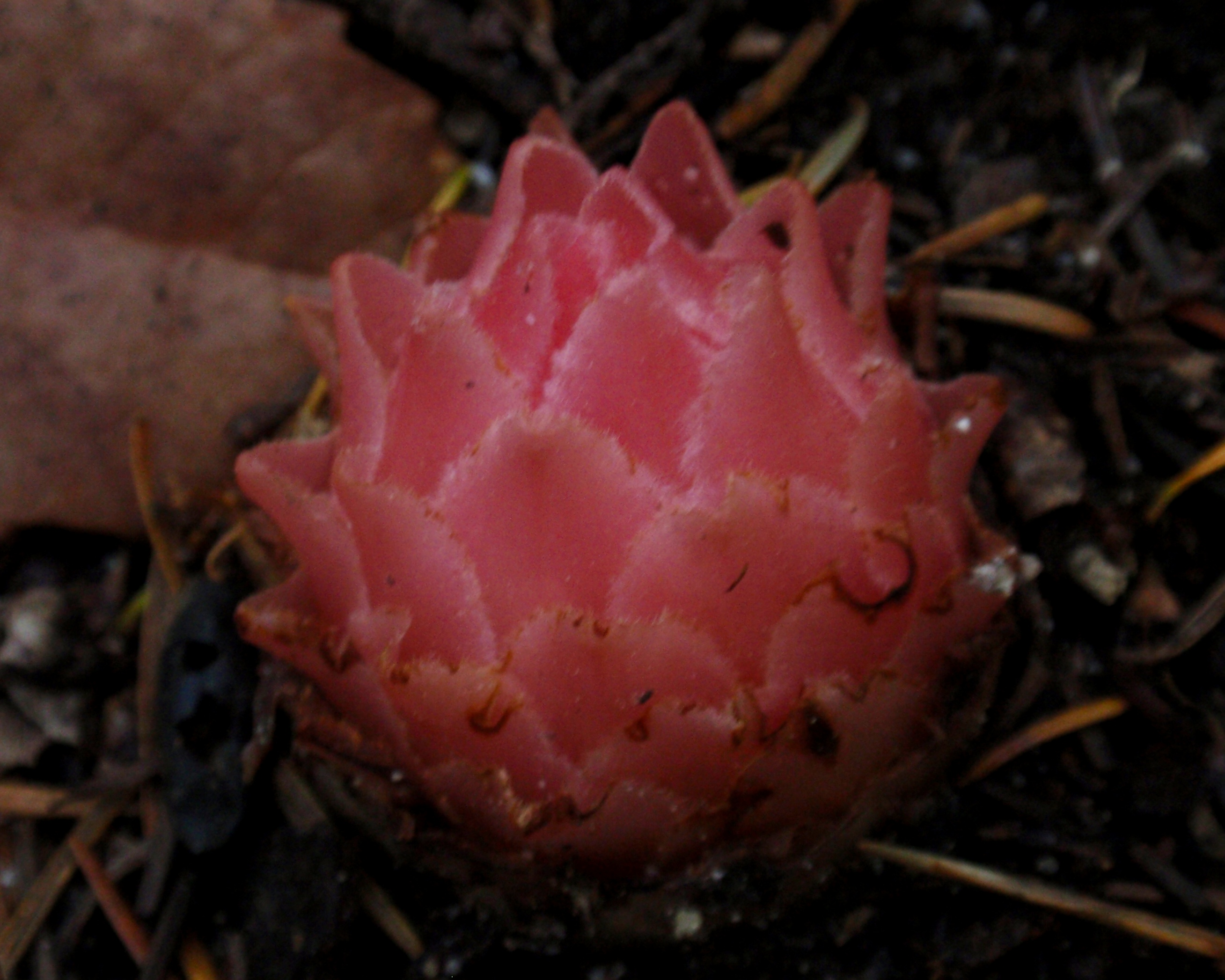

Scientific classification
- Kingdom: Plantae
- Clade: Tracheophytes
- Clade: Angiosperms
- Clade: Eudicots
- Clade: Asterids
- Order: Ericales
- Family: Ericaceae
- Subfamily: Monotropoideae
- Tribe: Monotropeae
- Genus: Pleuricospora; A.Gray
- Species: P. fimbriolata

Binomial name
- Pleuricospora fimbriolata A.Gray

= Pleuricospora =

Genus of flowering plants

Pleuricospora is a monotypic genus of flowering plants in the family Ericaceae containing the single species Pleuricospora fimbriolata, which is known by the common name fringed pinesap. It is native to the forests of the west coast of North America from British Columbia to the San Francisco Bay Area. This perennial herb is a mycoheterotroph, parasitizing fungi for nutrients. It is yellowish, cream or white in color, lacking chlorophyll, with the tips of the bracts darkening with age. It produces a fleshy stemless peduncle above the leaf litter of the forest floor, reaching no more than 10 to 12 centimeters tall. Leaves are reduced to scales or absent, as the plant does not perform photosynthesis. The aboveground portion of the plant is essentially just inflorescence, with cylindrical whitish flowers blooming for a short time. The flower has four or five petals and about eight stamens in its throat. It produces a fleshy berry under a centimeter wide containing many tiny, sticky seeds. The seeds are dispersed when small mammals eat the fruits.
