= Saprophytes =

Saprophyte may refer to:

- Saprotrophs; organisms, particularly fungi, which obtain nutrients directly from dead organic matter or wastes
- Myco-heterotrophs; plants, fungi, or micro-organisms that live on dead or decomposing matter and parasitize fungi, rather than dead organic matter directly.
