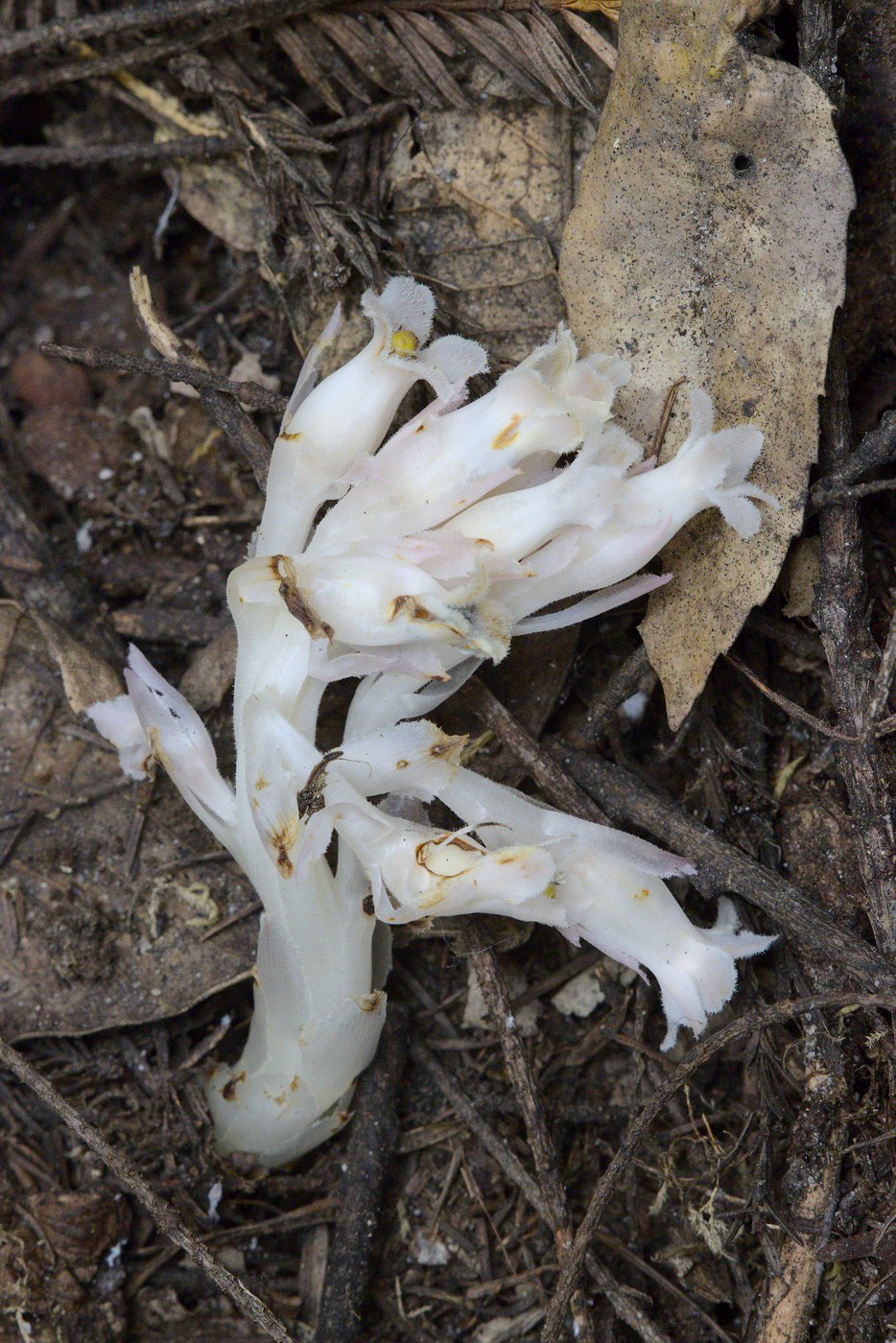

Scientific classification
- Kingdom: Plantae
- Clade: Tracheophytes
- Clade: Angiosperms
- Clade: Eudicots
- Clade: Asterids
- Order: Ericales
- Family: Ericaceae
- Subfamily: Monotropoideae
- Tribe: Monotropeae
- Genus: Pityopus; Small
- Species: P. californicus

Binomial name
- Pityopus californicus (Eastw.) Copeland f.

= Pityopus =

Genus of flowering plants in the heath family Ericaceae

Pityopus is a monotypic genus of flowering plants in the family Ericaceae containing the single species Pityopus californicus, which is known by the common name pinefoot.

== Distribution ==
The plant is native to the mountains of the West Coast of the United States below 1,800 meters (5,900 ft) in elevation, from Washington to the Bay Area in California. It is uncommon throughout its range.

It grows in coniferous and mixed forest types. Habitats include mixed evergreen forest, yellow pine forest, red fir forest, and coastal coniferous forest.

== Description ==
Pityopus californicus, a perennial herb, is a mycoheterotroph, parasitizing fungi for nutrients. It is cream or white in color, lacking chlorophyll. It is the smallest mycotroph in the heath family.

It produces a fleshy stemless peduncle above the leaf litter of the forest floor, reaching no more than 10 centimeters tall. It is covered with scale-like leaves, reduced as they do not perform photosynthesis.

The above ground portion of the plant is essentially just inflorescence, with 2 to 11 cylindrical white flowers blooming for a short time. The flower has four or five white petals and a hairy throat. The bloom period is May to July.

It produces a berry under a centimeter wide containing many seeds. The mature plant has a scent reminiscent of Brie cheese, which may serve to attract pollinators. After fruiting the plant withers away until the following flowering season.
