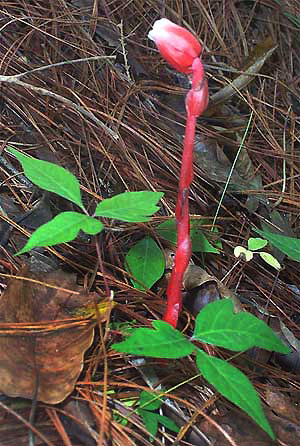
- Monotropa coccinea amidst poison ivy leaves

Scientific classification
- Kingdom: Plantae
- Clade: Embryophytes
- Clade: Tracheophytes
- Clade: Angiosperms
- Clade: Eudicots
- Clade: Asterids
- Order: Ericales
- Family: Ericaceae
- Genus: Monotropa
- Species: M. coccinea

Binomial name
- Monotropa coccinea Zucc.

Synonyms
- List: Monotropa uniflora subsp. coccinea(Zucc.) Andres; Monotropa uniflora var. coccinea (Zucc.)Domin; Monotropa australis Andres; Monotropa coccinea var. mexicana Lange; Monotropa coccinea var. nicaraguensis Lange; Monotropa uniflora var. australis (Andres) Domin; Monotropa uniflora var. nicaraguensis Lange; Monotropa uniflora var. variegata Andres; Monotropa uniflora subvar. variegata (Andres) Domin

= Monotropa coccinea =

Species of plant

Monotropa coccinea, sometimes called red Indian pipe, is a species of obligately parastic plant occurring in the Neotropical realm. It belongs to the family Ericaceae.

== Description ==
Monotropa coccinea is like the much better documented Monotropa uniflora, except that it is bright red and occurs in tropical America, not in the USA. Both taxa have such a unique appearance that usually these few field marks suffice for the species' identification:

- They do not photosynthesize, so have no green parts.
- Their stem-like inflorescences arising from the ground bear only one flower.

== Distribution ==
Monotropa coccinea occurs in Mexico, Central America, and Colombia in South America.

== Habitat ==
In highland central Mexico, treating the species as M. uniflora, M. coccinea occurs in association with various pine trees in cloud forests. In El Salvador the species also inhabits cloud forests of various kinds.

=== Fungal associations ===
Monotropa coccinea, like other Monotropa species, is parasitic on a fungus which is in a symbiotic relationship with a tree. In highland central Mexico the principal fungi associated with the occurrence of Monotropa coccinea among its pine trees appear to be those which are mycorrhizal species of the fungus family Russulaceae, and within that family there's a strong preference for species of the genus Russula.

== Taxonomy ==
The big taxonomic question about Monotropa coccinea is this: Is it different from Monotropa uniflora? In 2026, the main taxonomic authorities list Monotropa coccinea as a distinct species. They appear to be guided by a 2004 study in which molecular phylogenetic analysis found that "... Monotropa uniflora from Central America is molecularly diverged and phylogenetically distinct from North American representatives." Still, in 2026, some authorities made clear that they treated Monotropa coccinea as distinct only "tentatively", until more studies are published.

The taxon Monotropa coccinea was named and described formally in 1832 by Joseph Gerhard Zuccarini. The type specimen was noted as from the Mexican Empire, and it had been preserved in "spirits of wine", or distilled ethanol (... "spiritu vini servatam").

=== Etymology ===
The genus name Monotropa is from the Greek monos meaning "one," and tropos, meaning "turn or direction", alluding to the flowers turning in one direction.

The species name coccinea is New Latin based on the Greek kokkinos meaning "scarlet-colored".
