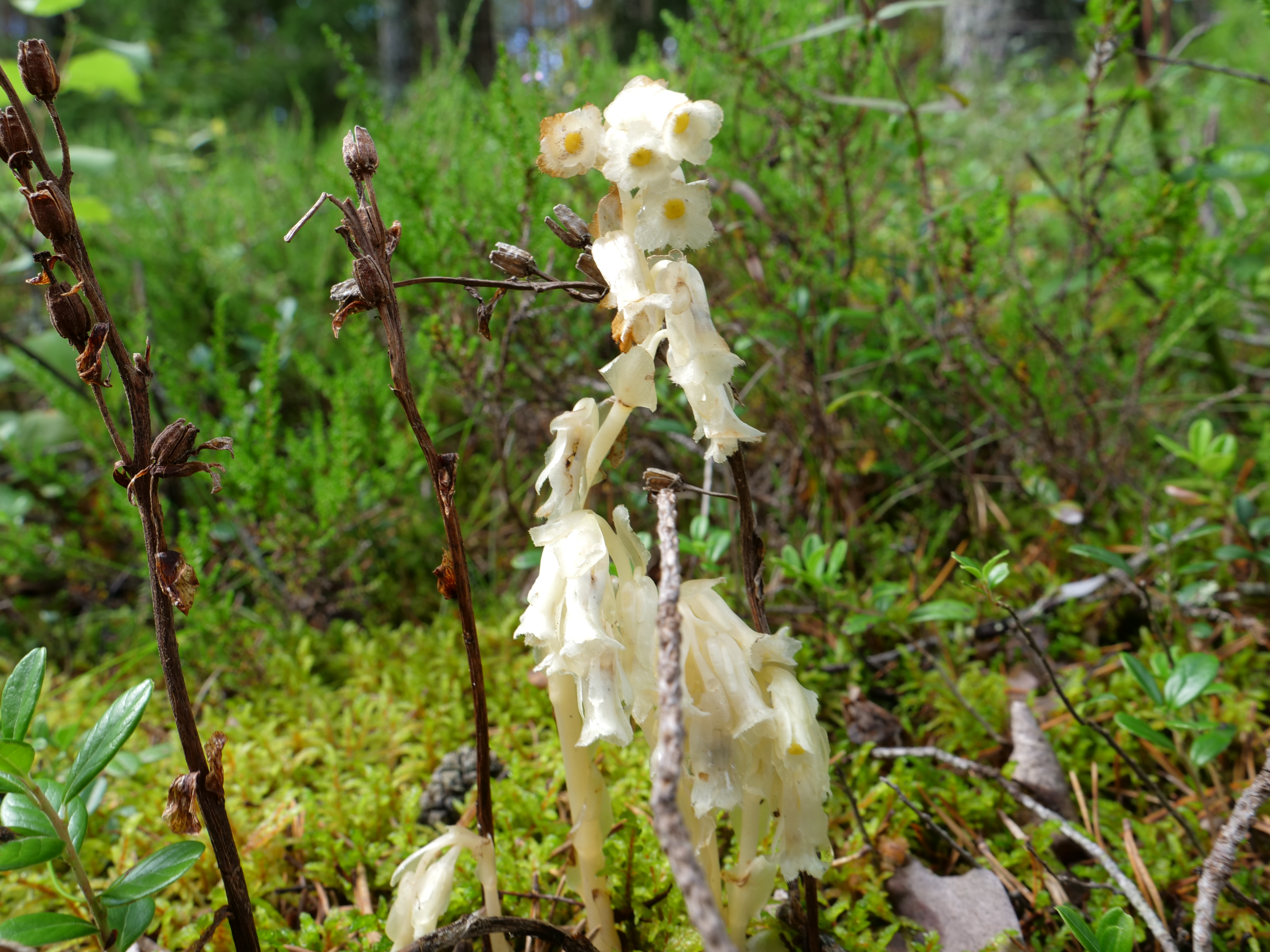
- Monotropa hypopitys in Örebro län, Sweden

Conservation status
- Secure (NatureServe)

Scientific classification
- Kingdom: Plantae
- Clade: Tracheophytes
- Clade: Angiosperms
- Clade: Eudicots
- Clade: Asterids
- Order: Ericales
- Family: Ericaceae
- Genus: Monotropa
- Species: M. hypopitys

Binomial name
- Monotropa hypopitys L.

= Monotropa hypopitys =

Species of flowering plant in the heath family

Monotropa hypopitys, syn. Hypopitys monotropa, also known as yellow bird's nest in Britain and Ireland, pinesap and false beechdrops in Canada and the United States, is a herbaceous perennial plant of the Monotropoideae subfamily of the family Ericaceae. It is native to temperate regions of the Northern Hemisphere and is scarce within its range. M. hypopitys is a mycotrophic plant which means it obtains nutrients and fixed carbon by parasitizing the mycorrhizal networks of trees. It lacks chlorophyll and does not photosynthesize. The species name, M. hypopitys, is from Latinized Greek hypo-, "under", and pitys, "pine", referring to where it often grows.

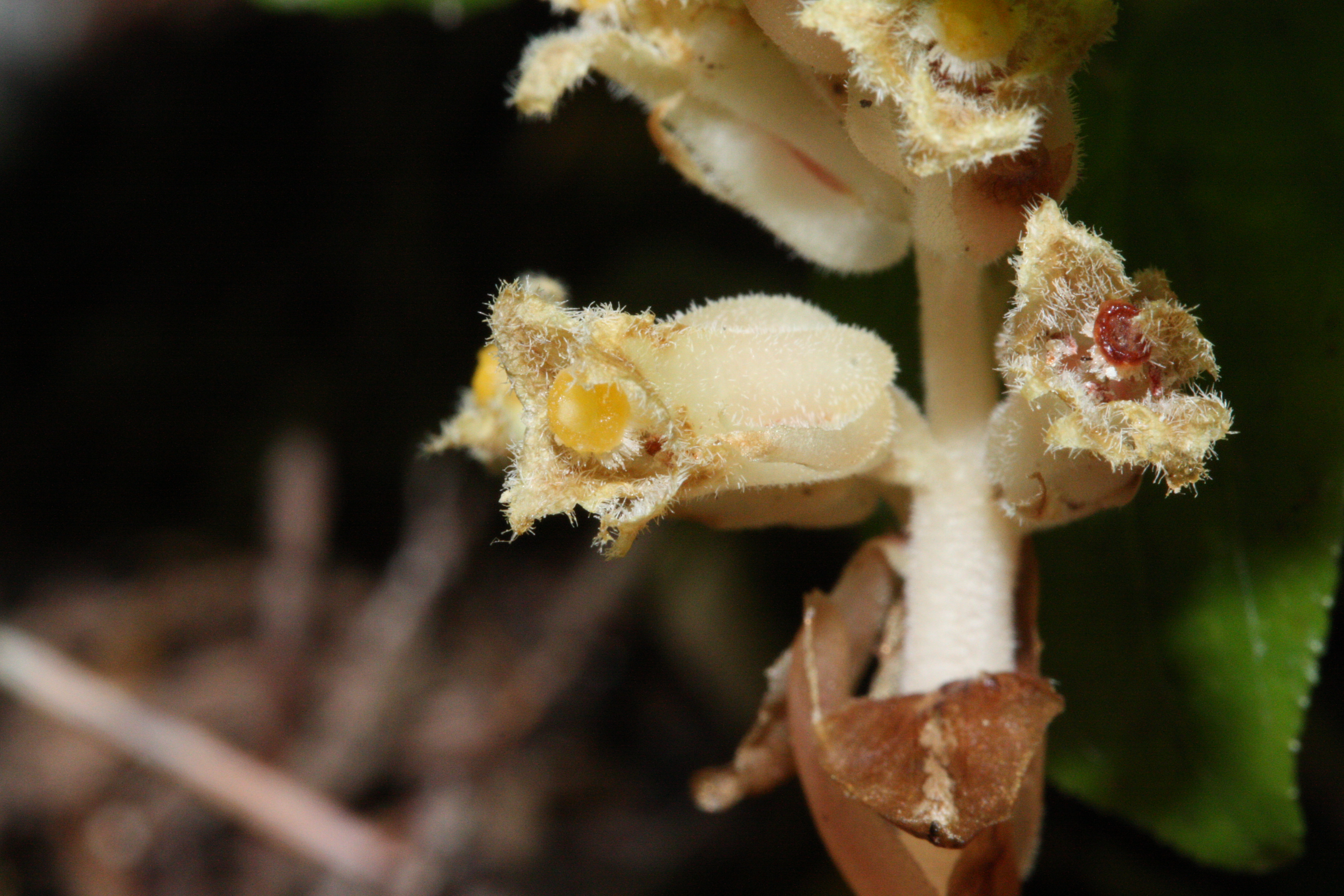
The pink to cream flower, with four to five petals, is borne on a short stalk.

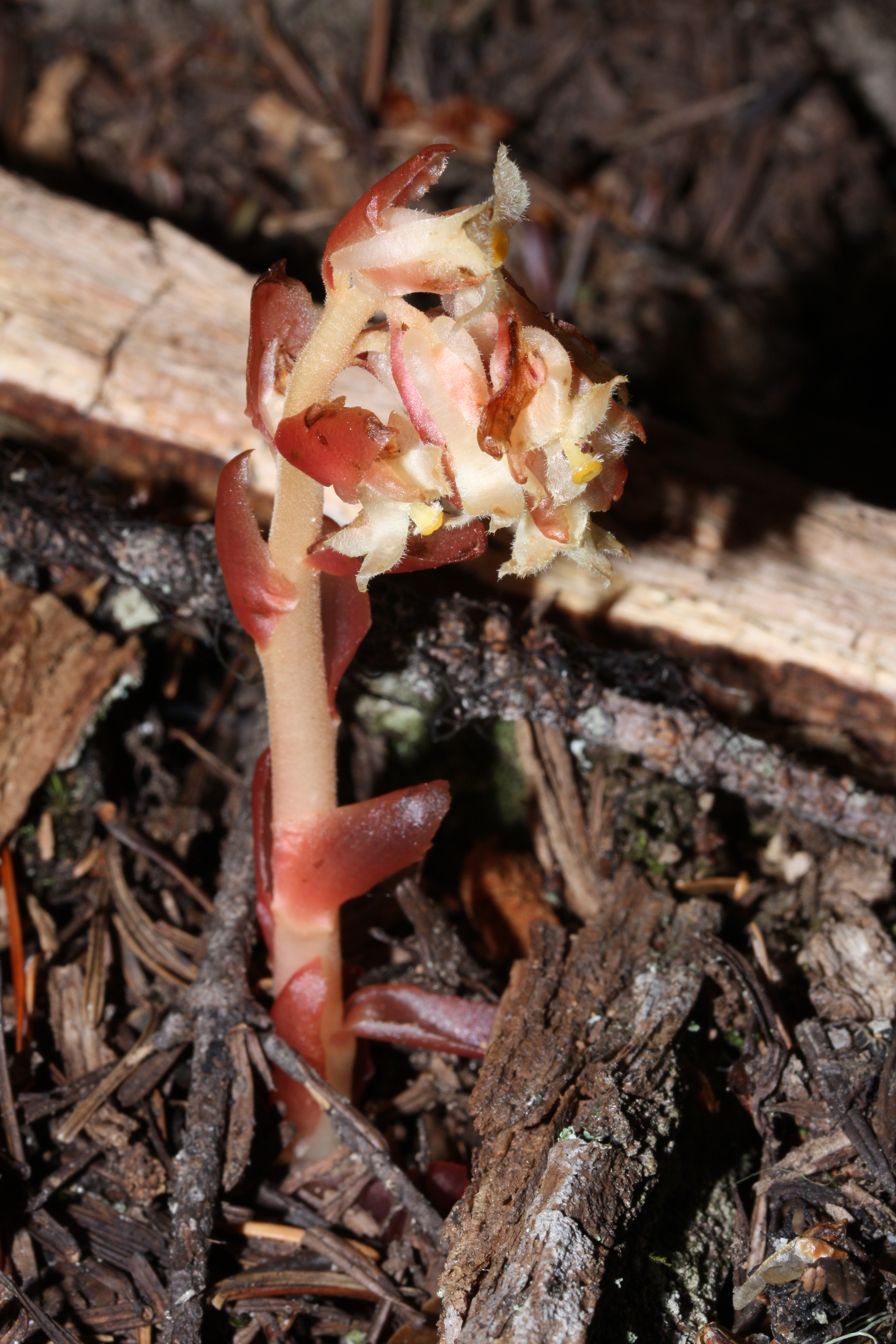
Monotropa hypopitys in Henry M. Jackson Wilderness, Washington

== Physical description ==
M. hypopitys is a fleshy dicot that grows to 10–35 cm (3.9–13.8 in) tall. True stems are nonexistent; instead, the only part which emerges from the soil are unbranched, adventitious inflorescences developmentally similar to adventitious roots. The bracts are 5–10 mm long scale-like structures, which cover most of the inflorescence. It has cosexual flowers that are pendulous when young, but become erect when they begin to mature into the fruit which is a capsule. Flowers are 9–12 mm long and produced in a cluster of 1–11 together at the apex of the raceme inflorescence. The seeds are very small, weighing only 0.000003 of a gram. M. hypopitys has several color morphs, including yellow, red, and yellowish-white. It is frequently mistaken for a fungus due to its unique, fungus-like physical characteristics.

== Parasitism ==
Unlike autotrophs, mycotrophs like Monotropa hypopitys, cannot make their own food. Instead, they exploit the mutualism between mycorrhizal networks and trees. By penetrating fungal hyphae, M. hypopitys siphons off resources. M. hypopitys often parasitizes the hyphae associated with oak and pine trees. It also displays host specificity for Tricholoma fungi.

== Distribution ==
Monotropa hypopitys is the most widespread member of its subfamily (Monotropoideae). Outside of North America, its wide distribution includes India, China, Pakistan, Russia, and much of Europe. In the United States, the heath family (Ericaceae) mycotrophic species are most common in the western mixed coniferous forests. M. hypopitys distribution is influenced by the host distribution, specifically that of Tricholoma fungi.

== Reproductive ecology and phenology ==
M. hypopitys flowering phenology typically ranges from April to December but is dependent on the geographic region and flower morph. Its two dominant color forms, red and yellow, have non-overlapping reproductive phenologies. The yellow form blooms in mid-summer while the red morph is known to flower in the fall. While both forms are self-compatible, the yellow form has higher rates of autogamous reproduction. Pollinator diversity within the Monotropa genus is low with bumblebees being the predominant pollen dispersal agent. The red and yellow morphs also have distinct floral systems with the red form displaying approach herkogamy. The yellow form is devoid of the spatial separation of reproductive structures associated with herkogamy.

== Evolutionary history ==
M. hypopitys non-photosynthetic nature is attributed to its significantly reduced chloroplast genome. When it was originally classified, only two species, M. hypopitys and M. uniflora, made up the Monotropa genus. Recent analysis of morphological characteristics and genetic information suggests that M. hypopitys is more closely related to the other members of the Monotropoideae subfamily than it is to M. uniflora.
