= Corpse plant =

Corpse plant is a common name for several flowering plants and may refer to:

- Amorphophallus titanum, a plant with a rancid smell
- Monotropa uniflora, a wholly white plant without chlorophyll
