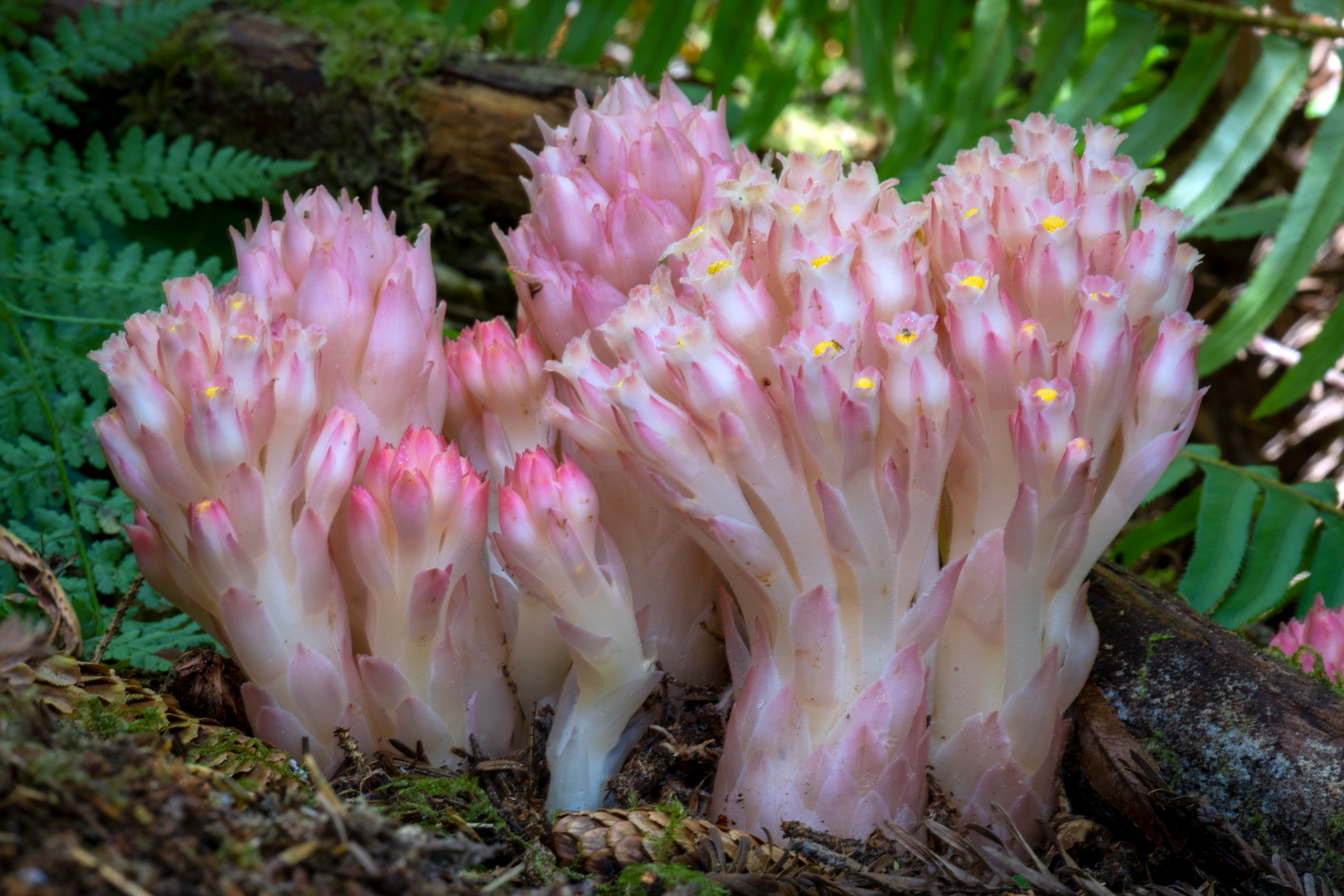

Scientific classification
- Kingdom: Plantae
- Clade: Embryophytes
- Clade: Tracheophytes
- Clade: Spermatophytes
- Clade: Angiosperms
- Clade: Eudicots
- Clade: Asterids
- Order: Ericales
- Family: Ericaceae
- Subfamily: Monotropoideae
- Tribe: Monotropeae
- Genus: Hemitomes; A.Gray
- Species: H. congestum

Binomial name
- Hemitomes congestum A.Gray

Synonyms
- Newberrya congesta

= Hemitomes =

Genus of flowering plants

Hemitomes is a monotypic genus of plants containing the single species Hemitomes congestum, which is known as gnome plant and cone plant. This rare and unusual plant is native to the west coast of North America from British Columbia to California, where it grows in dense, dark forests such as the redwood and Douglas-fir forests of the region. This is a small, fleshy, stemless perennial plant forming lumps in the leaf litter. It is white, yellowish, or reddish-pink in color, like Monotropa and other close relatives, little is known about the life cycle of the plant due to its rarity, but it probably obtains its nutrients by parasitizing fungi, that are part of the Russulaceae, in a similar manner to the rest of its tribe of the Monotropeae, so it lacks the green of chlorophyll. It grows from a rhizome with fragile roots and its form is covered in sparse scales which are the rudimentary leaves. An inflorescence emerges on a thick stalk from the soil bearing solitary to densely bunched flowers. The flowers have ragged yellowish or pinkish petals and contain hairs and large rounded yellow stigmas. The fruit is a fleshy white berry.

== Distribution ==
The native range of this species is British Columbia to California. It is a holomycotrophic perennial and grows primarily in the temperate biome.

== Description ==
Hemitomes congestum is a chlorophyll-less, myco-heterotrophic herb. Its roots are fibrous; the shoot and inflorescence axis that sprouts from them is upright and creamy white to reddish. The leaves are simple, and bracteoles are absent. The roots are thin and white.

The inflorescence is one to multiple flowers; branching is possible. The flowers are four, rarely up to sixfold. The crown is tubular to bell-shaped, the petals are fused together. The stamens are about two-thirds as long as the crown, the anthers do not turn and are slotted lengthwise. The stylus is permanent, the stigma widened.

The ovary is eightfold and has parietal placentation. The fruit is berry-like, the seeds are elliptical and thick-skinned.
