= Parasitic plant =

Type of plant

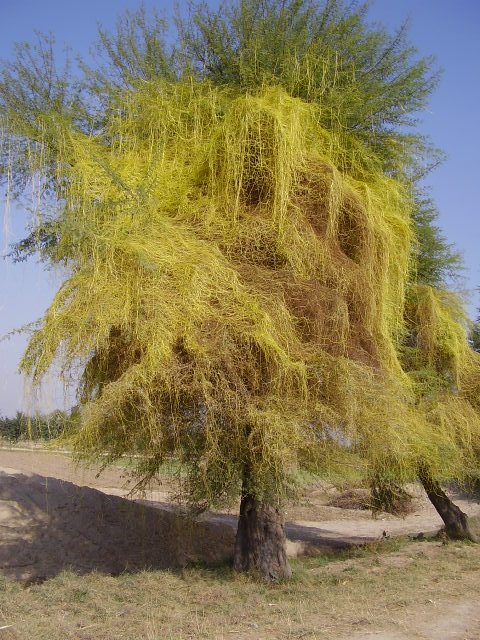
Cuscuta, a stem holoparasite, on an Acacia tree in Pakistan

A parasitic plant is a plant that derives some or all of its nutritional requirements from another living plant. They make up about 1% of angiosperms and are found in almost every biome. All parasitic plants develop a specialized organ called the haustorium, which penetrates the host plant, connecting them to the host vasculature—either the xylem, phloem, or both. For example, plants like Striga or Rhinanthus connect only to the xylem, via xylem bridges (xylem-feeding). Alternately, plants like Cuscuta and some members of Orobanche connect to both the xylem and phloem of the host. This provides them with the ability to extract resources from the host. These resources can include water, nitrogen, carbon and/or sugars.

Parasitic plants are classified depending on the location where the parasitic plant latches onto the host (root or stem), the amount of nutrients it requires, and their photosynthetic capability. Some parasitic plants can locate their host plants by detecting volatile chemicals in the air or soil given off by host shoots or roots, respectively. About 4,500 species of parasitic plants in approximately 20 families of flowering plants are known.

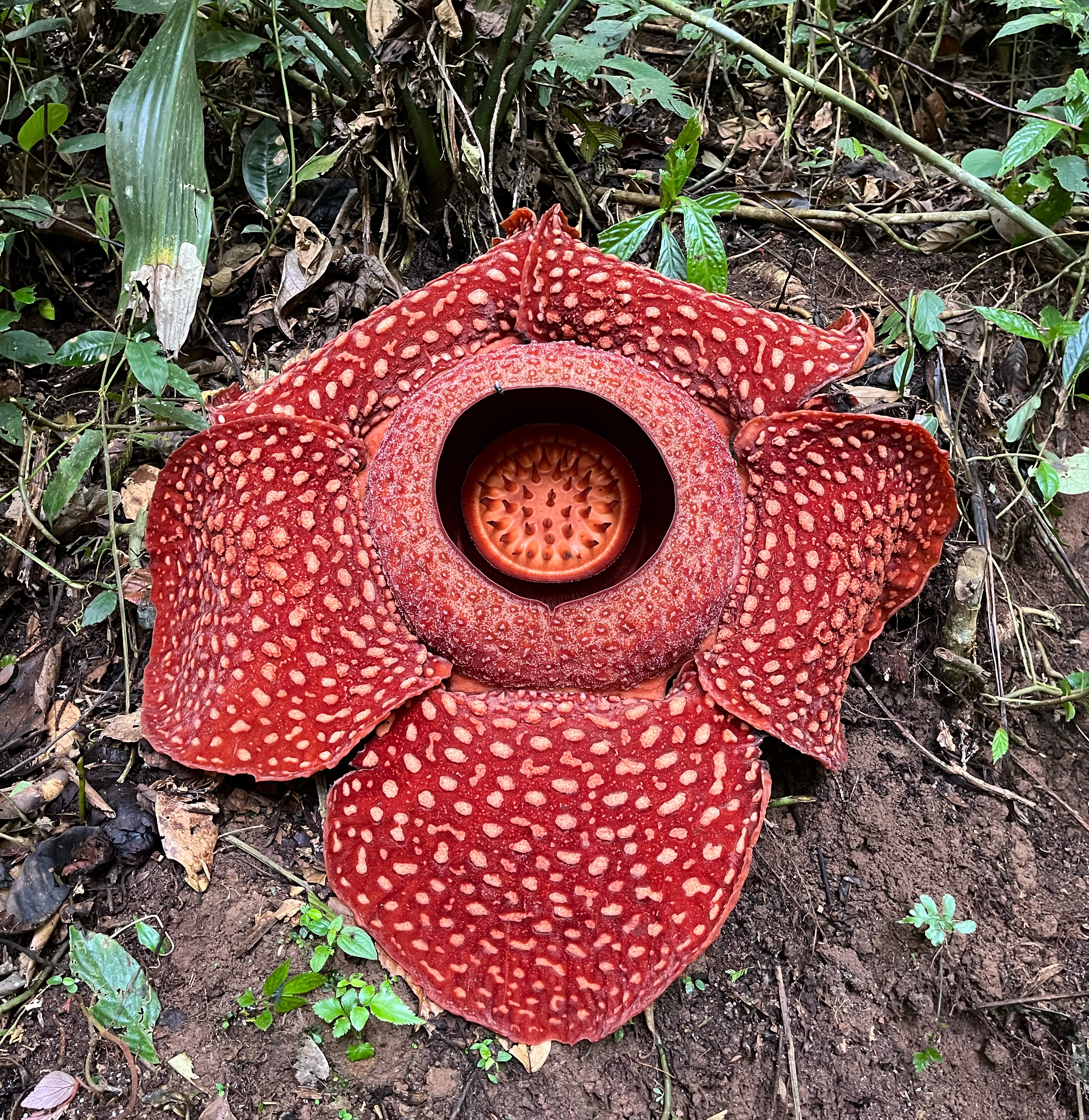
Rafflesia arnoldii is another type of parasitic plant.

There is a wide range of effects that may occur to a host plant due to the presence of a parasitic plant. Often there is a pattern of stunted growth in hosts especially in hemi-parasitic cases, but may also result in higher mortality rates in host plant species following introduction of larger parasitic plant populations.

== Classification ==
Parasitic plants occur in multiple plant families, indicating that the evolution of parasitism is polyphyletic and independently evolved multiple times. Some families consist mostly of parasitic representatives such as Balanophoraceae, while other families have only a few representatives. One example is the North American Monotropa uniflora (Indian pipe or corpse plant) which is a member of the heath family, Ericaceae, better known for its member blueberries, cranberries, and rhododendrons.

Parasitic plants are characterized as follows:

1	a	Obligate	An obligate parasite cannot complete its life cycle without a host.
1	b	Facultative	A facultative parasite can complete its life cycle independent of a host.
2	a	Stem	A stem parasite attaches to the host stem.
2	b	Root	A root parasite attaches to the host root.
3	a	Hemi-	A hemiparasitic plant lives as a parasite under natural conditions, but remains photosynthetic to at least some degree. Hemiparasites may obtain only water and mineral nutrients from the host plant, or many also obtain a part of their organic nutrients from the host.
3	b	Holo-	A holoparasitic plant derives all of its fixed carbon from the host plant. Commonly lacking chlorophyll, holoparasites are often colors that are not green.

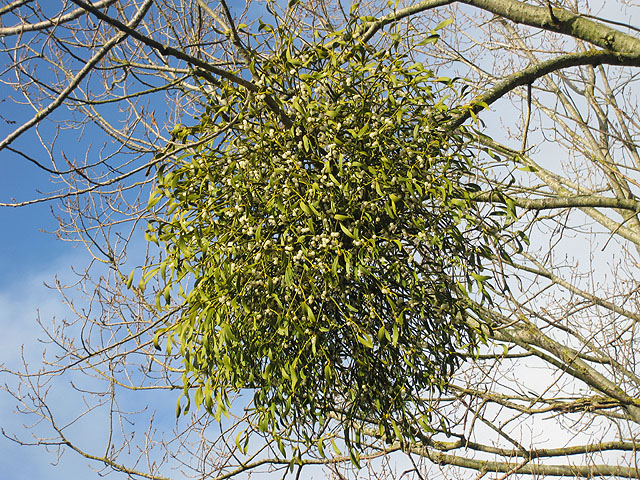
Mistletoe, an obligate stem hemiparasite

For hemiparasites, one from each of the three sets of terms can be applied to the same species, e.g.

- Nuytsia floribunda (Western Australian Christmas tree) is an obligate root hemiparasite.
- Rhinanthus (e.g. Yellow rattle) is a facultative root hemiparasite.
- Mistletoe is an obligate stem hemiparasite.

Holoparasites are always obligate so only two terms are needed, e.g.

- Dodder is a stem holoparasite.
- Hydnora spp. are root holoparasites.

Plants usually considered holoparasites include broomrape, dodder, Rafflesia, and the Hydnoraceae. Plants usually considered hemiparasites include Castilleja, mistletoe, Western Australian Christmas tree, and yellow rattle.

== Evolution of parasitism ==
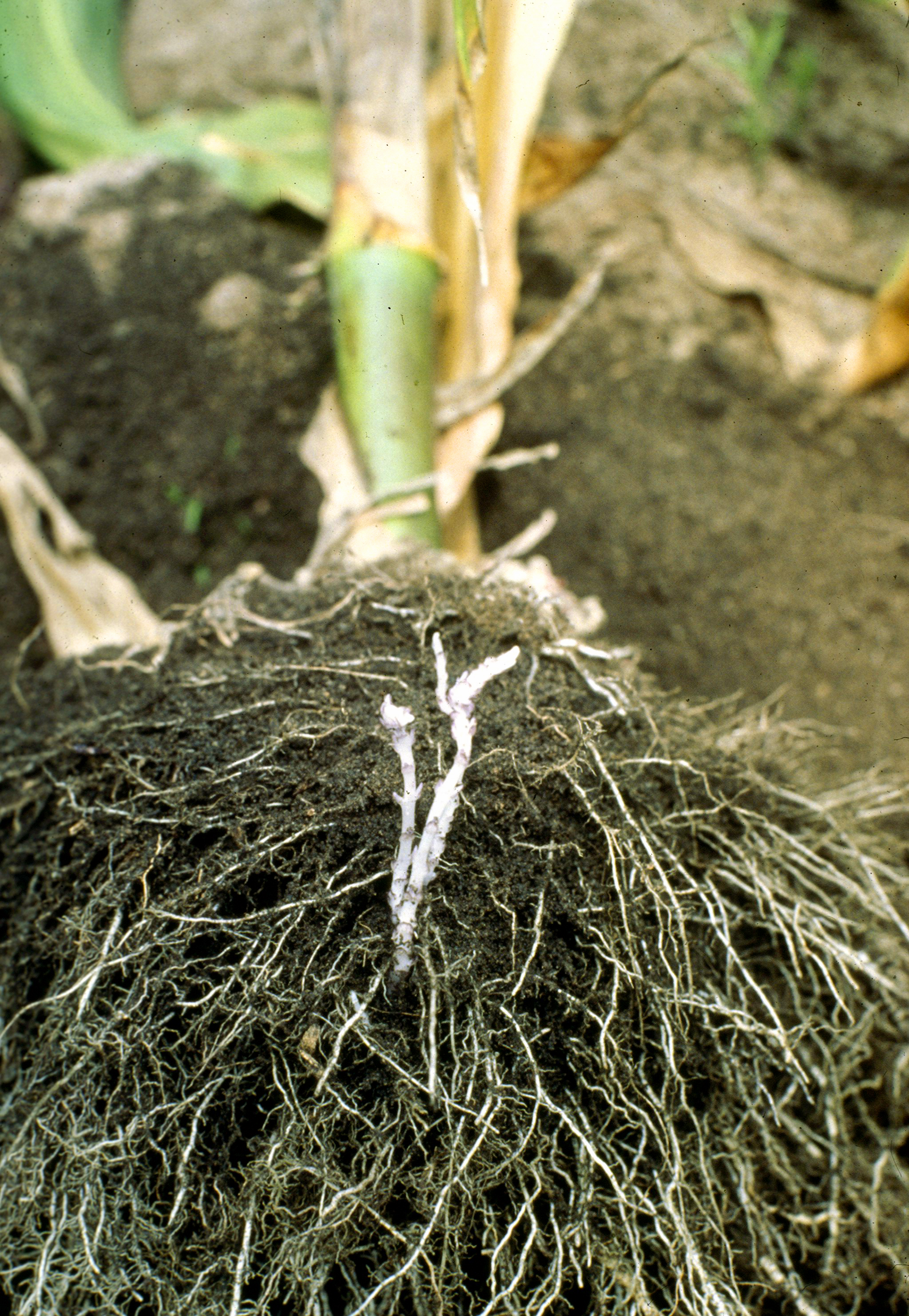
Striga witchweeds (white, center, attached to roots of the host) are economically important pests of the crop plants that they parasitize.

Parasitic behavior evolved in angiosperms roughly 12-13 times independently, a classic example of convergent evolution. Roughly 1% of all angiosperm species are parasitic, with a large degree of host dependence. The taxonomic family Orobanchaceae (encompassing the genera Triphysaria, Striga, and Orobanche) is the only family that contains both holoparasitic and hemiparasitic species, making it a model group for studying the evolutionary rise of parasitism. The remaining groups contain only hemiparasites or holoparasites.

The evolutionary event which gave rise to parasitism in plants was the development of haustoria. The first, most ancestral, haustoria are thought to be similar to that of the facultative hemiparasites within Triphysaria, lateral haustoria develop along the surface of the roots in these species. Later evolution led to the development of terminal or primary haustoria at the tip of the juvenile radicle, seen in obligate hemiparasitic species within Striga. Lastly, holoparasitic plants, always forms of obligate parasites, evolved over the loss of photosynthesis, seen in the genus Orobanche. The most specialized forms of holoparasitic plants are the four families Rafflesiaceae, Cytinaceae, Mitrastemonaceae and Apodanthaceae, lineages which independently have evolved further into endoparasites that, except for the flowers, spend their entire life cycle within the tissue of their host.

To maximize resources, many parasitic plants have evolved 'self-incompatibility', to avoid parasitizing themselves. Others such as Triphysaria usually avoid parasitizing other members of their species, but some parasitic plants have no such limits. The albino redwood is a mutant Sequoia sempervirens that produces no chlorophyll; they live on sugars from neighbouring trees, usually the parent tree from which they have grown (via a somatic mutation).

== Seed germination ==
Parasitic plants germinate in several methods. These can either be chemical or mechanical and the means used by seeds often depends on whether or not the parasites are root parasites or stem parasites. Most parasitic plants need to germinate near their host plants because their seeds are limited in the number of resources necessary to survive without nutrients from their host plants. Resources are limited due in part to the fact that most parasitic plants are not able to use autotrophic nutrition to establish the early stages of seeding.

Root parasitic plant seeds tend to use chemical cues for germination. For germination to occur, seeds need to be quite close to the host plant. For example, the seeds of witchweed (Striga asiatica) need to be within 3 to 4 millimeters (mm) of its host to receive chemical signals in the soil to trigger germination. This range is important because Striga asiatica will only grow about 4 mm after germination. Chemical compound cues sensed by parasitic plant seeds are from host plant root exudates that are leached nearby from the host's root system into the surrounding soil. These chemical cues are a variety of compounds that are unstable and rapidly degraded in soil and are present within a radius of a few meters of the plant exuding them. Parasitic plants germinate and follow a concentration gradient of these compounds in the soil toward the host plants if close enough. These compounds are called strigolactones. Strigolactone stimulates ethylene biosynthesis in seeds causing them to germinate.

There are a variety of chemical germination stimulants. Strigol was the first of the germination stimulants to be isolated. It was isolated from a non-host cotton plant and has been found in true host plants such as corn and millets. The stimulants are usually plant-specific, examples of other germination stimulants include sorgolactone from sorghum, Orobanche and electoral from red clover, and 5-deoxystrigol from Lotus japonicus. Strigolactones are apocarotenoids that are produced via the carotenoid pathway of plants. Strigolactones and mycorrhizal fungi have a relationship in which Strigolactone also cues the growth of mycorrhizal fungus.

Stem parasitic plants, unlike most root parasites, germinate using the resources inside their endosperms and can survive for some time. For example, the dodders (Cuscuta spp.) drop their seeds to the ground. These may remain dormant for up to five years before they find a host plant. Using the resources in the seed endosperm, the dodder can germinate. Once germinated, the plant has six days to find and establish a connection with its host plant before its resources are exhausted. Dodder seeds germinate above ground, then the plant sends out stems in search of its host plant reaching up to 6 cm before it dies. It is believed that the plant uses two methods of finding a host. The stem detects its host plant's scent and orients itself in that direction. Scientists used volatiles from tomato plants (α-pinene, β-myrcene, and β-phellandrene) to test the reaction of C. pentagona and found that the stem orients itself in the direction of the odor. Some studies suggest that by using light reflecting from nearby plants dodders can select hosts with higher sugar because of the levels of chlorophyll in the leaves. Once the dodder finds its host, it wraps itself around the host plant's stem. Using adventitious roots, the dodder taps into the host plant's stem with a haustorium, an absorptive organ within the host plant vascular tissue. Dodder makes several of these connections with the host as it moves up the plant.

=== Seed dispersal ===
There are several methods of seed dispersal, but all the strategies aim to put the seed in direct contact with, or within a critical distance of, the host.

1. The Cuscuta seedling can live for 3–7 days and extend out 35 cm in search of the host before it dies. This is because the Cuscuta seed is large and has stored nutrients to sustain its life. This is also useful for seeds that get digested by animals and are excreted.
2. Mistletoe use a sticky seed for dispersal. The seed sticks to nearby animals and birds and then comes into direct contact with the host.
3. Arceuthobium seeds have a similarly sticky seed as the mistletoe but they do not rely on animals and birds, they mainly disperse by fruit explosiveness. Once the seed makes contact with the host, rainwater can help position the seed in a suitable position.
4. Some seeds detect and respond to chemical stimulations produced in the host's roots and start to grow towards the host.

== Obstacles to host attachment ==
A parasitic plant has many obstacles to overcome to attach to a host. Distance from the host and stored nutrients are some of the problems, and the host's defenses are an obstacle to overcome. The first hurdle is penetrating the host since the host has systems to reinforce the cell wall by protein cross-linking so that it stops the parasitic progress at the cortex of the host's roots. The second hurdle is the host's ability to secrete germination inhibitors. This prevents germination of the parasitic seed. The third hurdle is the host's ability to create a toxic environment at the location where the parasitic plant attaches. The host secretes phenolic compounds into the apoplast. This creates a toxic environment for the parasitic plant, eventually killing it. The fourth hurdle is the host's ability to ruin the tubercle using gums and gels or injecting toxins into the tubercle.

== Host range ==
Some parasitic plants are generalists and parasitize many different species, even several different species at once. Dodder (Cuscuta spp.) and red rattle (Odontites vernus) are generalist parasites. Other parasitic plants are specialists that parasitize a few or just one species. Beech drops (Epifagus virginiana) is a root holoparasite only on American beech (Fagus grandifolia). Rafflesia is a holoparasite on the vine Tetrastigma. Plants such as Pterospora become parasites of mycorrhizal fungi. There is evidence that parasites also practice self-discrimination, species of Triphysaria experience reduced haustorium development in the presence of other Triphysaria. The mechanism for self-discrimination in parasites is not yet known.

== Aquatic parasitic plants ==
Parasitism also evolved within aquatic species of plants and algae. Parasitic marine plants are described as benthic, meaning that they are sedentary or attached to another structure. Plants and algae that grow on the host plant, using it as an attachment point, are given the designation epiphytic (epilithic is the name given to plants/algae that use rocks or boulders for attachment). While not necessarily parasitic, some species occur in high correlation with a certain host species, suggesting that they rely on the host plant in some way or another. In contrast, endophytic plants and algae grow inside their host plant; these have a wide range of host dependence from obligate holoparasites to facultative hemiparasites.

Marine parasites occur as a higher proportion of marine flora in temperate rather than tropical waters. While no full explanation for this is available, many of the potential host plants such as kelp and other macroscopic brown algae are generally restricted to temperate areas. Roughly 75% of parasitic red algae infect hosts in the same taxonomic family as themselves, and these are given the designation adelphoparasites. Other marine parasites, deemed endozoic, are parasites of marine invertebrates (mollusks, flatworms, sponges) and can be either holoparasitic or hemiparasitic, some retaining the ability to photosynthesize after infection. These are the only marine parasitic plants that parasitize animal hosts.

However, in freshwater the algae Cladogonium ogishimae is the only known true holoparasite on an animal host, parasitizing a variety of shrimp species and became a known pest in the freshwater shrimp aquarium hobby. Its mobile zoospores retain chlorophyll and are visible under the animals' abdomen in severe infections, while filaments grow into the muscle.

== Importance ==
Species within Orobanchaceae are some of the most economically destructive species on Earth. Species of Striga alone are estimated to cost billions of dollars a year in crop yield loss annually, infesting over 50 million hectares of cultivated land within sub-Saharan Africa alone. Striga can infest both grasses and grains, including corn, rice and sorghum, some of the most important food crops. Orobanche also threatens a wide range of important crops, including peas, chickpeas, tomatoes, carrots, lettuce, and varieties of the genus Brassica (e.g. cabbage and broccoli). Yield loss from Orobanche can reach 100% and has caused farmers in some regions of the world to abandon certain staple crops and begin importing others as an alternative. Much research has been devoted to the control of Orobanche and Striga species, which are even more devastating in developing areas of the world, though no method has been found to be entirely successful.

- Mistletoes cause economic damage to forests and ornamental trees.
- Rafflesia arnoldii produces the world's largest flowers at about one meter in diameter. It is a tourist attraction in its native habitat.
- Sandalwood trees (Santalum species) have many important cultural uses and their fragrant oils have high commercial value.
- Indian paintbrush (Castilleja linariaefolia) is the state flower of Wyoming.
- The oak mistletoe (Phoradendron serotinum) is the floral emblem of Oklahoma.
- A few other parasitic plants are occasionally cultivated for their attractive flowers, such as Nuytsia and broomrape.
- Parasitic plants are important in research, especially on the loss of photosynthesis and the co-dependency of functional, genetic and lifestyle changes.
- A few dozen parasitic plants have occasionally been used as food by people.
- Western Australian Christmas tree (Nuytsia floribunda) sometimes damages underground cables. It mistakes the cables for host roots and tries to parasitize them using its sclerenchymatic guillotine.

Some parasitic plants are destructive while some have positive influences in their communities. Some parasitic plants damage invasive species more than native species. This results in the reduced damage of invasive species in the community. Parasitic plants are major shapers of their community, affecting not just the host species but indirectly affecting others. Competition amongst host species will change due to the parasitic plant. Plant parasitism have been shown to keep invasive species under control and become keystone species in an ecosystem.

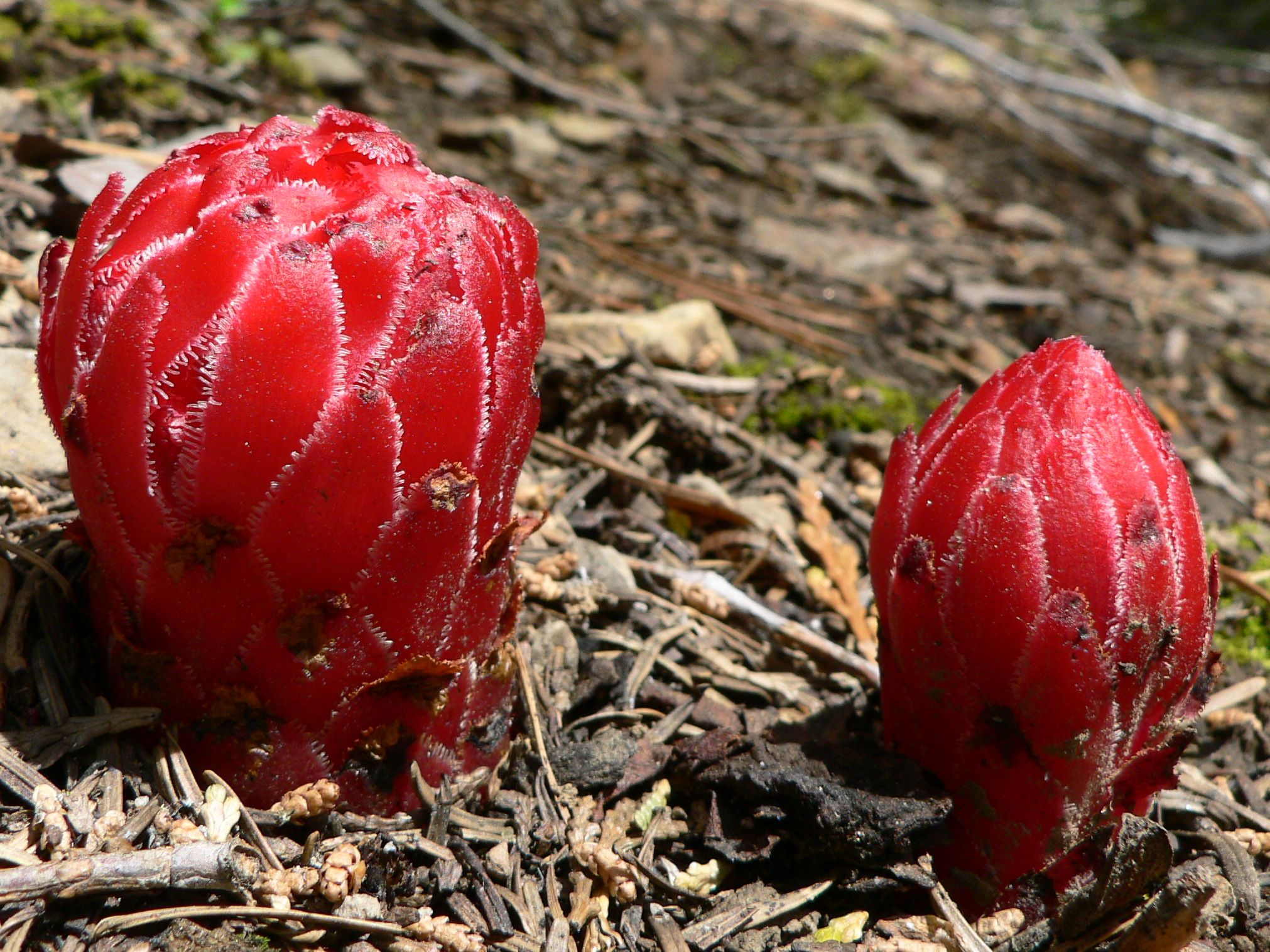
Newly emergent snow plant (Sarcodes sanguinea), a flowering plant parasitic on mycorrhizal fungi

In many regions, including the Nepal Eastern Himalayas, parasitic plants are used for medicinal and ritual purposes.

== Plants parasitic on fungi ==
About 400 species of flowering plants, plus one gymnosperm (Parasitaxus usta) and one bryophyte (the liverwort Aneura mirabilis), are parasitic on mycorrhizal fungi. This effectively gives these plants the ability to become associated with many of the other plants around them. They are termed myco-heterotrophs. Some myco-heterotrophs are ghost pipe (Monotropa uniflora), snow plant (Sarcodes sanguinea), underground orchid (Rhizanthella gardneri), bird's nest orchid (Neottia nidus-avis), and sugarstick (Allotropa virgata). Within the taxonomic family Ericaceae, known for extensive mycorrhizal relationships, there are the Monotropoids. The Monotropoids include the genera Monotropa, Monotropsis, and Pterospora among others. Myco-heterotrophic behavior is commonly accompanied by the loss of chlorophyll.

== See also ==
- Living stump
