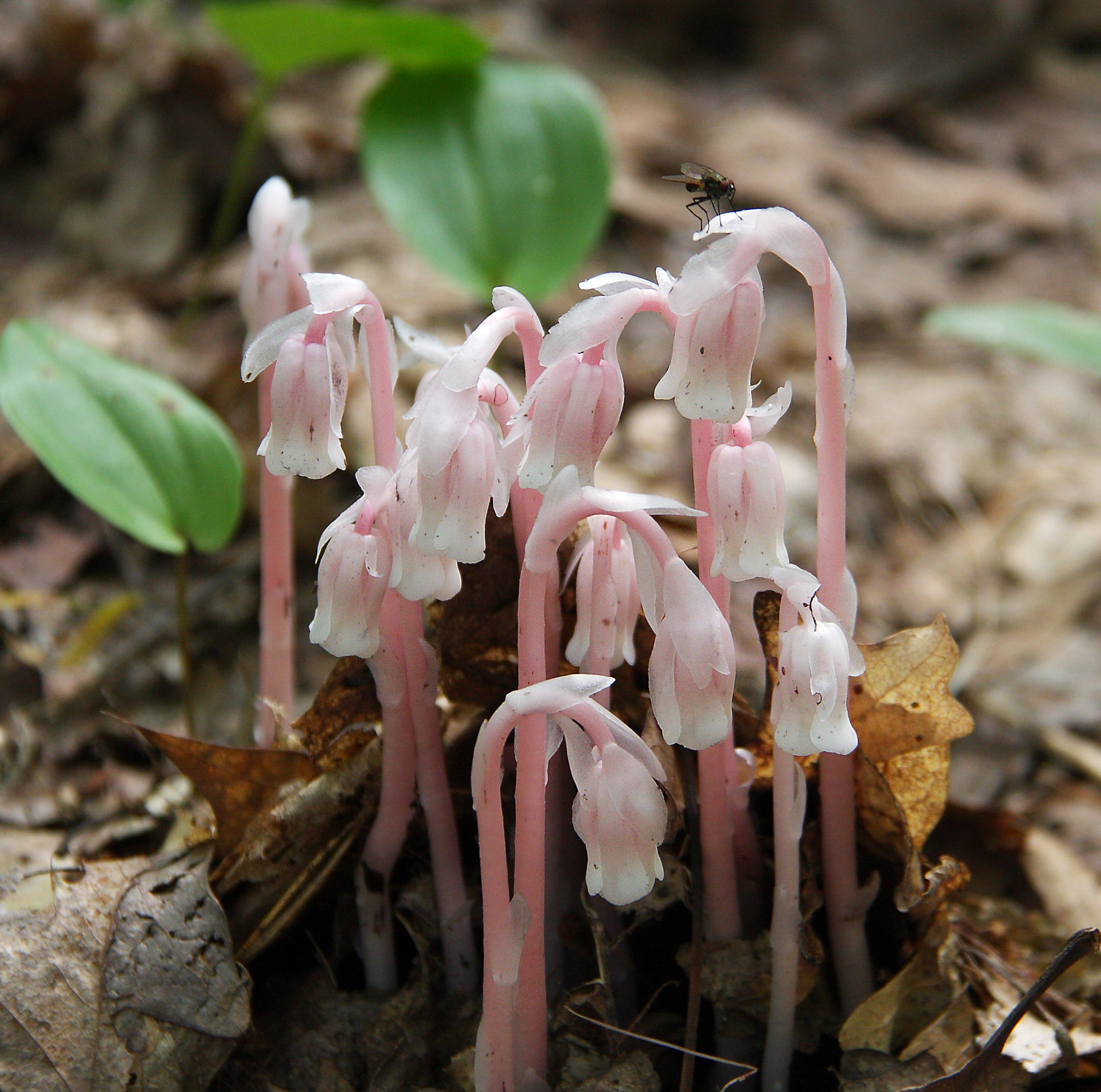
- Monotropa uniflora

Scientific classification
- Kingdom: Plantae
- Clade: Tracheophytes
- Clade: Angiosperms
- Clade: Eudicots
- Clade: Asterids
- Order: Ericales
- Family: Ericaceae
- Subfamily: Monotropoideae; Arn. (1832)

Tribes
- Monotropeae; Pterosporeae; Pyroleae (not included in some classifications)

= Monotropoideae =

Subfamily of flowering plants in the heather family

Monotropoideae, sometimes referred to as monotropes, are a flowering plant subfamily in the family Ericaceae. Members of this subfamily are notable for their mycoheterotrophic and non-photosynthesizing or achlorophyllous characteristics.

== Description ==
The overall morphology of these plants is highly reduced compared to other members of the Ericaceae, which are practically all subshrubs, shrubs, or trees. By contrast, the Monotropoideae are all herbaceous perennials, in which an annual shoot reemerges seasonally (in spring or early summer, depending on climate) from a perennial root. The shoot can be characterized as a single inflorescence or cluster of inflorescences, and is generally a raceme with one to many flowers per axis, though occasionally the raceme may be so reduced as to appear similar to a spike, and in Monotropa, the inflorescence can take the form of a solitary flower. Notably, the shoots are achlorophyllous, in keeping with the mycoheterotrophic and non-photosynthetic nature of the plant, and the plants have a striking and distinctive appearance, with coloration ranging from pure white to pastel tones to very bright yellow or red. (If the Pyroleae are included, many of these species are partially photosythentic, and have green vegetative tissue, though leaves are usually reduced to a basal rosette.)

The emerging shoots may be erect or nodding, with erect or pendulous flowers, which may become more erect as the plant matures. The flowers themselves, in common with other members of the Ericaceae, have corollas that are generally bell- or cup-shaped, though the petals themselves may or may not be fused. However, the Monotropoideae lack the poricidal anthers that are characteristic of the majority of the Ericaceae. (The Pyroleae do have poricidal anthers, however.) Pollen grains are released as a monad, in contrast to the majority of the Ericaceae, which release pollen grains in tetrad groups. (The Pyroleae variously release pollen as monads, tetrads, or polyads.) Fruits are dry loculicidal dehiscent (or sometimes indehiscent) capsule or a berry. Seeds are highly reduced dust seeds. The shoot may or may not be persistent after seed dispersal.

== Taxonomy ==
The monotropes were first described as a distinct plant family by Thomas Nuttall in 1818, when he united the Linnean genus Monotropa with his newly authored genus and species Pterospora andromedea as the family Monotropeae (changed by later authors to Monotropaceae when modern rules of naming plant taxa were developed). David Don was the first to recognize this group as a tribe within the Ericaceae, later raised to subfamily status as the Monotropoideae by Asa Gray in 1878. (However, George Arnott Walker-Arnott was the first to validly publish that name, as a subfamily of Monotropaceae, in 1832, hence, Arnott is cited as author of the name.)

Other classifications have included Monotropoideae as a subfamily of Hypopityaceae, by August W. Eichler (1875), and as a subfamily of Pyrolaceae by Carl Georg Oscar Drude (1889); both classifications united the monotropes with the pyrolids in a single group. Over the next century, authors have variously treated this group as a distinct family or as a subfamily of the Ericaceae, though the trend from Margaret W. Henderson (1919) onward was toward the latter subfamily classification, albeit, the influential Cronquist and Dahlgren systems continued to treat the group as the family Monotropaceae, separate from the Ericaceae.

Contemporary molecular phylogenetics has clearly established the Monotropoideae as a group within the larger Ericaceae, though many of the details of relationships between the Monotropoideae and the rest of the Ericaceae are still (as of 2015) a topic of active research, particularly the question of whether or not the Pyroleae and the rest of the Monotropeae form a single monophyletic group.

== Mycoheterotrophic characteristics ==
The species in this subfamily are all mycoheterotrophic, relying on fungal hosts for their carbon nutrition. The fungi parasitized by these plants are ectomycorrhizal species of fungi, that are part of the Russulaceae . Hence, these plants act as direct parasites of these fungi, and also indirectly, act as an epiparasite of conifers and the larger shared mycorrhizal network. Monotropoideae species can generally be described as full, obligate mycoheterotrophs, though if the Pyroleae are treated as part of the Monotropoideae, include partially mycoheterotrophic (mixtotrophic) members as well. The parasitism by these plants is generally very specific in terms of its fungal hosts, ranging from single families of fungi, to a few closely related species.

The morphology of the root and the root-level fungal symbiont is distinctive and referred to as monotropoid mycorrhiza. (Although mycorrhizas are generally considered to be mutualistic relationships, it is generally recognized that mutualism and parasitism exist on a continuum, and that plant-fungus symbioses with a clearly mycorrhizal root anatomy can include exploitative relationships.)

== Pollination ==
The Monotropoideae are adapted for pollination by bumble bees (Bombus), including specialized buzz pollination in a few genera. In some genera (such as Monotropa), some degree of self-pollination has been observed in addition to bumble bee pollination. Hummingbirds have also been observed visiting Sarcodes, though it is also primarily bumble bee-pollinated. Several floral scent compounds of Monotropastrum humile, linalool, α-terpineol, and geraniol, have been demonstrated to be bumble bee attractants.

== Habitat and distribution ==
Monotropoids occur in coniferous or mixed coniferous forests, often in areas with a heavy, closed overstory with low light availability. They occur in boggy areas, in deep humusy soils, and even relatively dry slopes. The soil pH in locations in which they occur is acidic to varying degrees.

Distribution is through much of the temperate Northern Hemisphere, though ranging into the subarctic and montane tropical regions as well. Distribution is limited by available moisture (Monotropoideae species have limited ability to survive long enough to set seed during seasonal dry periods), and by the distribution of conifer genera that are hosts of the specific host fungi these plants parasitize.

The distribution of Monotropa is responsible for the majority of the range of this subfamily, with other genera not having the same global distribution. The center of biodiversity for this subfamily is found in temperate western North America, along the northern and central California and Pacific Northwest coast and montane areas as far east as the Sierra Nevada-Cascade cordillera. Seven of the ten genera usually recognized as members of this subfamily (excluding Pyroleae) occur there, with six of these occurring only in that region.

== Genera ==
=== Tribe Monotropeae ===
- Allotropa
- Cheilotheca
- Hemitomes
- Hypopitys (treated by many authors as a synonym of Monotropa)
- Monotropa
- Monotropastrum
- Monotropsis
- Pityopus
- Pleuricospora

=== Tribe Pterosporeae ===
- Pterospora
- Sarcodes

=== Tribe Pyroleae ===
- Chimaphila
- Moneses
- Orthilia
- Pyrola
