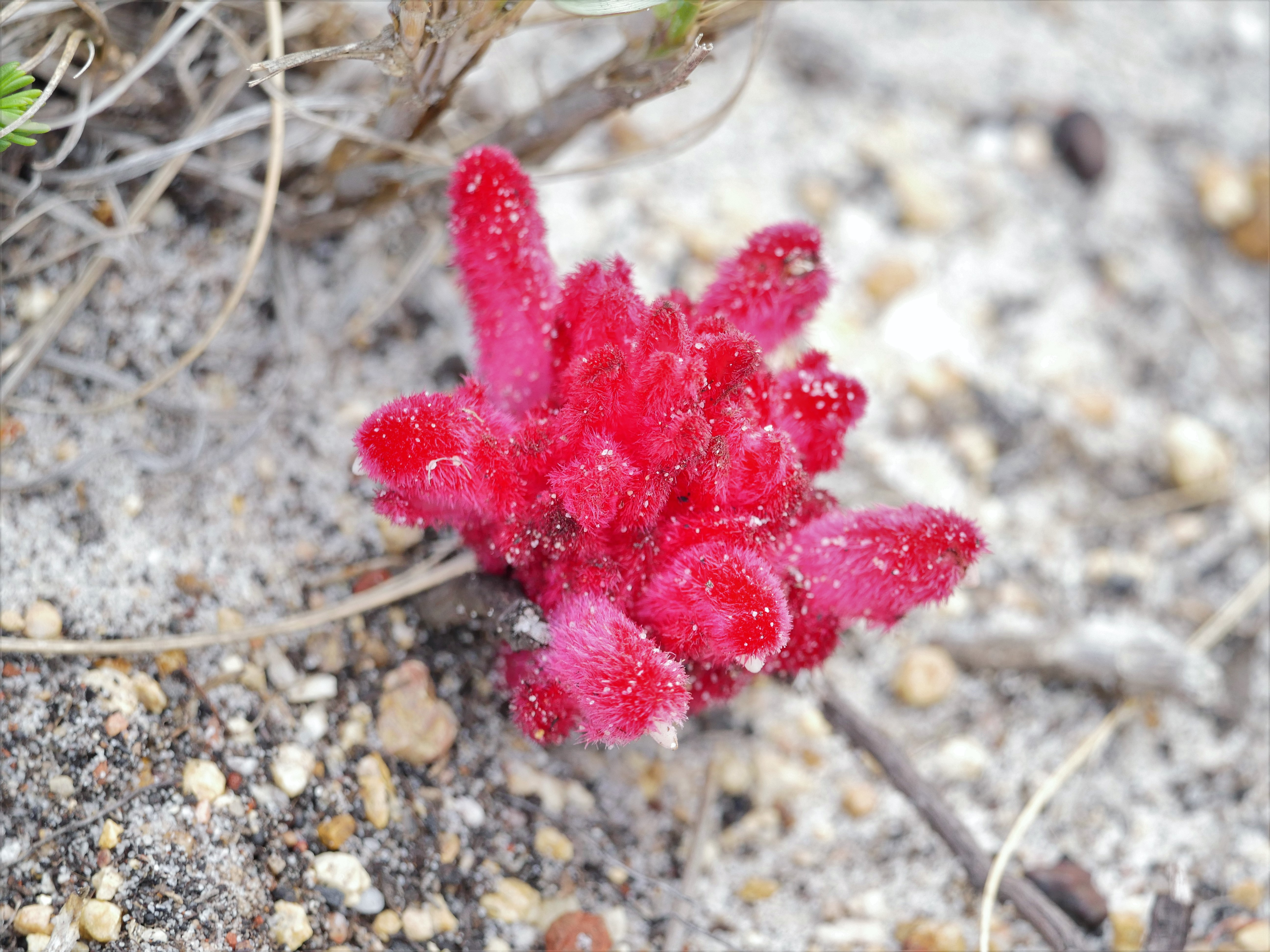
- Hyobanche sanguinea

Scientific classification
- Kingdom: Plantae
- Clade: Tracheophytes
- Clade: Angiosperms
- Clade: Eudicots
- Clade: Asterids
- Order: Lamiales
- Family: Orobanchaceae
- Tribe: Buchnereae
- Genus: Hyobanche; L.

Species
- See text

Synonyms
- Haematobanche C.Presl

= Hyobanche =

Genus of plants in the broomrape family

Hyobanche are a genus of flowering plants in the broomrape family Orobanchaceae, native to southern Africa. They are root parasites that cannot perform photosynthesis, and are only observed above ground when flowering.

== Species ==
Currently accepted species include:

- Hyobanche atropurpurea Bolus
- Hyobanche fulleri E.Phillips
- Hyobanche hanekomii A.Wolfe
- Hyobanche robusta Schönland
- Hyobanche rubra N.E.Br.
- Hyobanche sanguinea L.
- Hyobanche thinophila A.Wolfe
