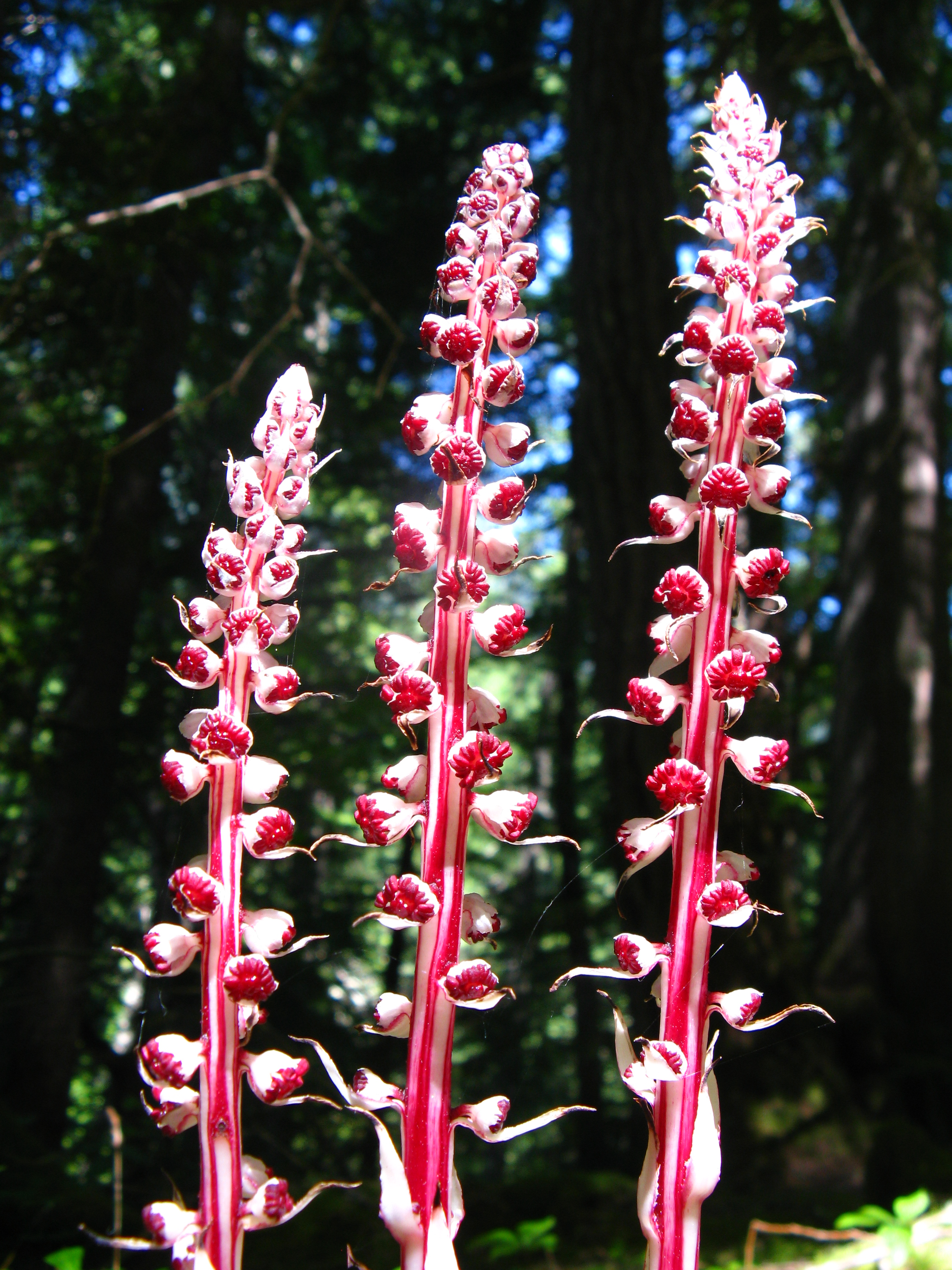

Scientific classification
- Kingdom: Plantae
- Clade: Embryophytes
- Clade: Tracheophytes
- Clade: Angiosperms
- Clade: Eudicots
- Clade: Asterids
- Order: Ericales
- Family: Ericaceae
- Subfamily: Monotropoideae
- Tribe: Monotropeae
- Genus: Allotropa; Torr. & Gray
- Species: A. virgata

Binomial name
- Allotropa virgata Torr. & Gray

= Allotropa =

Genus of flowering plants in the heath family

Allotropa virgata is in the family Ericaceae and is the only species of the genus Allotropa. It is a perennial plant that gets its common names from the distinct white and red or maroon stripes along its erect peduncle. It is a non-green plant, as it lacks chlorophyll, instead obtaining nutrition from neighboring green plants through a fungal intermediate.

Its common names include sugarstick, candystriped allotropa and barber's pole.

== Range ==
Allotropa virgata was first collected by the Wilkes Expedition in the Cascade Mountains of Washington in the late 1800s. It is found in the oak, coniferous and hardwood forests of the Pacific Northwest. It grows from 75 to 3,000 meters (250 to 9,800 ft) in elevation in the High Sierra Nevada, High Cascade Range and up through British Columbia. There is also suitable habitat in Idaho, Nevada, and Montana.

== Ecology ==
Allotropa virgata feeds primarily on Western matsutake mushroom (Tricholoma murrillianum) mycelium and possibly that of the related Tricholoma magnivelare. Allotropa virgata was listed as a 'sensitive' species in 1998. It is a clonal species that spreads through its extensive lateral root system. Because it spreads underground through buds on the lateral roots, it is able to survive ground fires if the host tree of its fungal hosts are not killed as well.

Allotropa virgata is pollinated by bumblebees, sweat bees, and some Lepidoptera species.

== Description ==
Allotropa virgata has an underground stem (rhizome) with brittle roots. The scale-like leaves are along the striped peduncle with a raceme-like inflorescence. The peduncle is persistent after the seeds have been dispersed and tends to turn brown. The bracts of the inflorescence are less than 3 cm and the pedicels are not recurved. The stems stand 15–50 centimeters (5.9–19.7 in) tall. Standing dead stems, which darken to a reddish-brown with no white, from prior years' growth are often present.

The individual flowers generally do not have sepals but if they do, have 2 to 4. Often the petals of the flower are incorrectly considered sepals. The corolla has 5 white petals in a cup shape, all petals are free and concave. From the corolla there are 10 protruding stamens, maroon in color, with dehiscent anthers. The superior ovary has 5 chambers with a style under 2 mm and a disk-like stigma. The short nectary is disk-like as well with 10 lobes.

The fruit of A. virgata is a capsule which dehisces lengthwise through the ovary wall near the center of each of the 5 chambers. This dehiscence allows the many fusiform seeds from each chamber to be dispersed.

== Etymology ==
Allotropa is derived from Greek and means 'different nourishment' (allo– 'different', 'other'; tropus– 'nourishment').
