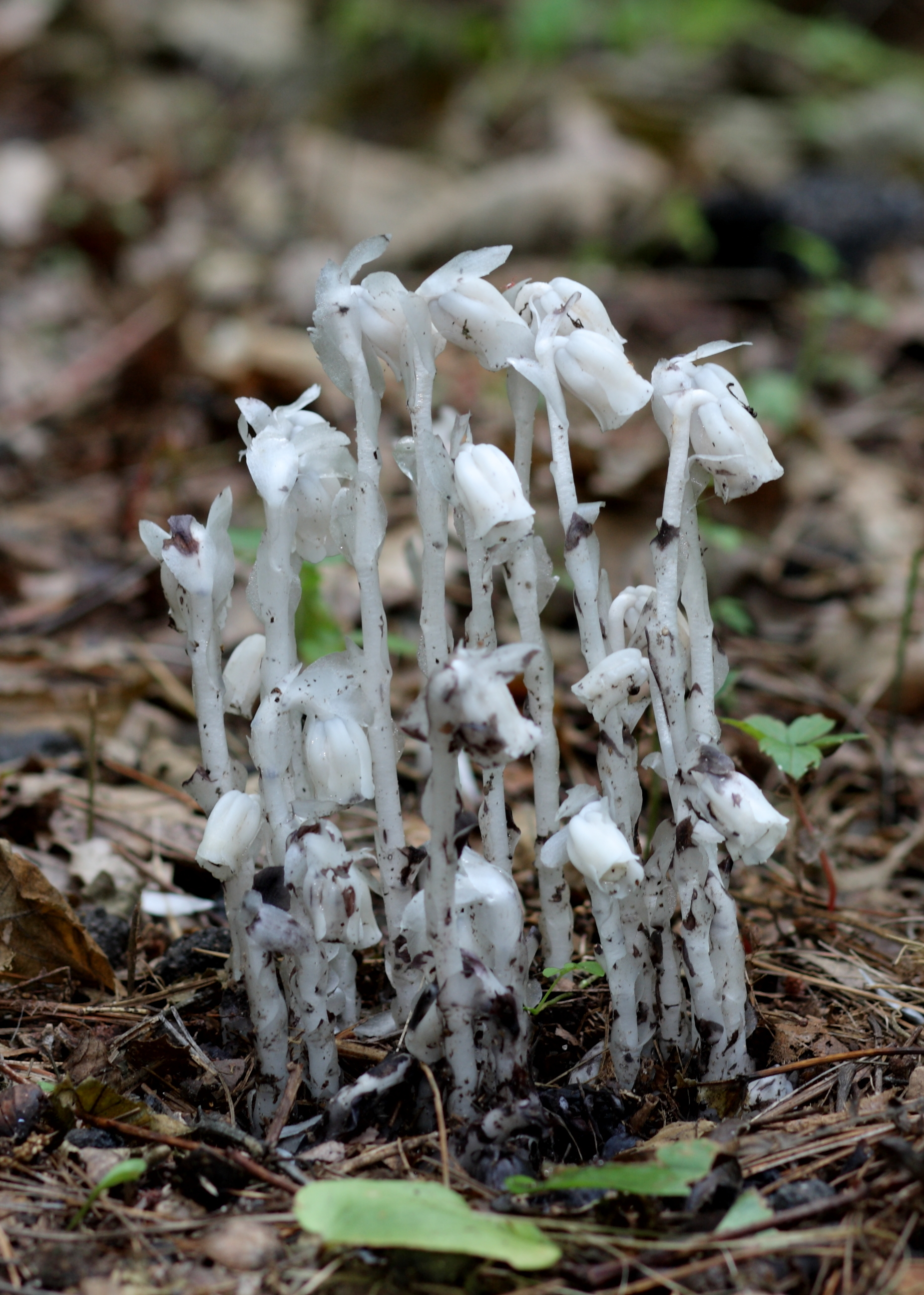
- Growing in the Penwood State Park in Connecticut

Conservation status
- Secure (NatureServe)

Scientific classification
- Kingdom: Plantae
- Clade: Tracheophytes
- Clade: Angiosperms
- Clade: Eudicots
- Clade: Asterids
- Order: Ericales
- Family: Ericaceae
- Genus: Monotropa
- Species: M. uniflora

Binomial name
- Monotropa uniflora L.

= Monotropa uniflora =

Species of flowering plant in the heath family

Monotropa uniflora, also known as the American Indian ghost pipe plant (shortened to ghost plant, ghost pipe, American Indian pipe, or Indian pipe), is a herbaceous, parasitic, non-photosynthesizing, perennial flowering plant native to North America, Latin America, and East Asia but with large gaps between areas. The plant is waxy white, but some specimens have been described as having black flecks or pale pink coloration. Rare variants may have a deep red color. The name "Monotropa" is Greek for "one turn" and "uniflora" is Latin for "one flowered" as there is one sharply curved stem for each single flower. M. uniflora is commonly found growing in clumps of two or more, with its fungal source nearby.

== Description ==
The stems reach heights of 5–30 centimetres (2–12 in), sheathed with highly reduced leaves 5–10 millimetres (3/16–3/8 in) long, best identified as scales or bracts. These structures are small, thin, and translucent; they do not have petioles but instead extend in a sheath-like manner out of the stem.

As its scientific name suggests, and unlike the closely related Monotropa hypopitys (but like Monotropastrum humile), the stems bear a single flower 10–20 mm (3/8–13/16 in) long, with 3–8 translucent petals, 10–12 stamens and a single pistil. It flowers from early summer to early autumn, often a few days after rainfall. The fruit, an oval capsule-like structure, enlarges and becomes upright when the seeds mature. After maturity the stem and capsule appear desiccated, and dark brown or black with a brittle texture.

The seeds of M. uniflora are small, ranging between 0.6–0.8 mm (3/128–1/32 in) in length. Once the plant has been pollinated, the seeds are pushed through the petals in a tiny slit and dispersed via wind methods.

Unlike most plants, it is white and does not contain chlorophyll. Instead of generating food using the energy from sunlight, it is parasitic, and more specifically a mycoheterotroph. Its hosts are in the Russulaceae family. Most fungi are mycorrhizal, meaning that they grow symbiotically in association with tree roots. Through the fungal web of mycorrhizae, the M. uniflora roots ultimately sap food from where the host fungi are connected to the photosynthetic trees. The clustered node roots of this plant are covered in hairs called cystidium. The cystidia found on these roots allow easy attachment to fungi hyphae, such as can be seen in ectomycorrhiza. Since it is not dependent on sunlight to grow, it can grow in very dark environments like in the understory of dense forests. The complex relationship that allows this plant to grow makes propagation difficult.

=== Genetics ===
M. uniflora is found in three general distribution areas: North America, Latin America, and East Asia. DNA analysis has shown that these three populations are genetically distinct from one another. Furthermore, the North American and Latin American populations appear to be more closely related to each other than either is related to the Asian population.

The species has 48 chromosomes.

== Taxonomy ==
It was formerly classified in the family Monotropaceae, but is now included within the Ericaceae. This reclassification is based on molecular phylogenetic studies showing that the group is embedded within Ericaceae. It is of ephemeral occurrence, depending on the right conditions (moisture after a dry period) to appear full grown within a couple of days.

== Ecology ==
The flowers of M. uniflora are visited by various bee and fly species, most commonly bumblebees. Bumblebees are an important pollen dispersal agent for the plant, crawling into the flower for pollen.

Like most mycoheterotrophic plants, M. uniflora associates with a small range of fungal hosts, all of them members of Russulaceae.

It is often associated with beech trees.

== Toxicity ==
The plant contains glycosides and may be toxic to humans.

== Uses ==
In addition to various reported traditional medicine uses, the plant has been used as an analgesic and anxiolytic in herbal medicine since the late 19th century. This may be due to the plant containing salicylic acid and grayanotoxins.

Walter H. Prest described the plant as having an asparagus-like flavor once cooked.

=== Cultural references ===
M. uniflora has been featured in several pieces from renowned American poet Emily Dickinson.

The Cherokee of North America feature the "pipe plant" in some of their creation stories. The legend states that the plant was named "Indian pipe" due to a group of chiefs quarreling without resolution, while passing a pipe around during the dispute; the Great Spirit then turned the chiefs into the plant, as they should have smoked the sacred pipe after making peace with each other. The plant is said to grow wherever friends have quarreled.

The Nlaka'pamux use the presence of plentiful, blooming M. uniflora as a temporal indicator that Tricholoma mushrooms are abundant.

== Gallery ==
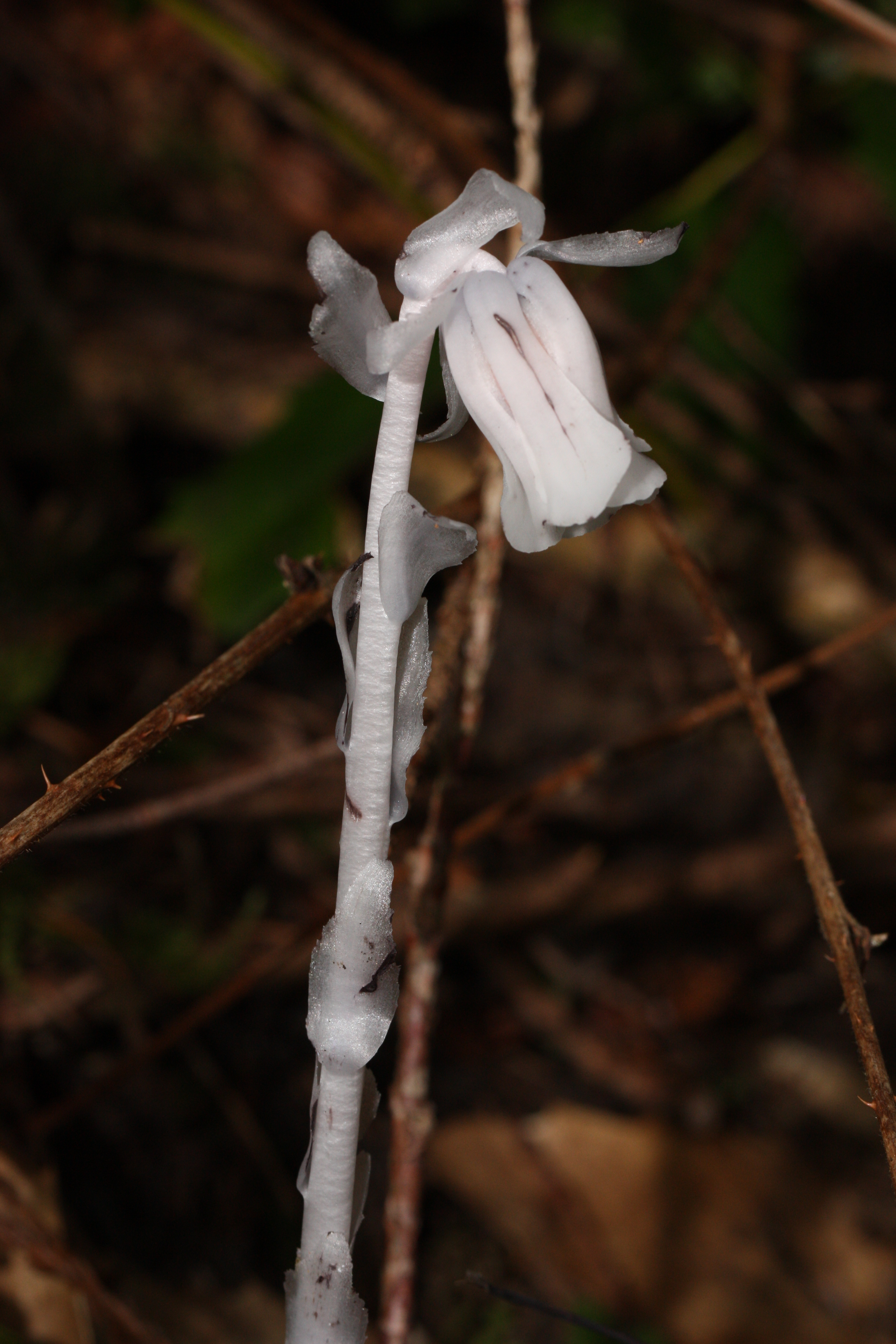
The alternate leaves

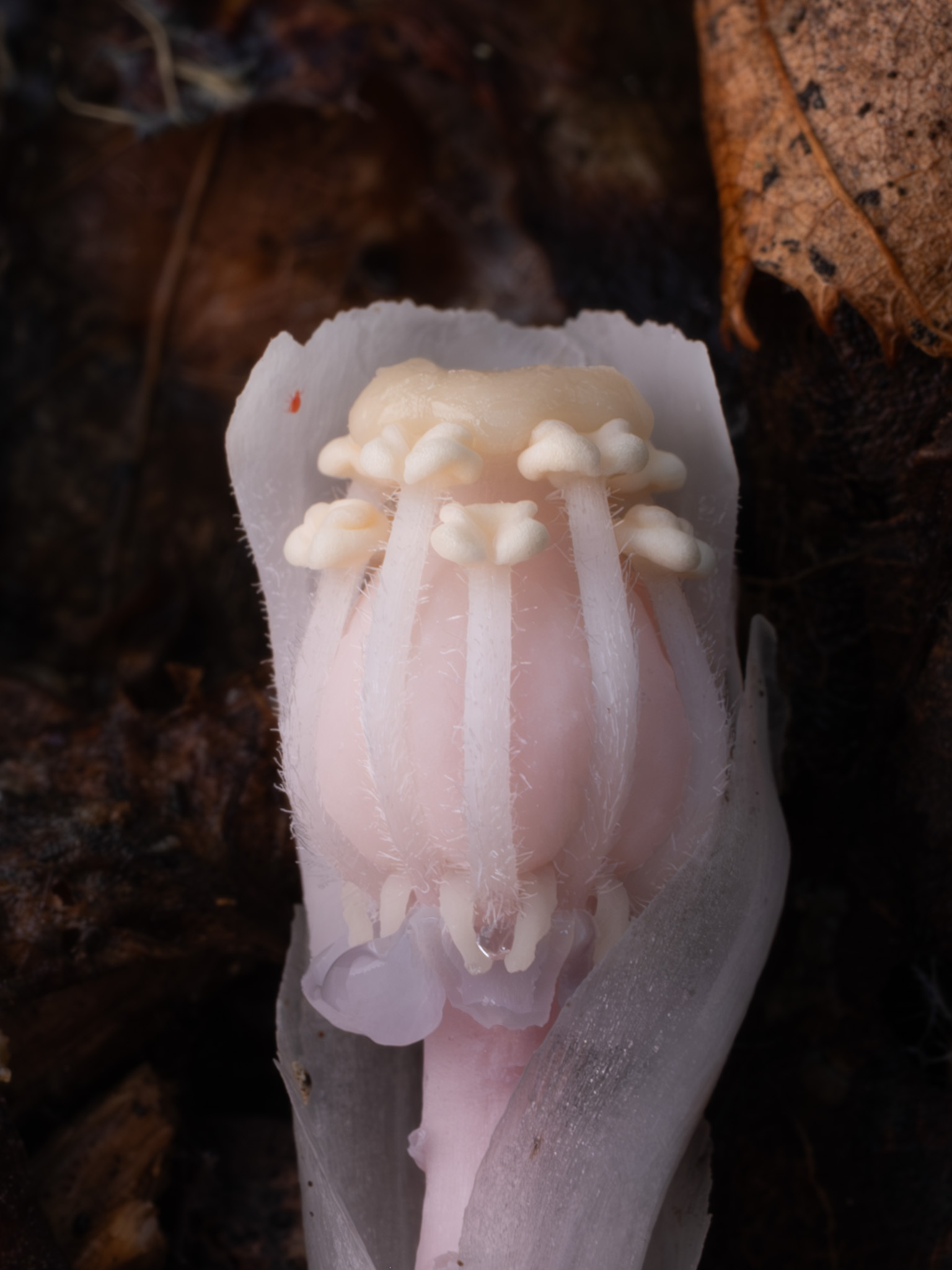
Dissected flower

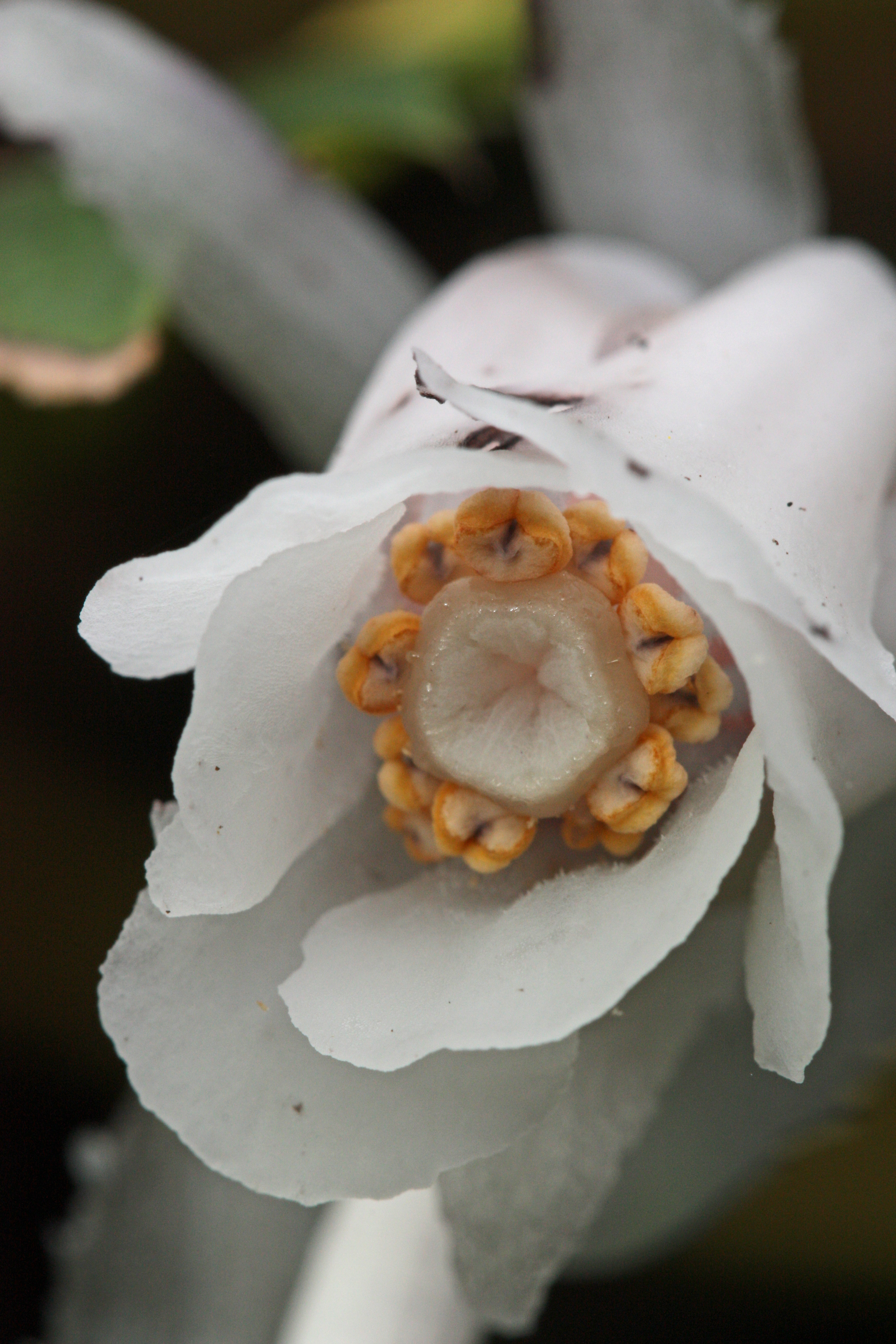
Each of ten anthers open via two curving slits.

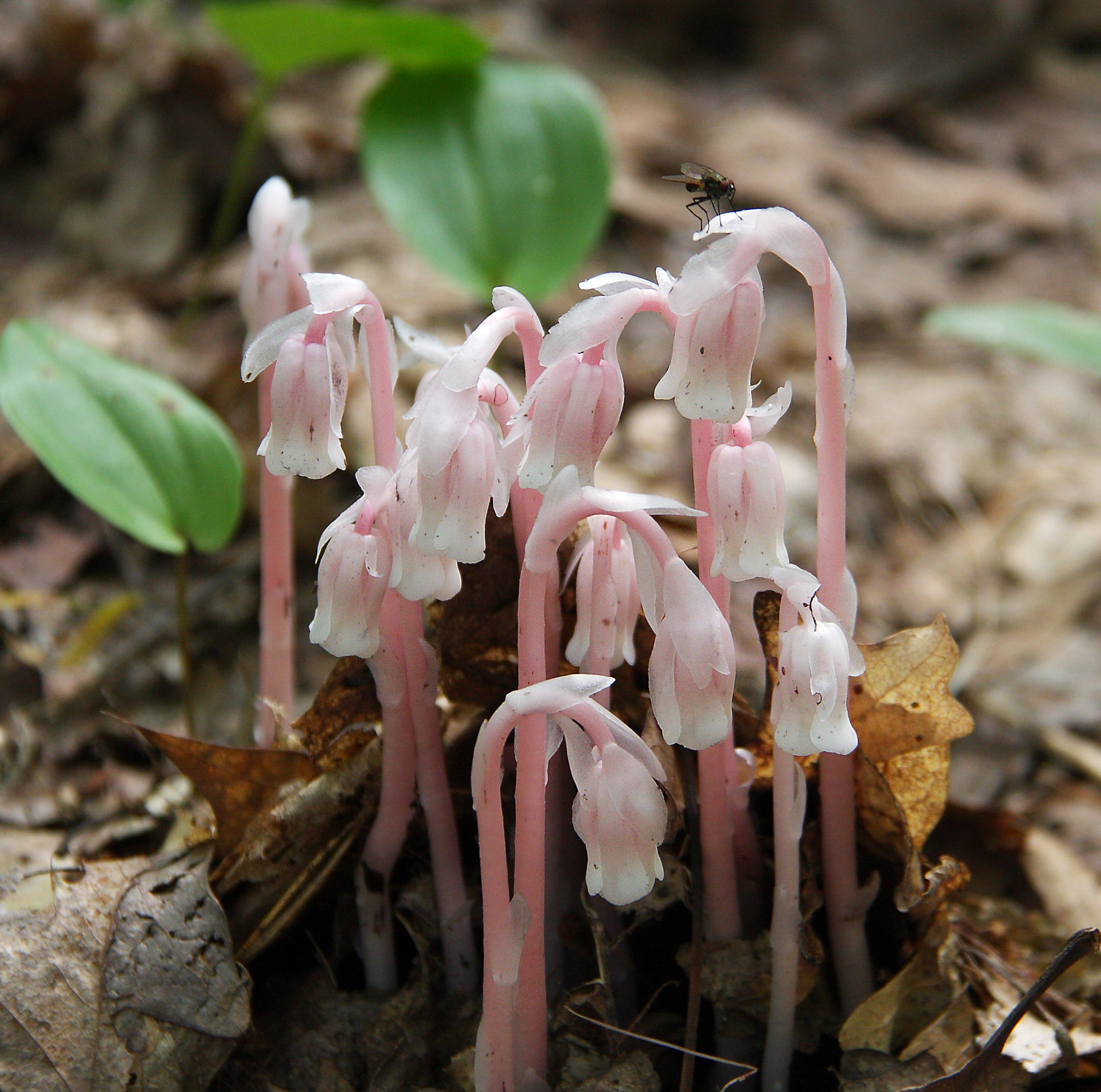
Stems with pink coloration

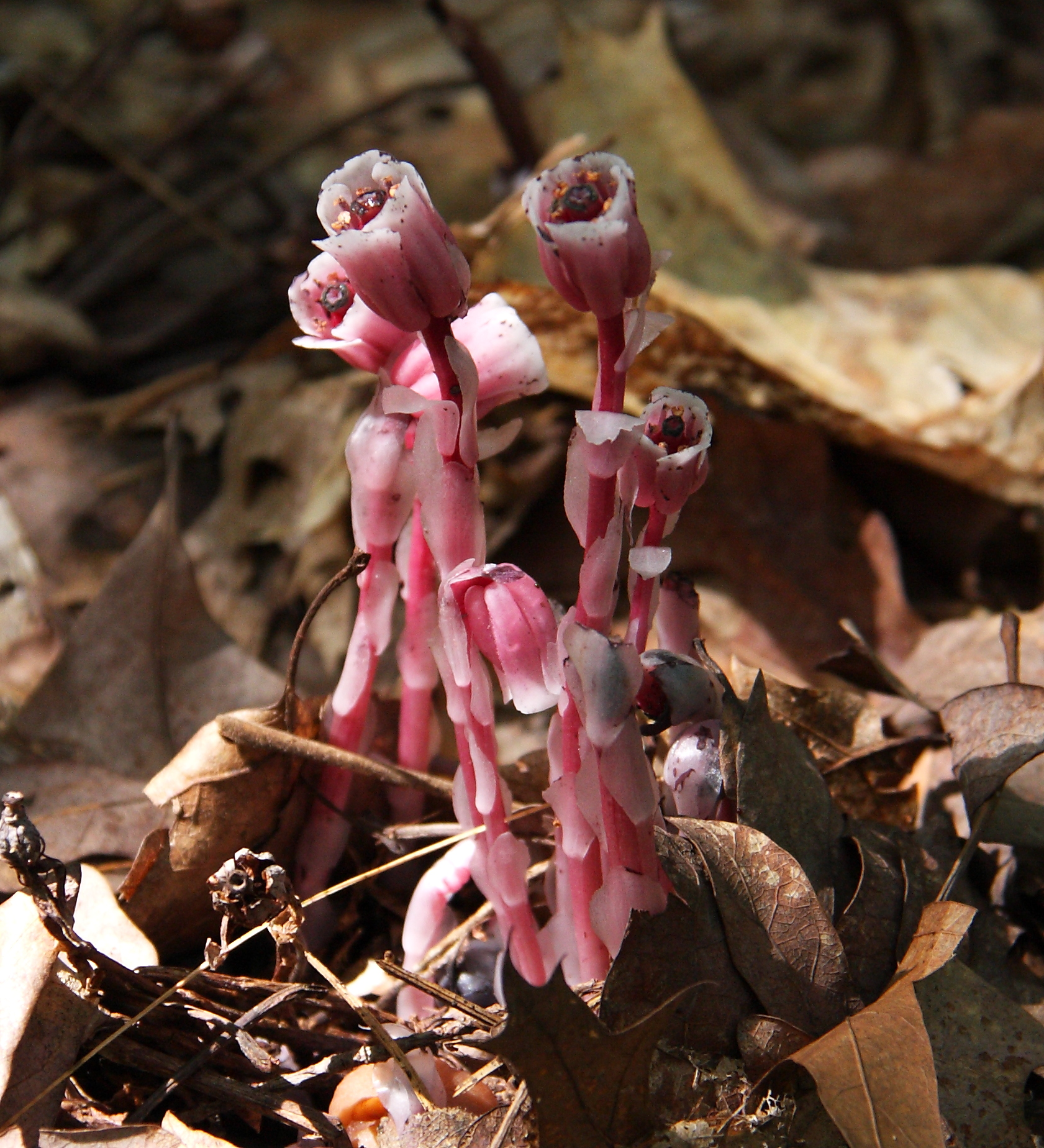
Less common reddish coloration

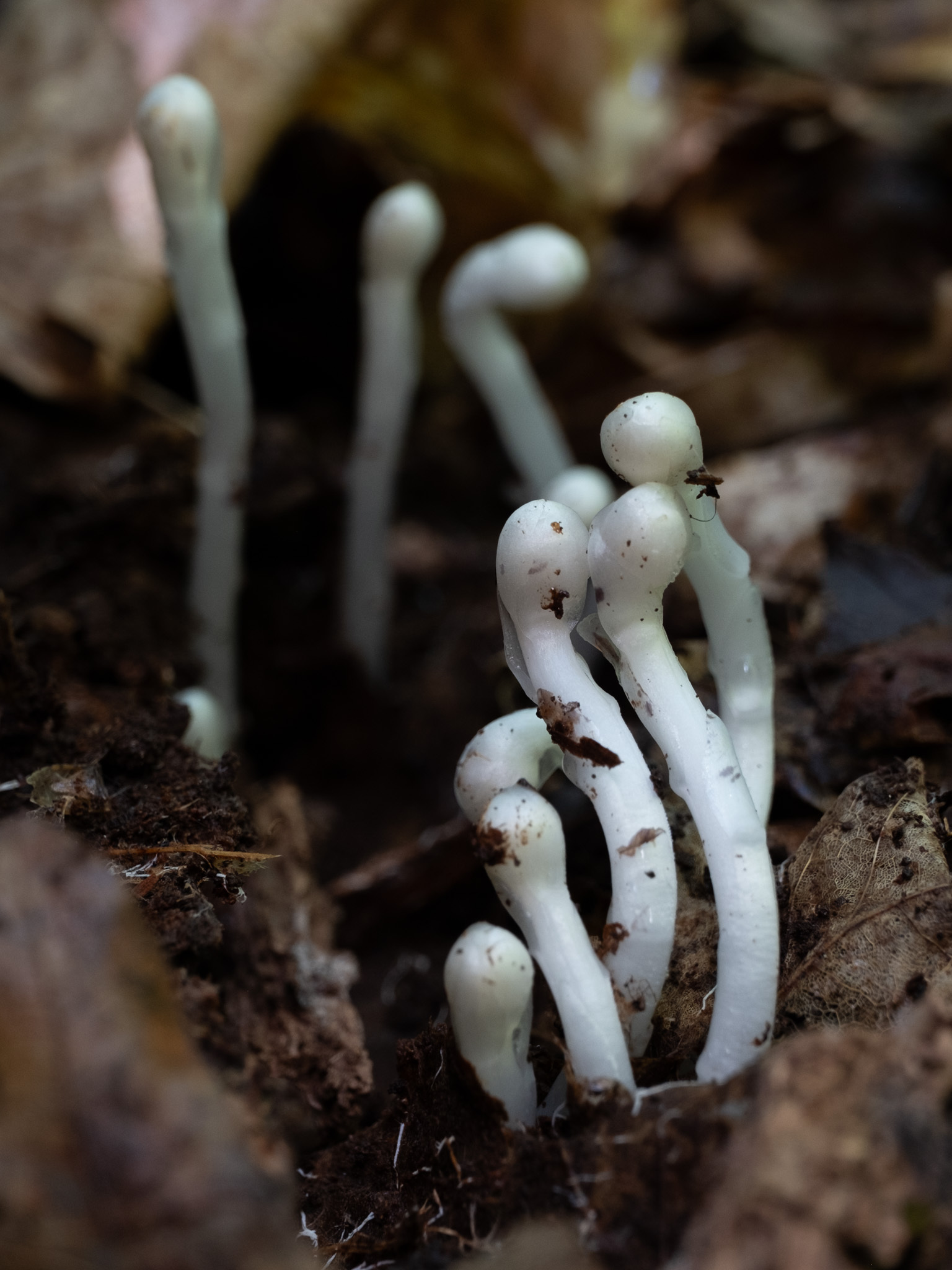
Budding shoots

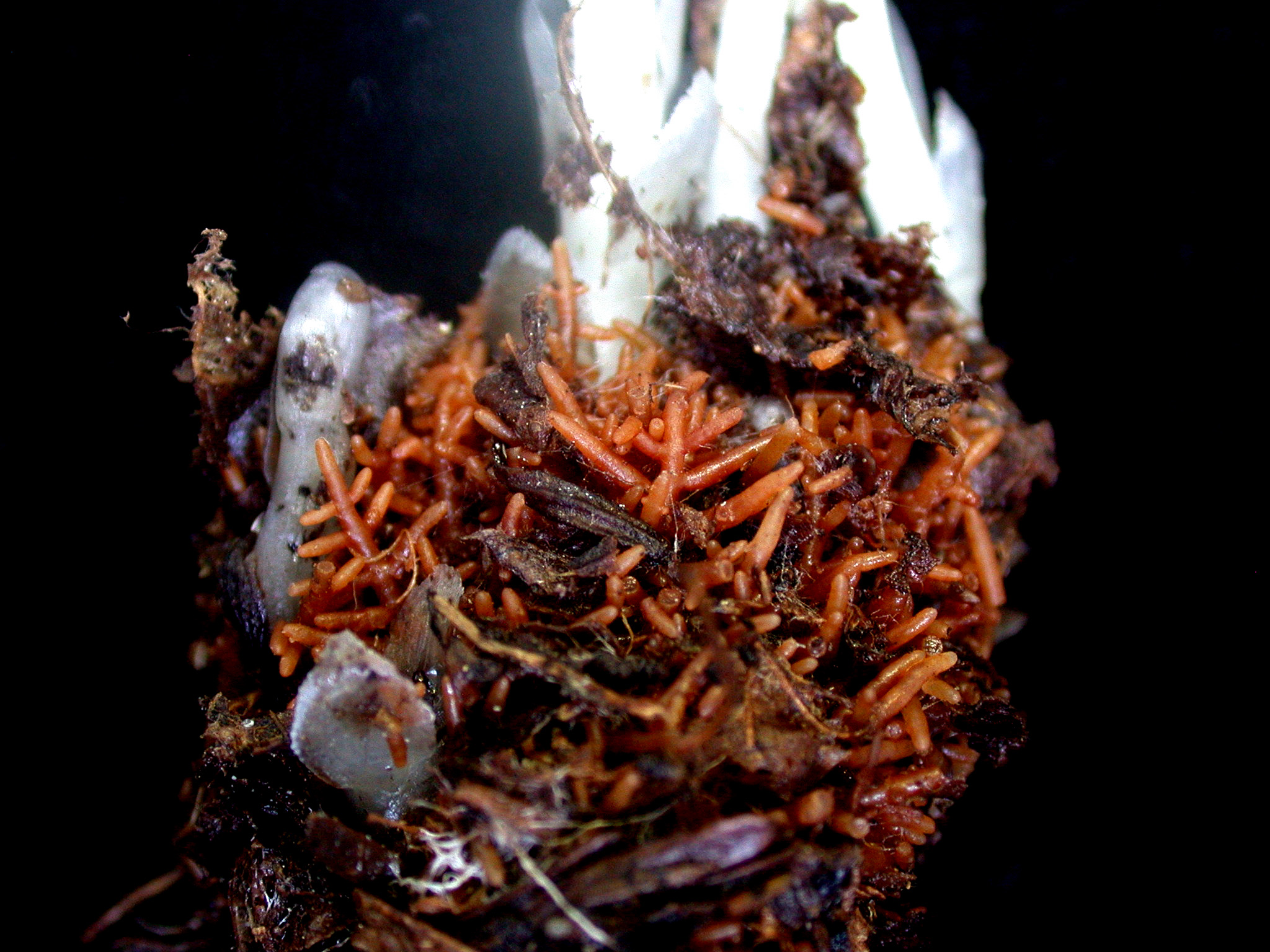
Haustoria

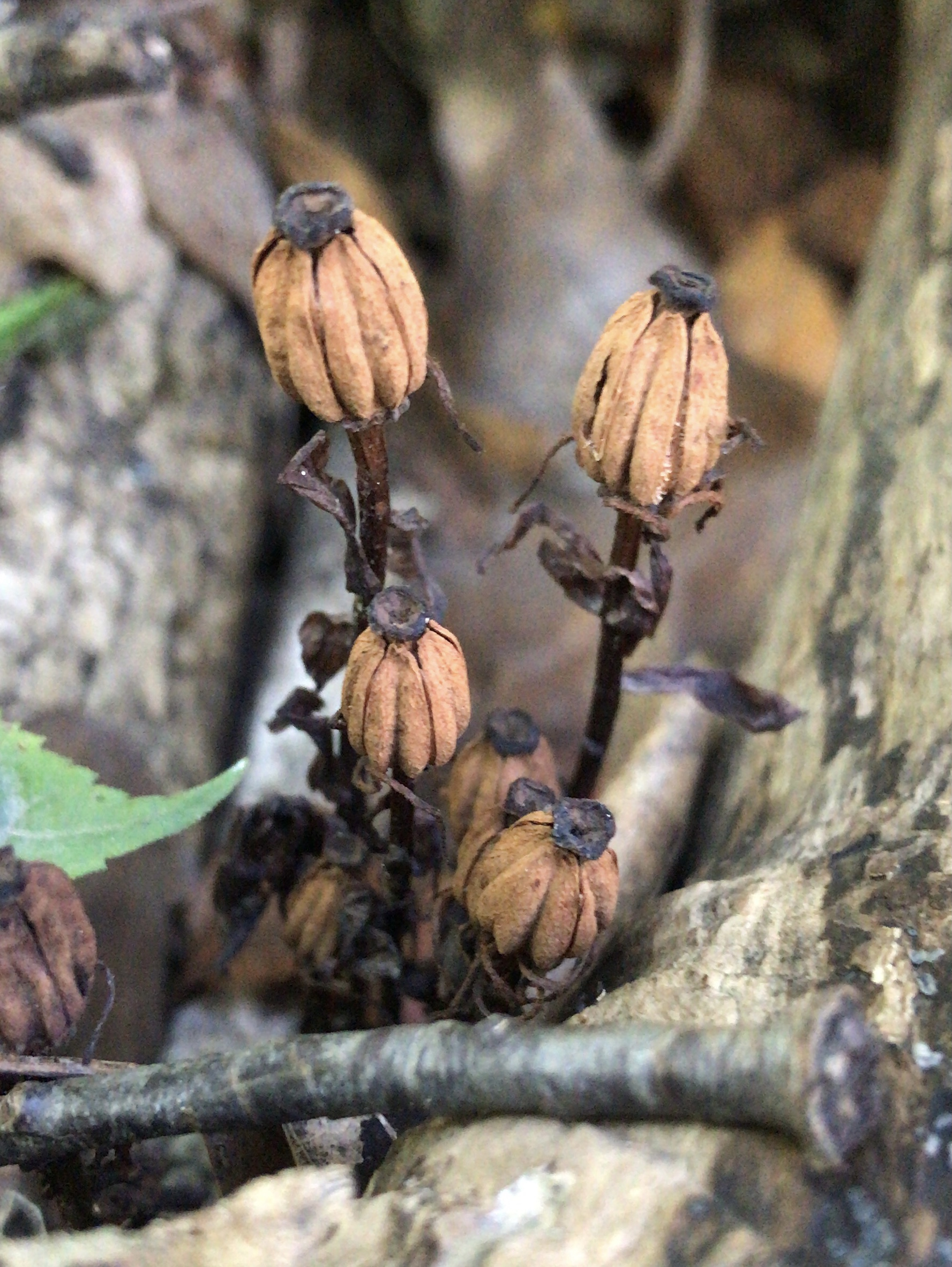
Autumn seed heads, Pennsylvania
