= Myco-heterotrophy =

Symbiotism between certain parasitic plants and fungi

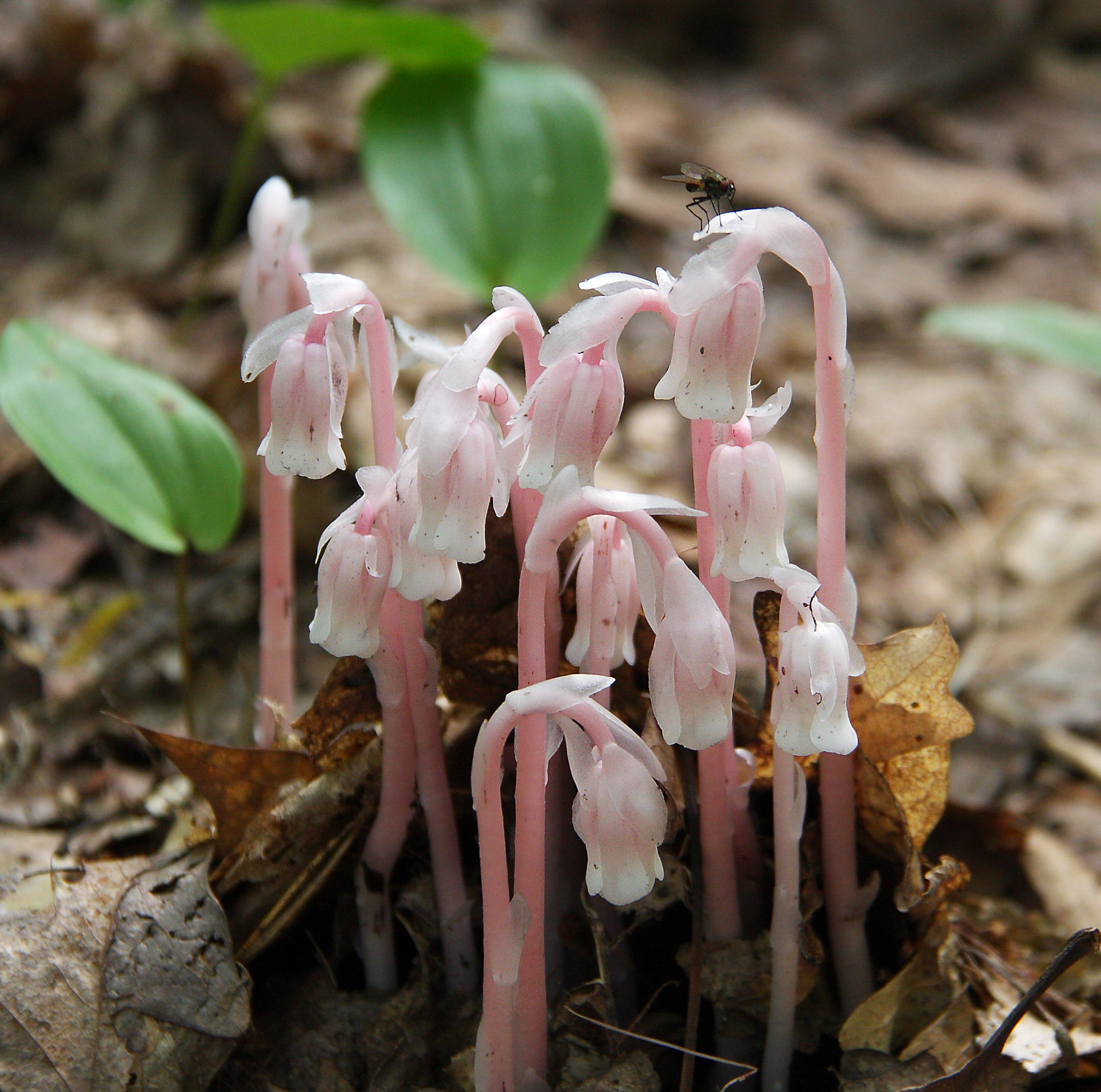
Monotropa uniflora, an obligate myco-heterotroph known to parasitize fungi belonging to the Russulaceae.

Myco-heterotrophy (from Greek μύκης mýkes 'fungus', ἕτερος héteros 'another', 'different' and τροφή trophé 'nutrition') is a symbiotic relationship between certain kinds of plants and fungi, in which the plant gets all or part of its food from parasitism upon fungi rather than from photosynthesis. A myco-heterotroph is the parasitic plant partner in this relationship. Myco-heterotrophy is considered a kind of cheating relationship and myco-heterotrophs are sometimes informally referred to as "mycorrhizal cheaters". This relationship is sometimes referred to as mycotrophy, though this term is also used for plants that engage in mutualistic mycorrhizal relationships.

== Relationship between myco-heterotrophs and host fungi ==
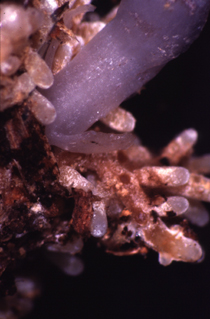
Myco-heterotrophic roots of Monotropa uniflora with Russula brevipes mycelium

Full (or obligate) myco-heterotrophy exists when a non-photosynthetic plant (a plant largely lacking in chlorophyll or otherwise lacking a functional photosystem) gets all of its food from the fungi that it parasitizes. Partial (or facultative) myco-heterotrophy exists when a plant is capable of photosynthesis, but parasitizes fungi as a supplementary food supply. There are also plants, such as some orchid species (e.g., Neottia nidus-avis), that are non-photosynthetic and obligately myco-heterotrophic for part of their life cycle, and photosynthetic and facultatively myco-heterotrophic or non-myco-heterotrophic for the rest of their life cycle. Not all non-photosynthetic or "achlorophyllous" plants are myco-heterotrophic – some non-photosynthetic plants like dodder directly parasitize the vascular tissue of other plants. The partial or full loss of photosynthesis is reflected by extreme physical and functional reductions of plastid genomes in mycoheterotrophic plants, an ongoing evolutionary process.

In the past, non-photosynthetic plants were mistakenly thought to get food by breaking down organic matter in a manner similar to saprotrophic fungi. Such plants were therefore called "saprophytes". It is now known that these plants are not physiologically capable of directly breaking down organic matter and that in order to get food, non-photosynthetic plants must engage in parasitism, either through myco-heterotrophy or direct parasitism of other plants.

The interface between the plant and fungal partners in this association is between the roots of the plant and the mycelium of the fungus. Myco-heterotrophy therefore closely resembles mycorrhiza (and indeed is thought to have evolved from mycorrhizae), except that in myco-heterotrophy, the flow of carbon is from the fungus to the plant, rather than vice versa.

Most myco-heterotrophs can therefore be seen as ultimately being epiparasites, since they take energy from fungi that in turn get their energy from vascular plants. Indeed, much myco-heterotrophy takes place in the context of common mycorrhizal networks, in which plants use mycorrhizal fungi to exchange carbon and nutrients with other plants. In these systems, myco-heterotrophs play the role of "mycorrhizal cheaters", taking carbon from the common network, with no known reward. A special form of mycoheterotrophic association, which appears to be a chimera between the haustorial parasitism of a parasitic plant and mycoheterotrophy, is observed in Parasitaxus usta, the only mycoheterotrophic gymnosperm.

In congruence with older reports, it has been recently shown that some myco-heterotrophic orchids can be supported by saprotrophic fungi, exploiting litter- or wood-decaying fungi. In addition, several green plants (evolutionarily close to myco-heterotrophic species) have been shown to engage in partial myco-heterotrophy, that is, they are able to take carbon from mycorrhizal fungi, in addition to their photosynthetic intake.

== Species diversity of myco-heterotrophs and host fungi ==
Myco-heterotrophs are found among several plant groups, mainly flowering plants. All monotropes and non-photosynthetic orchids are full myco-heterotrophs, as is the non-photosynthetic liverwort Aneura mirabilis (previously considered a species of Cryptothallus). Partial myco-heterotrophy is common in the Gentian family, with a few genera such as Voyria being fully myco-heterotrophic; in photosynthetic orchids; and in a number of other plant groups. Some ferns and clubmosses have myco-heterotrophic gametophyte stages. The fungi that are parasitized by myco-heterotrophs are typically fungi with large energy reserves to draw on, usually mycorrhizal fungi, though there is some evidence that they may also parasitize parasitic fungi that form extensive mycelial networks, such as Armillaria. Examples of fungi parasitized by myco-heterotrophic plants can be found among the ectomycorrhizal, arbuscular mycorrhizal, and orchid mycorrhizal fungi. The great diversity in unrelated plant families with myco-heterotrophic members, as well as the diversity of fungi targeted by myco-heterotrophs, suggests multiple parallel evolutions of myco-heterotrophs from mycorrhizal ancestors.
