= List of myco-heterotrophic genera =

This is a list of plant genera that engage in myco-heterotrophic relationships with fungi. It does not include the fungi that are parasitized by these plants.

== Monocotyledons ==
Burmanniaceae (Dioscoreales)

- Afrothismia - 3 species
- Apteria - 1 species
- Burmannia - 60 species
- Campylosiphon - 1 species
- Dictyostega - 1 species
- Gymnosiphon - 50 species
- Hexapterella - 2 species
- Oxygyne - 28 species
- Thismia - 28 species

Corsiaceae (Liliales)

- Arachnitis - 1 species
- Corsia - 20 species
- Corsiopsis - 1 species

Iridaceae, formerly Geosiridaceae (Asparagales)

- Geosiris - 3 species

Orchidaceae (Asparagales)

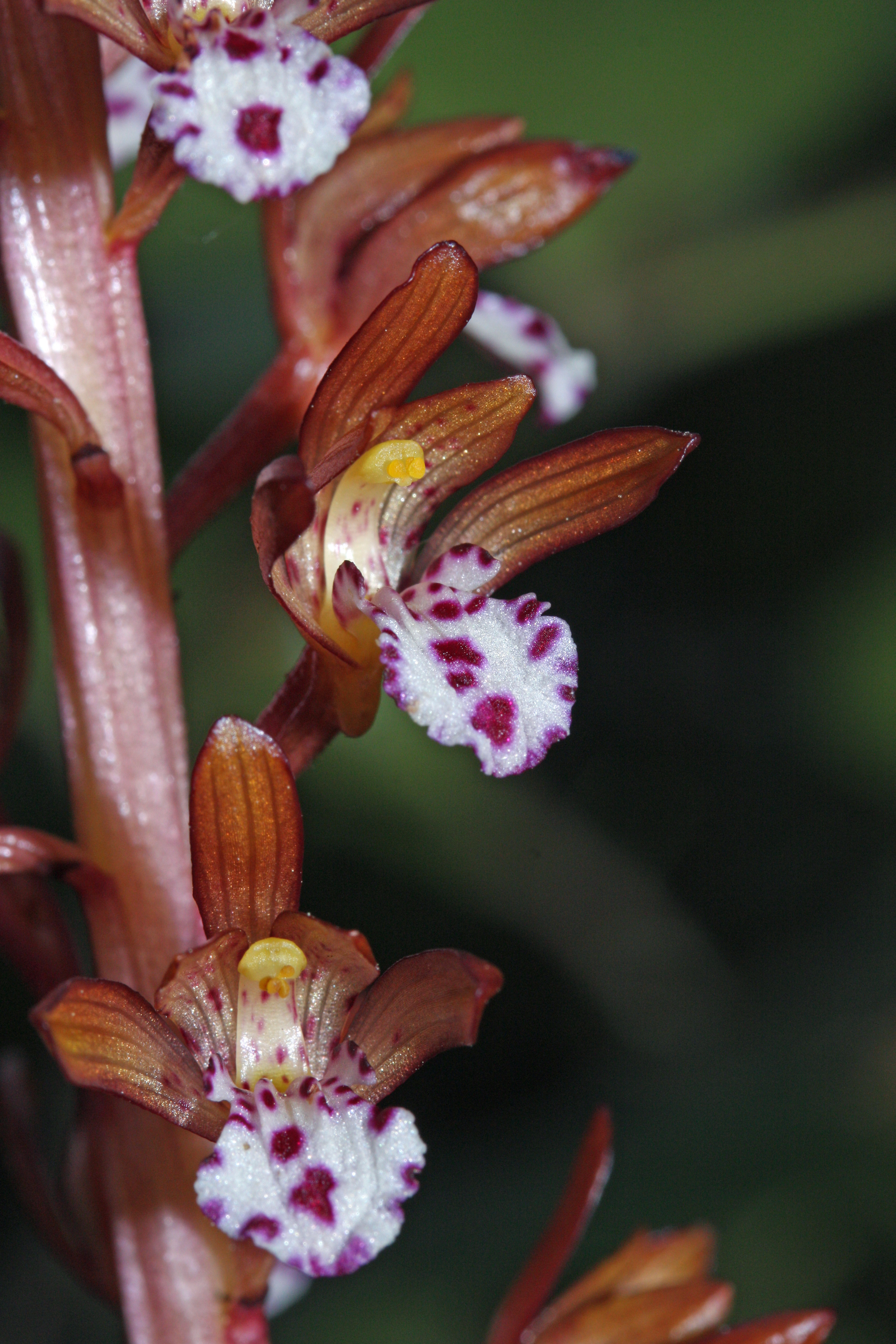
Corallorhiza maculata

This list concerns only the species that are leafless or are losing photosynthetic function.

- Aphyllorchis - 15 species
- Corallorhiza - 15 species
- Corybas - 1 species
- Cymbidium - 1 species
- Cyrtosia - 5 species
- Cystorchis - 8 species
- Cephalanthera - 1 species
- Didymoplexis - 10 species
- Epipogium - 3 species
- Erythrorchis - 2 species
- Eulophia - 1 species
- Galeola - 10 species
- Gastrodia - 35 species
- Hexalectris - 7 species
- Lecanorchis - 20 species
- Limodorum - 1 species
- Neottia - 9 species
- Pterostylis - (as yet unresolved number)
- Rhizanthella - 2 species
- Stereosandra - 1 species
- Stigmatodactylus - 4 species
- Wullschlaegelia - 2 species
- Yoania - 2 species

Petrosaviaceae, also called Melanthiaceae (Petrosaviales)

- Petrosavia - 2-4 species

Triuridaceae (Pandanales), including Lacandoniaceae

- Lacandonia - 1 species
- Sciaphila - 31 species
- Triuris - 3 species

== Eudicots ==
Ericaceae (Ericales)

- Pyroleae (partially myco-heterotrophic apart from Pyrola picta subsp. aphylla)
  - Chimaphila - 4-5 species
  - Moneses - 1 species
  - Orthilia - 1 species
  - Pyrola - 35 species
- Monotropeae
  - Allotropa - 1 species
  - Hemitomes - 1 species
  - Monotropa - 1 (very variable) species
  - Monotropastrum - 4 species
  - Monotropsis - 1 species
  - Pityopus - 1 species
  - Pleuricospora - 2 species
- Pterosporeae
  - Pterospora - 1 species
  - Sarcodes - 1 species

Gentianaceae (Gentianales)

- Bartonia - 3-4 species
- Cotylanthera - 4 species
- Obolaria - 1 species
- Voyria (including Leiphaimos) - 20 species
- Voyriella - 2 species

Polygalaceae (Fabales)

- Epirixanthes - 8 species

== Liverworts ==
- Cryptothallus - 2 species
