= Thismiaceae =

Family of plants

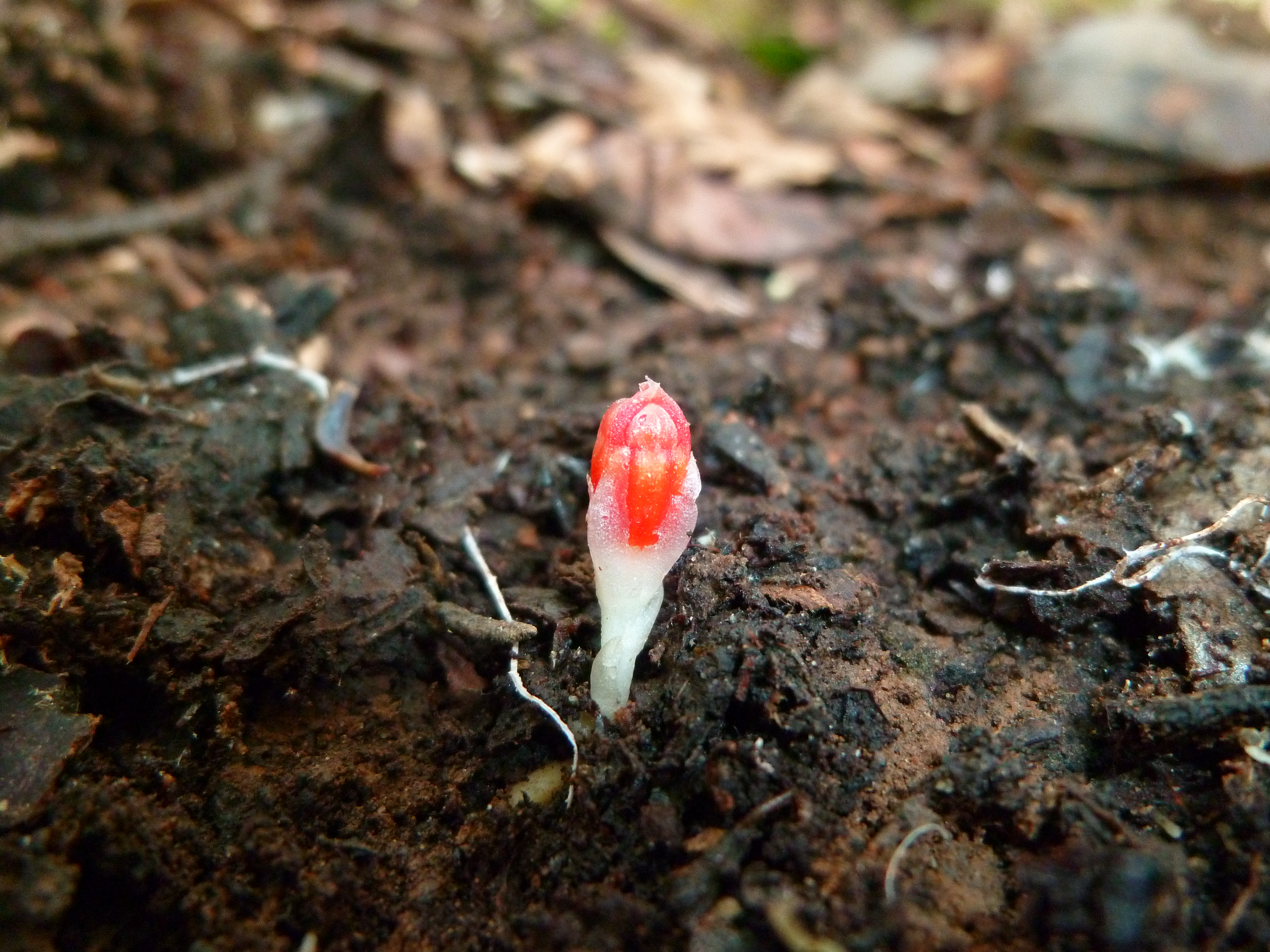
Thismia rodwayi

Thismiaceae is a family of flowering plants whose status is currently uncertain. The Angiosperm Phylogeny Group classifications (APG II, APG III, and APG IV) merge Thismiaceae into Burmanniaceae, noting that some studies have suggested that Thismiaceae, Burmanniaceae and Taccaceae should be separate families, whereas others support their merger.

The family has been recognized by some authors (like J. Hutchinson, Chase et al. 1995, 2000; Caddick et al. 2000; Neyland 2002; Thiele & Jordan 2002, Merckx et al. 2006 and Woodward et al. 2007). Others have supported the APG position of merging the family into Burmanniaceae, sometimes as the tribe Thismieae (Maas-van de Kamer in Kubitzki system and others).

For those who keep the family separate, it consists of six genera, three (Afrothismia, Haplothismia and Oxygyne) are entirely from Old World, Thismia is from tropical areas of both America and Asia, as well as three temperate species in Illinois (U.S.A), Japan and New Zealand, temperate Australia and Tiputinia is from the Amazon basin.

List of genera

- Afrothismia (Engl.) Schltr.
- Haplothismia Airy Shaw
- Oxygyne Schltr.
- Relictithismia Suetsugu, Yas.Nakam. & Tagane
- Thismia Griff.
- Tiputinia P.E. Berry & C. L. Woodw.
