= Miersiella =

Miersiella is the scientific name of two genera of organisms and may refer to:

- Miersiella (crab), a genus of crabs in the family Xanthidae
- Miersiella (plant), a genus of plants in the family Burmanniaceae
