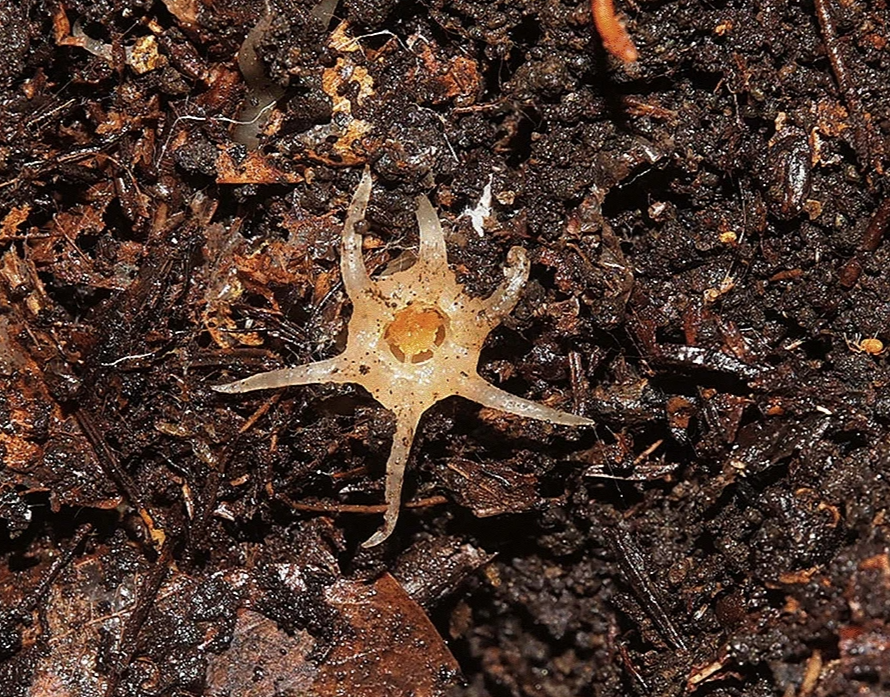

Conservation status
- Critically Endangered (IUCN 3.1)

Scientific classification
- Kingdom: Plantae
- Clade: Tracheophytes
- Clade: Angiosperms
- Clade: Monocots
- Order: Dioscoreales
- Family: Burmanniaceae
- Genus: Relictithismia; Suetsugu & Tagane
- Species: R. kimotsukiensis

Binomial name
- Relictithismia kimotsukiensis Suetsugu, Yas.Nakam. & Tagane

= Relictithismia =

Genus of plants

Relictithismia kimotsukiensis is a species of fairy lanterns. It is placed either in the family Thismiaceae, or in the family Burmanniaceae by those who do not recognize Thismiaceae. It is the only species in the genus Relictithismia. This mycoheterotrophic plant is known only from the Kimotsuki Mountains, in the Ōsumi Peninsula, Kagoshima Prefecture, Kyushu Island, in the southern Japan. The species is assessed as Critically Endangered based on IUCN Guidelines.

== Description ==
Like related genera, Relictithismia lacks chlorophyll and feeds on fungi. The genus is distinguished from the closely related Haplothismia by its solitary flowers, having an annulus, and anther thecae largely separated, whereas in Haplothismia the 2-6 flowers are borne on pseudoracemes, without annulus, and the anther thecae are connate. Flowering individuals, as well as individuals with immature fruits, were observed and collected in the month of June.

== Taxonomy ==
The genus and species were first described in 2024. The genus name is derived from the combination of Latin words "relictus", meaning "left behind", and the generic name "Thismia", whereas the species name "kimotsukiensis" refers to the type locality of the species, Mt. Kimotsuki.

== Distribution ==
This species is known only from the type locality in the Kimotsuki Mountains, in the Kagoshima Prefecture, Kyushu Island, in southern Japan.
