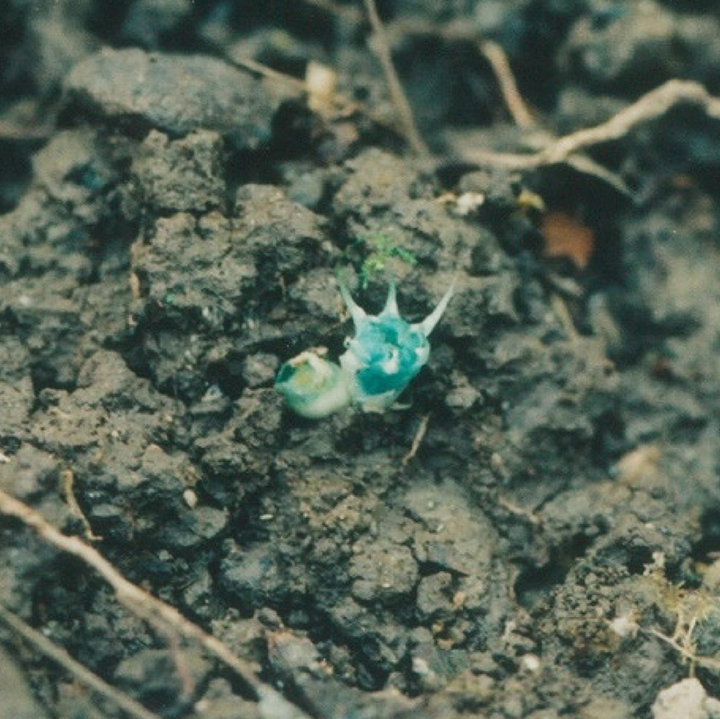
- Oxygyne hyodoi photographed in 1988
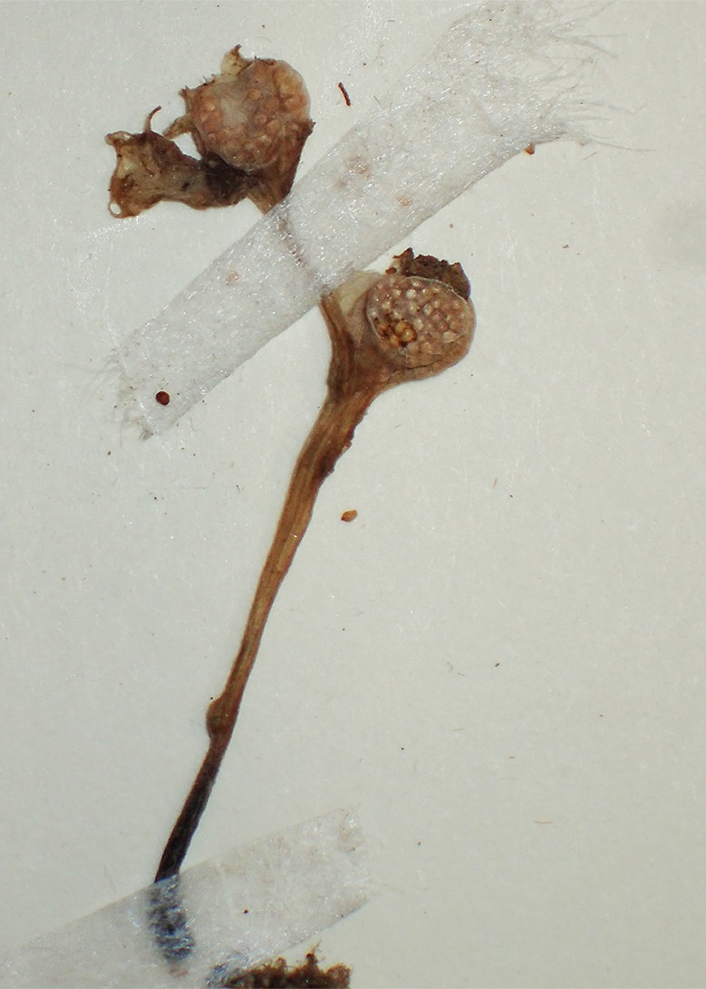
- Oxygyne hyodoi type specimen

Scientific classification
- Kingdom: Plantae
- Clade: Embryophytes
- Clade: Tracheophytes
- Clade: Angiosperms
- Clade: Monocots
- Order: Dioscoreales
- Family: Burmanniaceae
- Genus: Oxygyne
- Species: O. hyodoi

Binomial name
- Oxygyne hyodoi C.Abe & Akasawa

Synonyms
- Saionia hyodoi (C.Abe & Akasawa) H.Ohashi

= Oxygyne hyodoi =

Species of plant endemic to Japan

Oxygyne hyodoi, commonly known as hina-no-bonbori (Japanese: ヒナノボンボリ), is a species of achlorophyllous mycoheterotrophic plant in the family Burmanniaceae. It is endemic to the island of Shikoku in Japan, where it is known only from the type locality. The small blue flowers appear in October.

First described in 1989 based on a specimen collected the year prior, this species was declared extinct in 2018 after decades of unsuccessful relocation attempts, however, a population of approximately 15 plants was rediscovered at the type locality in 2019.

== Taxonomy and history ==
Oxygyne hyodoi was described in 1989 by Japanese botanists Chikaichi Abe and Yoshiyuki Akasawa based on specimens collected in October of the previous year from a forest in the town of Nishiumi, now part of Ainan, on the Japanese island of Shikoku. It was the first species in the genus Oxygyne to be described outside of west Africa. The specific epithet hyodoi honours Shoji Hyodo, (Note: Japanese: 兵頭正治, romanized: Hyōdō Shōji.) the collector of the type specimen. The type specimen is held in the herbarium of the University of Tokyo, and the species is locally known as hina-no-bonbori (Japanese: ヒナノボンボリ).

Following the collection of the type specimen in October 1988, O. hyodoi would be detected at its type locality again in 1989 and 1990 by the original collector. An immature plant purported to be O. hyodoi was collected near Kobe City in 1993, however, this was later determined to instead represent a new species, Thismia kobensis. O. hyodoi would be declared extinct by the authors of a 2018 monograph on the genus Oxygyne after repeated annual surveys of the type locality failed to locate any further specimens. The species would be rediscovered at the type locality in October 2019, nearly 30 years after it was last seen, with 15 individual plants recorded.

== Distribution and habitat ==
Oxygyne hyodoi is known only from the type locality, the understorey of an evergreen forest in the town of Nishiumi, now part of Ainan, on the Japanese island of Shikoku. This habitat is dominated by Neolitsea sericea, Cinnamomum chekiangense, and Diospyros japonica, with Damnacanthus indicus, Ligustrum japonicum, and Maesa japonica also present.

== Description ==
Oxygyne hyodoi is a small herbaceous, achlorophyllous, mycoheterotrophic perennial plant, lacking functional leaves. The roots, measuring 1–2 cm (0.39–0.79 in) long, are a creamy white colour with fusiform internodes. The stem is upright and glabrous, measuring approximately 2–3 cm (0.79–1.18 in) tall. The leaves are reduced to membranaceous, scale-like structures measuring just 1.2–1.6 mm long. The racemose inflorescence bears one to three blue-green flowers on short peduncles, with 3 mm long bracts at base of the flowers. The perianth of the flower, composed of six glabrous lobes, is urceolate-campanulate in shape and approximately 3 mm long. The lobes are approximately 2 mm long and 3–4 mm wide, hermispherical to triangular in shape with long, thin tips. Each flower has three downcurved stamens emerging from the junctions of the pernianth lobes and the edge of the annulus. The annulus forms a convex dome over the mouth of the perianth, with a central opening through which the stamens descend. The singular style is thick and approximately 1.4 mm long with three club-shaped, laterally oriented appendages on the upper surface and three stigmas. Flowering occurs in October.

== Ecology ==
Oxygyne hyodoi has been recorded growing alongside Burmannia nepalensis, a fellow mycoheterotroph. An analysis published in the journal New Phytologist in 2022 found that all Oxygene species, including O. hyodoi, as well as the sympatric B. nepalensis, form mycohrrhizal associations exclusively with operational taxonomic units (OTUs) belonging to the family Glomeraceae. The primary mycobionts of O. hyodoi were found to be two OTUs belonging to the Rhizophagus/Sclerocystis clade. The main mycobiont of O. hyodoi was also identified as the primary host fungus of Thismia tentaculata, an undescribed Australian Thismia species, and three African Afrothismia species, while the secondary mycobiont of O. hyodoi was also identified as the exclusive fungal partner of the Taiwanese species Thismia huangii.
