= Burmannia grandiflora =

Conservation status
- Least Concern (IUCN 3.1)

Scientific classification
- Kingdom: Plantae
- Clade: Tracheophytes
- Clade: Angiosperms
- Clade: Monocots
- Order: Dioscoreales
- Family: Burmanniaceae
- Genus: Burmannia
- Species: B. grandiflora

Binomial name
- Burmannia grandiflora Malme

Species of flowering plant

Burmannia grandiflora is a flowering plant in the family Burmanniaceae found in Colombia, central Brazil, and Bolivia. It grows mostly on wet savannas, sandy soil, from sea level to a height of 1230 meters.
