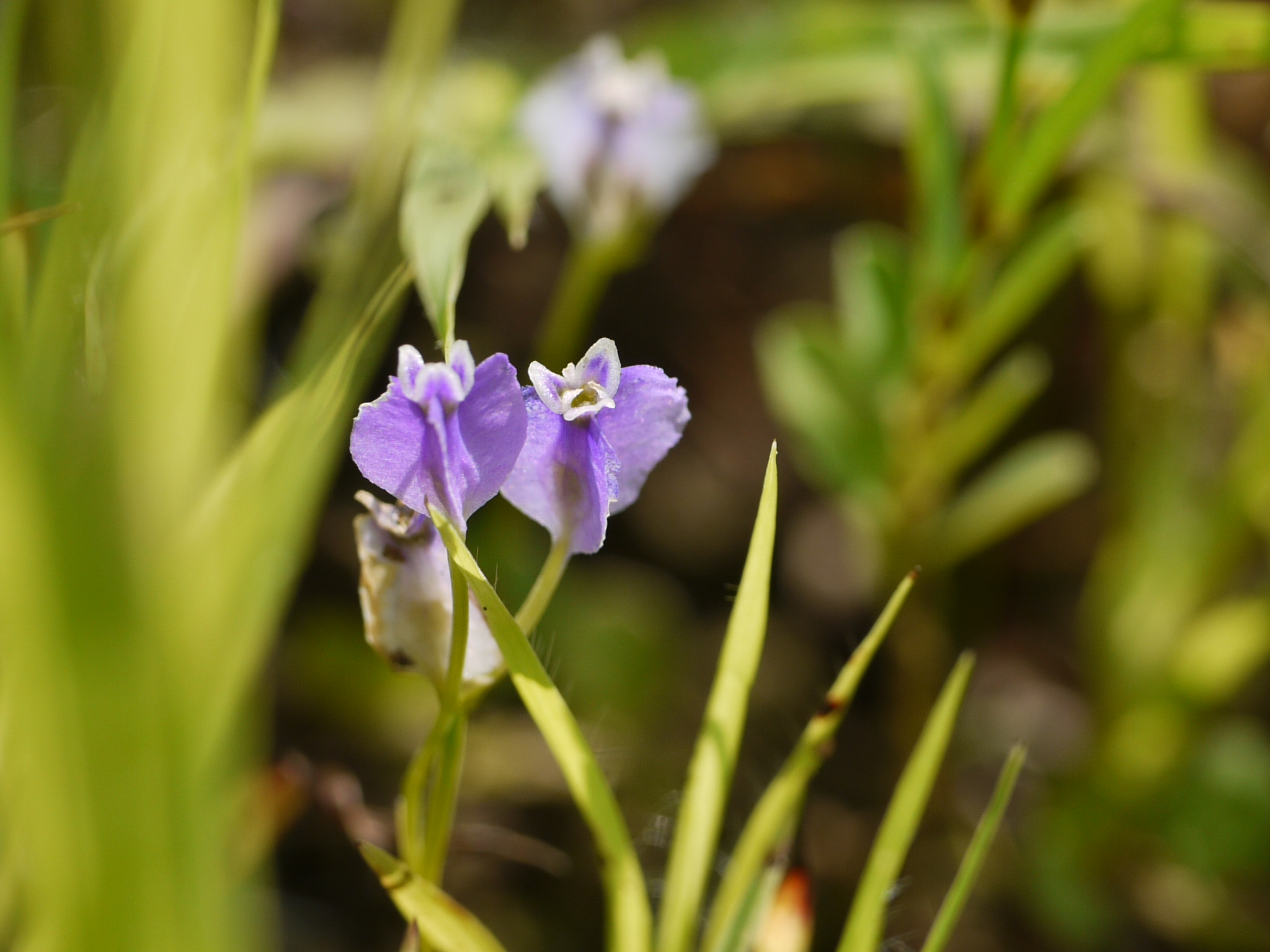

Conservation status
- Least Concern (IUCN 3.1)

Scientific classification
- Kingdom: Plantae
- Clade: Tracheophytes
- Clade: Angiosperms
- Clade: Monocots
- Order: Dioscoreales
- Family: Burmanniaceae
- Genus: Burmannia
- Species: B. coelestis

Binomial name
- Burmannia coelestis (D.Don)

= Burmannia coelestis =

Species of flowering plant

Burmannia coelestis is a partially mycoheterotrophic species of plant in the genus Burmannia. It is widespread, occurring in South to Southeast Asia, New Guinea, Australia, and in Micronesia. It is usually found in wet places, such as in marshes, swamps, and around the edges of pools.
