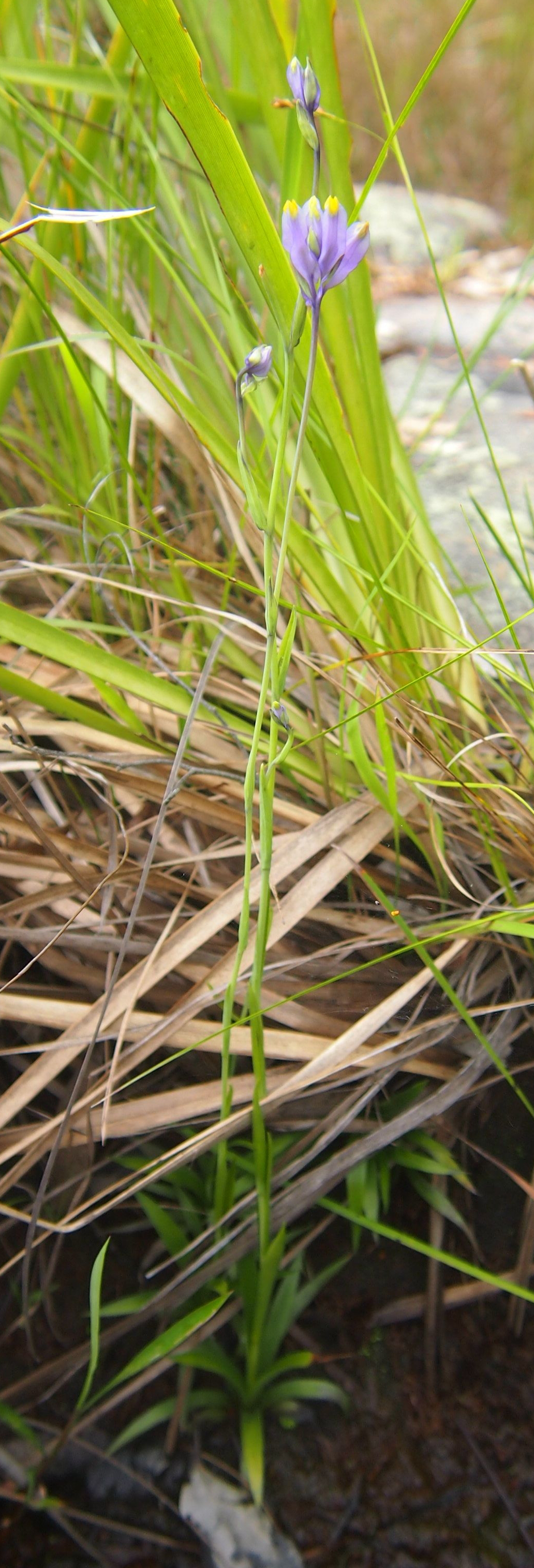

Conservation status
- Least Concern (IUCN 3.1)

Scientific classification
- Kingdom: Plantae
- Clade: Tracheophytes
- Clade: Angiosperms
- Clade: Monocots
- Order: Dioscoreales
- Family: Burmanniaceae
- Genus: Burmannia
- Species: B. disticha

Binomial name
- Burmannia disticha L.

= Burmannia disticha =

Species of flowering plant

Burmannia disticha is a species of plant that is occasionally seen in South and Southeast Asia, Australia, and New Guinea. It is found in freshwater systems and can grow in swamps, boggy areas, and wet rocks.
