= Afrothismia winkleri =

Conservation status
- Endangered (IUCN 3.1)

Scientific classification
- Kingdom: Plantae
- Clade: Tracheophytes
- Clade: Angiosperms
- Clade: Monocots
- Order: Dioscoreales
- Family: Burmanniaceae
- Genus: Afrothismia
- Species: A. winkleri

Binomial name
- Afrothismia winkleri (Engl.) Schltr.

Synonyms
- Thismia winkleriEngl.

Species of flowering plant

Afrothismia winkleri is a species of plant in the Burmanniaceae family native to Cameroon. Its natural habitat is subtropical or tropical moist lowland forests, and it is threatened by habitat loss. It was first described (as Thismia winkleri) by German botanist Adolf Engler in 1905.

This plant is holomycotrophic, meaning that it doesn't perform photosynthesis, and instead it forms a symbiotic relationship with certain species of fungi, from which it draws all of it nutrients. Only the flowers and fruit of the plant appear above ground.

In 2023, botanist Martin Cheek placed the species in the new family Afrothismiaceae, however Plants of the World Online and other authorities still keep it in the family Burmanniaceae.
