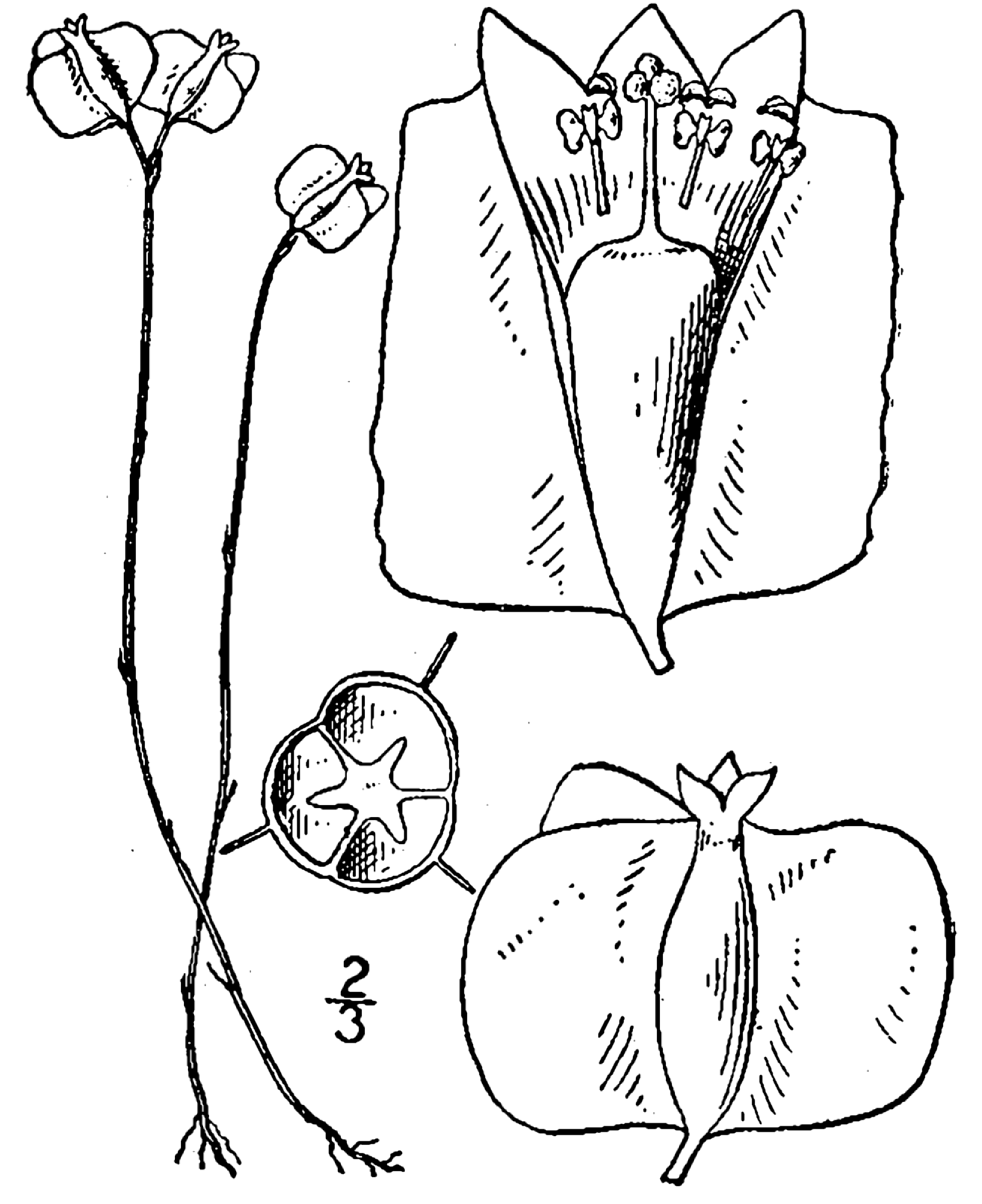

Scientific classification
- Kingdom: Plantae
- Clade: Tracheophytes
- Clade: Angiosperms
- Clade: Monocots
- Order: Dioscoreales
- Family: Burmanniaceae
- Genus: Burmannia
- Species: B. biflora

Binomial name
- Burmannia biflora L.

Synonyms
- Tripterella biflora (L.) Schult. & Schult. f.; Tripterella coerulea Nutt.

= Burmannia biflora =

Northern bluethread

Species of flowering plant

Burmannia biflora, common name northern bluethread, is a plant species native to Cuba, the Bahamas and to the southeastern United States. It has been reported from Puerto Rico, eastern Texas, Louisiana, southwestern Arkansas (Hempstead County), southern Mississippi, southern Alabama, Florida, Georgia, South Carolina, North Carolina and southeastern Virginia.

Burmannia biflora grows in wet areas (bogs, swamps, ditches, lake shores, etc.) at elevations less than 100 m. It is an annual herb up to 20 cm tall. Flowers are borne in a loose cyme of up to 12 flowers, blue, 3-winged, sometimes white around the edges.
