= Burmannia pusilla =

Conservation status
- Least Concern (IUCN 3.1)

Scientific classification
- Kingdom: Plantae
- Clade: Tracheophytes
- Clade: Angiosperms
- Clade: Monocots
- Order: Dioscoreales
- Family: Burmanniaceae
- Genus: Burmannia
- Species: B. pusilla

Binomial name
- Burmannia pusilla (Miers) Thwaites

Synonyms
- Homotypic Synonyms: Burmannia coelestis var. pusilla (Miers) Trimen; Cyananthus pusillus (Miers) Wall.; Gonianthes pusilla Miers

Species of flowering plant

Burmannia pusilla is a species of flowering plant in the famlily Burmanniaceae. It is an annual herb, found in wet or damp places. It is native to Cambodia, China (Yunnan province), India (Assam, Goa, Karnataka, Kerala, Maharashtra, Meghalaya, Tamil Nadu), Laos, Malaysia, Myanmar, Singapore, Thailand, and Vietnam.
