= Gymnosiphon cymosus =

Conservation status
- Least Concern (IUCN 3.1)

Scientific classification
- Kingdom: Plantae
- Clade: Tracheophytes
- Clade: Angiosperms
- Clade: Monocots
- Order: Dioscoreales
- Family: Burmanniaceae
- Genus: Gymnosiphon
- Species: G. cymosus

Binomial name
- Gymnosiphon cymosus (Benth.) Benth. & Hook.f.

Species of flowering plant

Gymnosiphon cymosus is a flowering plant in the family Burmanniaceae. It is found in Brazil, Colombia, Peru, Suriname, and Venezuela. They grow in lowland tropical rainforest, remaining subterranean until when conditions are favorable, coming up to flower and fruit.
