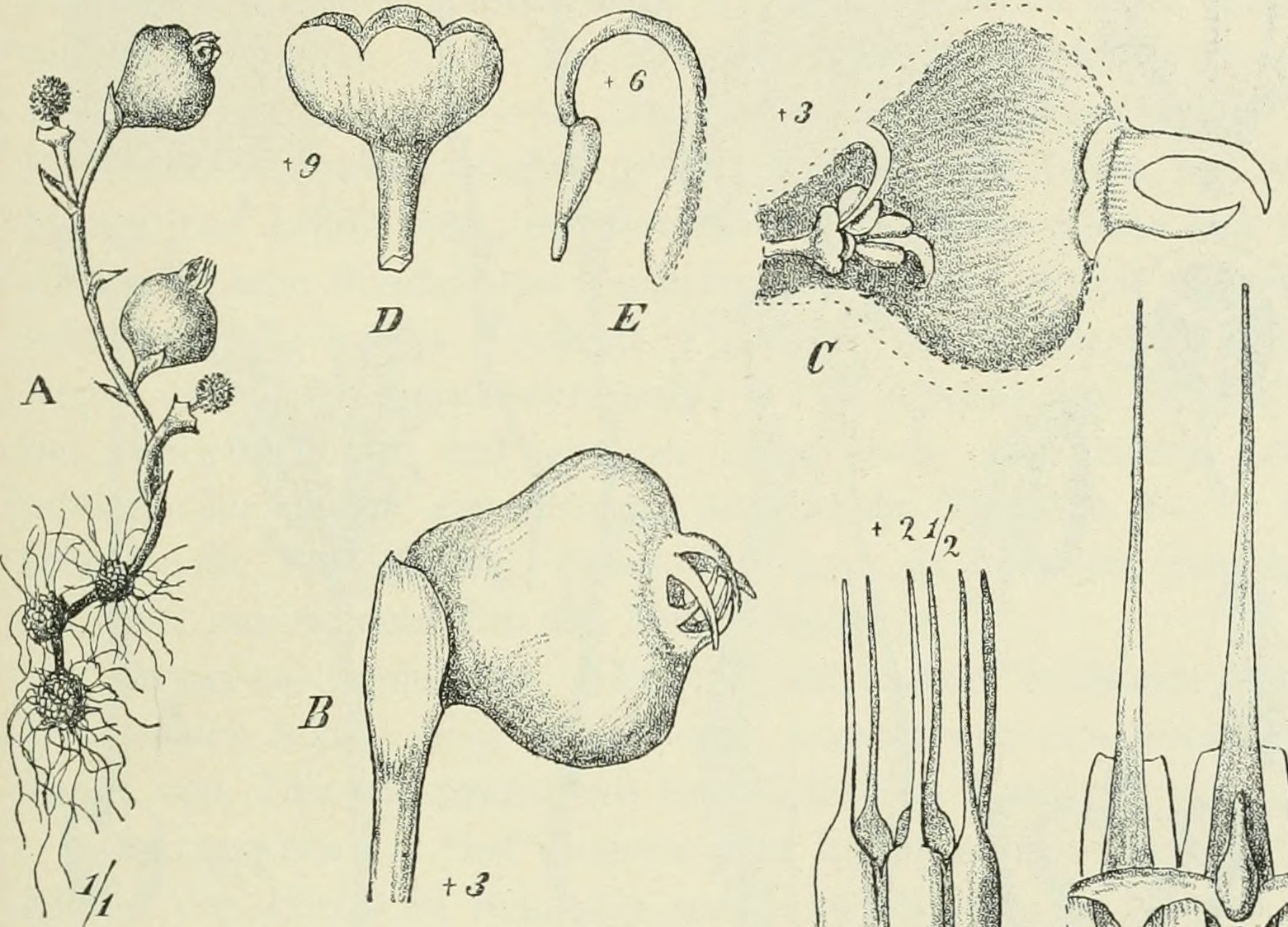
- Illustrations of Afrothismia pachyantha

Conservation status
- Critically Endangered (IUCN 3.1)

Scientific classification
- Kingdom: Plantae
- Clade: Tracheophytes
- Clade: Angiosperms
- Clade: Monocots
- Order: Dioscoreales
- Family: Burmanniaceae
- Genus: Afrothismia
- Species: A. pachyantha

Binomial name
- Afrothismia pachyantha Schltr.

Synonyms
- Thismia pachyantha (Schltr.) Engl.

= Afrothismia pachyantha =

Species of flowering plant

Afrothismia pachyantha is a species of plant in the family Burmanniaceae. It is a holomycotrophic rhizomatous geophyte endemic to Cameroon. Its natural habitat is tropical moist lowland evergreen forests on Mount Cameroon and Mount Kupe at about 700 metres elevation. It is threatened by habitat loss. The species was first discovered in 1905 on Mount Cameroon, where it may be extinct, and rediscovered in 1995 on Mount Kupe, making it a Lazarus taxon.
