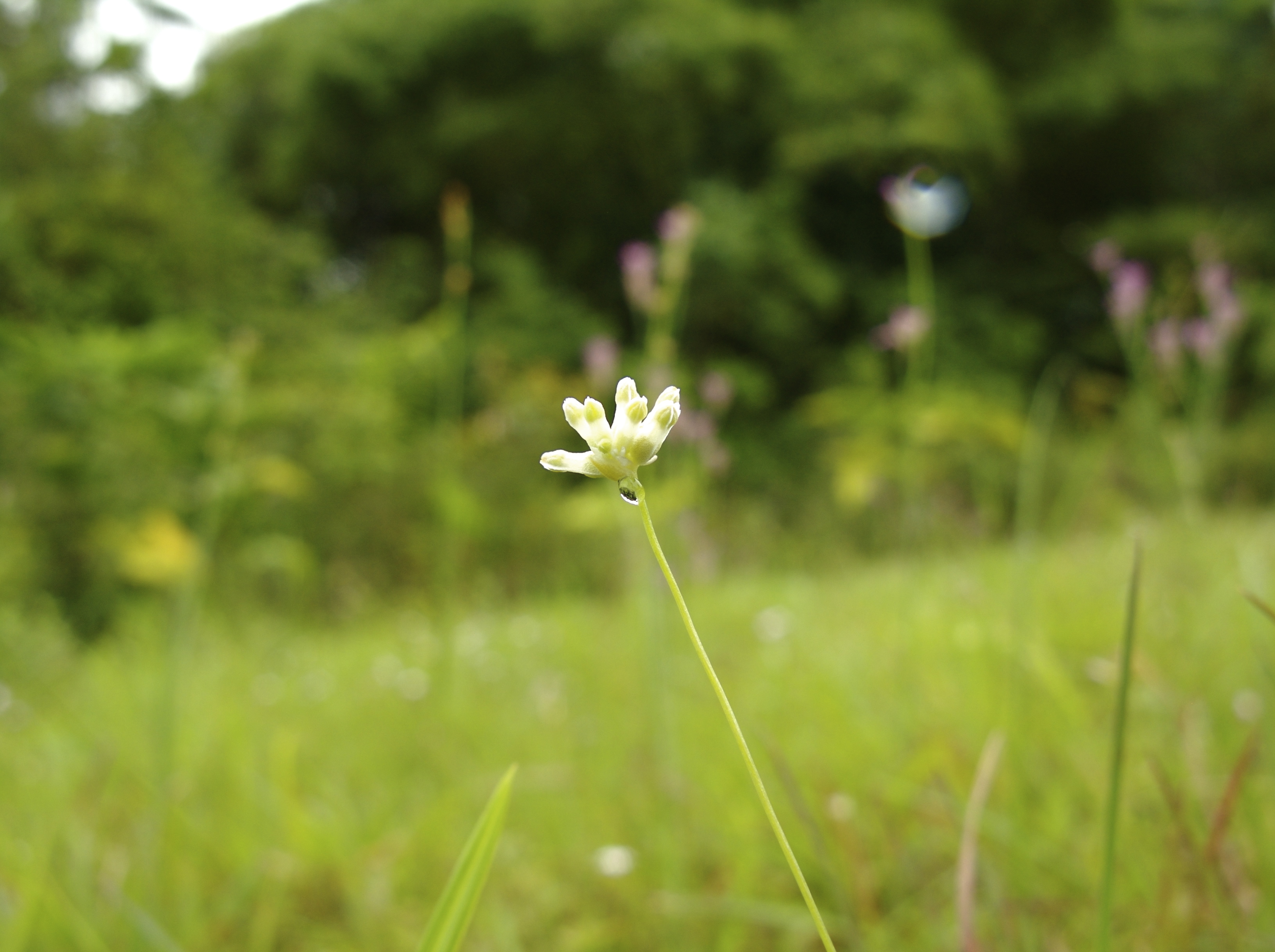
- Burmannia capitata, French Guiana
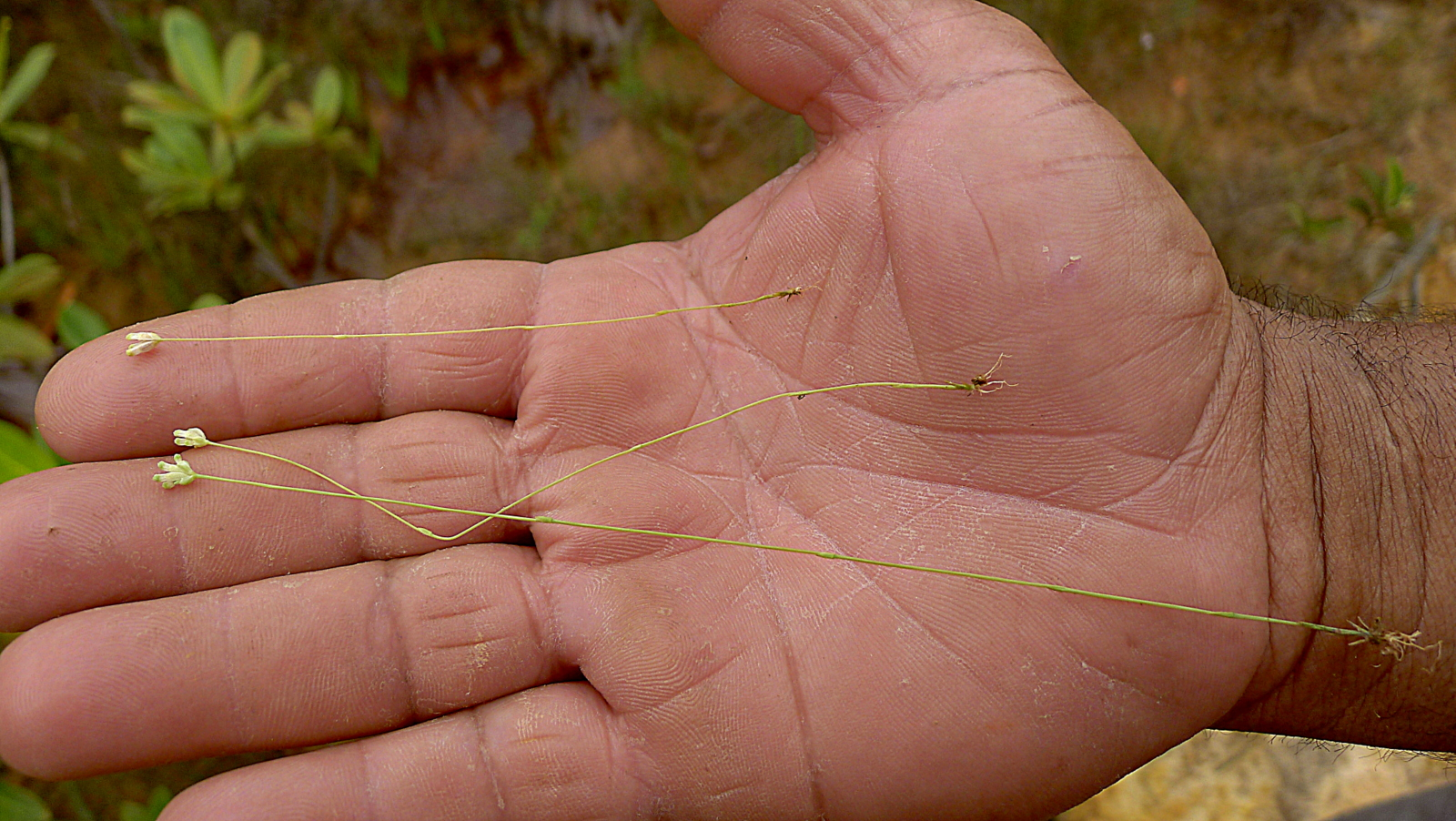

Scientific classification
- Kingdom: Plantae
- Clade: Tracheophytes
- Clade: Angiosperms
- Clade: Monocots
- Order: Dioscoreales
- Family: Burmanniaceae
- Genus: Burmannia
- Species: B. capitata

Binomial name
- Burmannia capitata (Walter ex J.F. Gmel.) Mart.

Synonyms
- Vogelia capitata Walter ex J.F. Gmel.; Burmannia bracteosa Gleason; Burmannia capitata (Walter ex J.F. Gmel.) Chapm.; Burmannia capitata f. bracteosa (Gleason) Jonker; Gyrotheca capitata (Walter ex J.F. Gmel.) Morong; Tripterella capitata (Walter ex J.F. Gmel.) F. Michx.

= Burmannia capitata =

Species of flowering plant

Burmannia capitata is a plant species widespread across the West Indies and much of Latin America. It grows in wet areas at elevations less than 100 m. It has been reported from Argentina, Belize, Bolivia, Brazil, Cuba, the Dominican Republic, Haiti, Jamaica, Puerto Rico, Trinidad and Tobago, Colombia, Costa Rica, French Guiana, Guyana, Honduras, southern Mexico (Campeche, Chiapas, Veracruz, Tabasco), Nicaragua, Panama, Paraguay, Suriname, Venezuela, and the United States (North Carolina, South Carolina, Georgia, Florida, Alabama, Mississippi, Louisiana, Puerto Rico, Texas, Oklahoma)

Burmannia capitata is an annual herb up to 35 cm tall. It has 0-3 basal leaves plus several cauline (stem) leaves, all lanceolate, up to 8 mm long. Inflorescence is a small cyme frequently resembling a head, with up to 25 flowers. Flowers are 3-ribbed or slightly 3-winged. Flowers are white, about 1 mm in diameter.
