= Gymnosiphon usambaricus =

Conservation status
- Endangered (IUCN 3.1)

Scientific classification
- Kingdom: Plantae
- Clade: Tracheophytes
- Clade: Angiosperms
- Clade: Monocots
- Order: Dioscoreales
- Family: Burmanniaceae
- Genus: Gymnosiphon
- Species: G. usambaricus

Binomial name
- Gymnosiphon usambaricus Engl.

Synonyms
- Dictyostega usambarica (Engl.) Engl.; Ptychomeria usambarica (Engl.) Schltr.

Species of flowering plant

Gymnosiphon usambaricus is a species in the plant family Burmanniaceae. It is endangered due to habitat loss with an estimated 2500 mature individuals left. It is native to Kenya and Tanzania, and is found in the leaf litter in evergreen forests.
