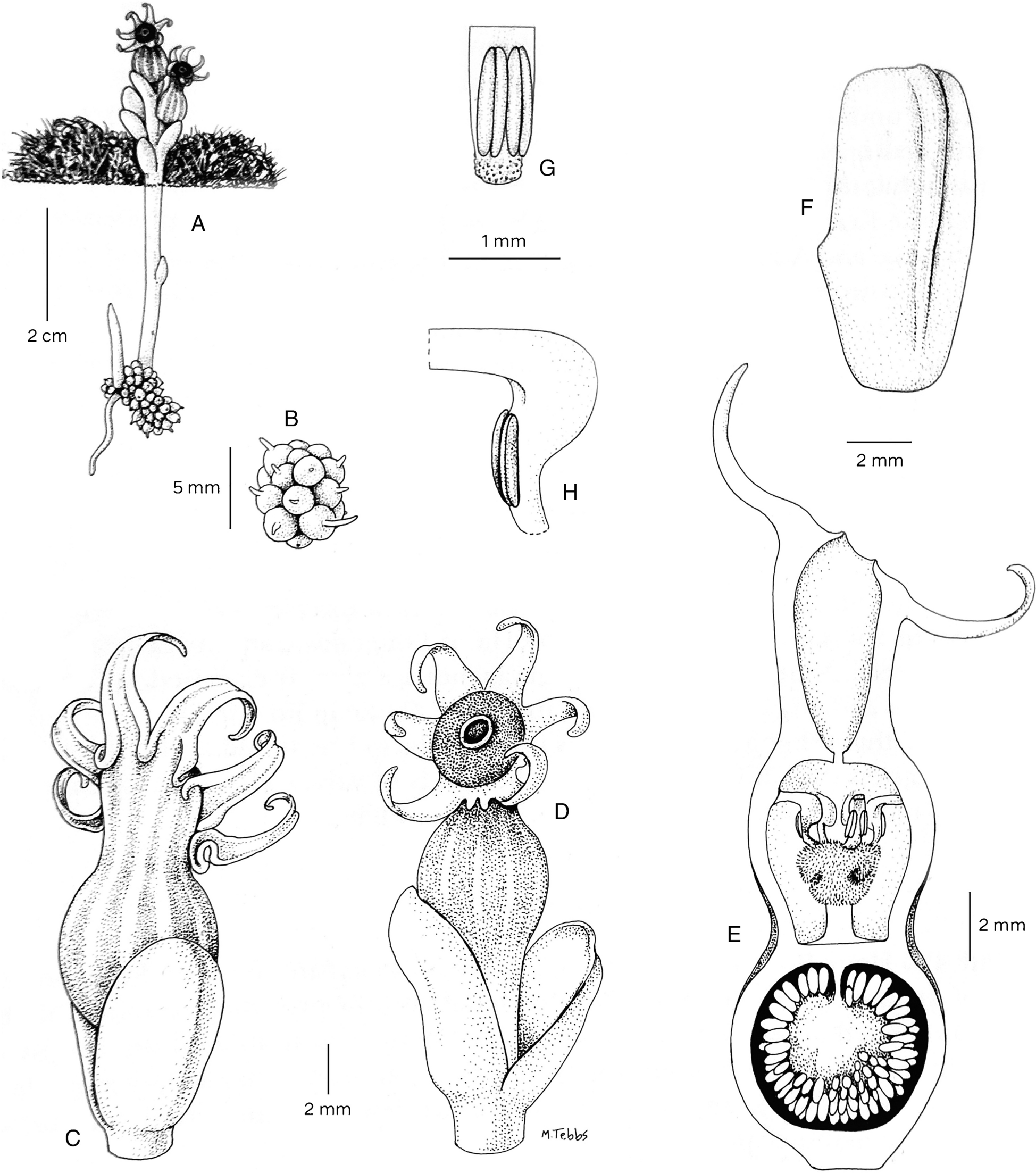

Conservation status
- Critically Endangered (IUCN 3.1)

Scientific classification
- Kingdom: Plantae
- Clade: Embryophytes
- Clade: Tracheophytes
- Clade: Angiosperms
- Clade: Monocots
- Order: Dioscoreales
- Family: Burmanniaceae
- Genus: Afrothismia
- Species: A. baerae

Binomial name
- Afrothismia baerae Cheek

= Afrothismia baerae =

Species of flowering plant

Afrothismia baerae is a member of the genus Afrothismia. It is endemic to Kenya and is critically endangered due to loss of habitat.
