= Afrothismia insignis =

Conservation status
- Vulnerable (IUCN 3.1)

Scientific classification
- Kingdom: Plantae
- Clade: Tracheophytes
- Clade: Angiosperms
- Clade: Monocots
- Order: Dioscoreales
- Family: Burmanniaceae
- Genus: Afrothismia
- Species: A. insignis

Binomial name
- Afrothismia insignis (Cowley)

Species of flowering plant

Afrothismia insignis is a member of the genus Afrothismia. It is endemic to Tanzania. The species is vulnerable due to habitat loss and potential future threats.
