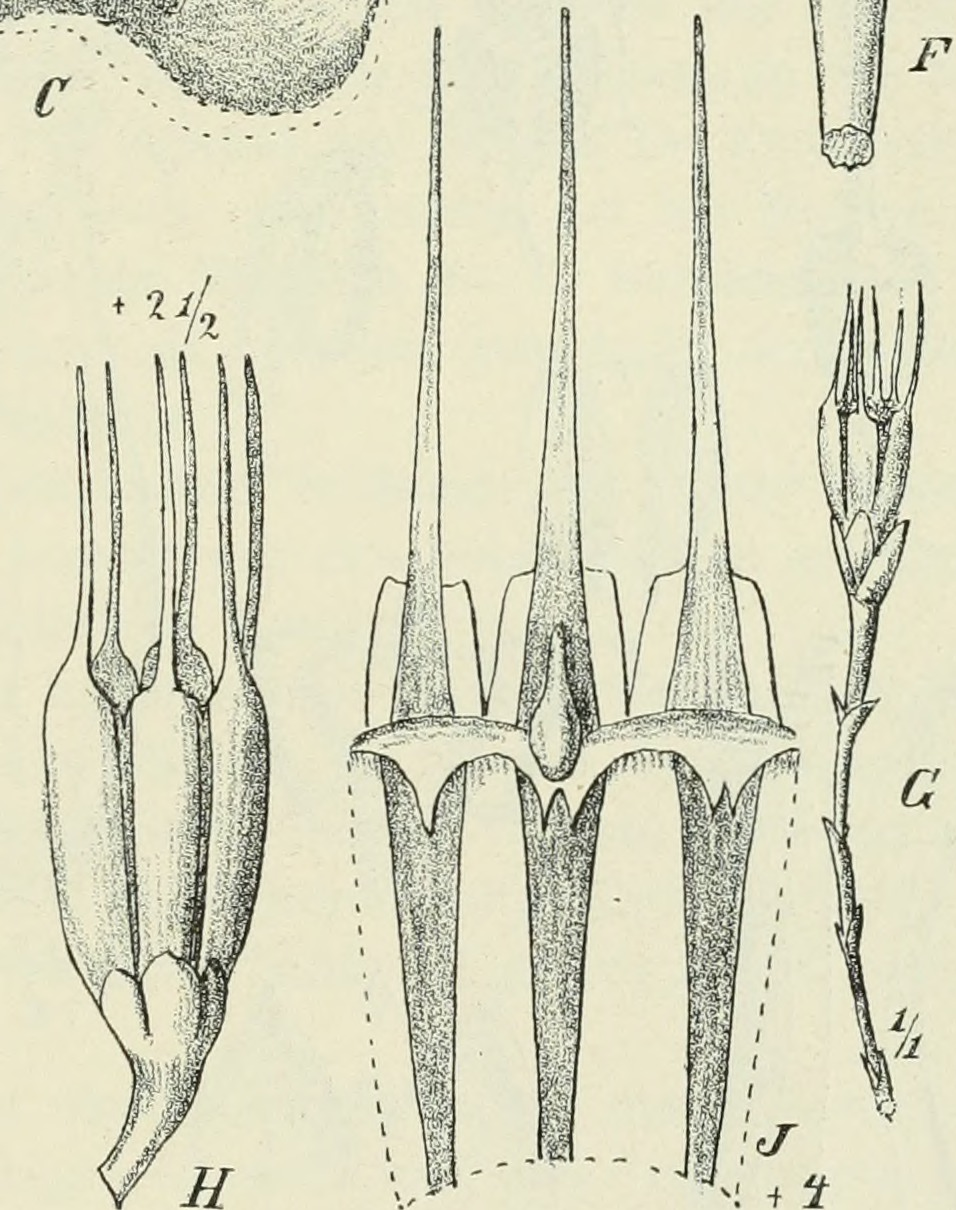
- Illustrations of Oxygyne triandra

Conservation status
- Critically Endangered (IUCN 2.3)

Scientific classification
- Kingdom: Plantae
- Clade: Tracheophytes
- Clade: Angiosperms
- Clade: Monocots
- Order: Dioscoreales
- Family: Burmanniaceae
- Genus: Oxygyne
- Species: O. triandra

Binomial name
- Oxygyne triandra Schlechter

= Oxygyne triandra =

Species of flowering plant

Oxygyne triandra is a species of plant in the Burmanniaceae family. It is endemic to Cameroon. Its natural habitat is subtropical or tropical dry forests. It is threatened by habitat loss.
