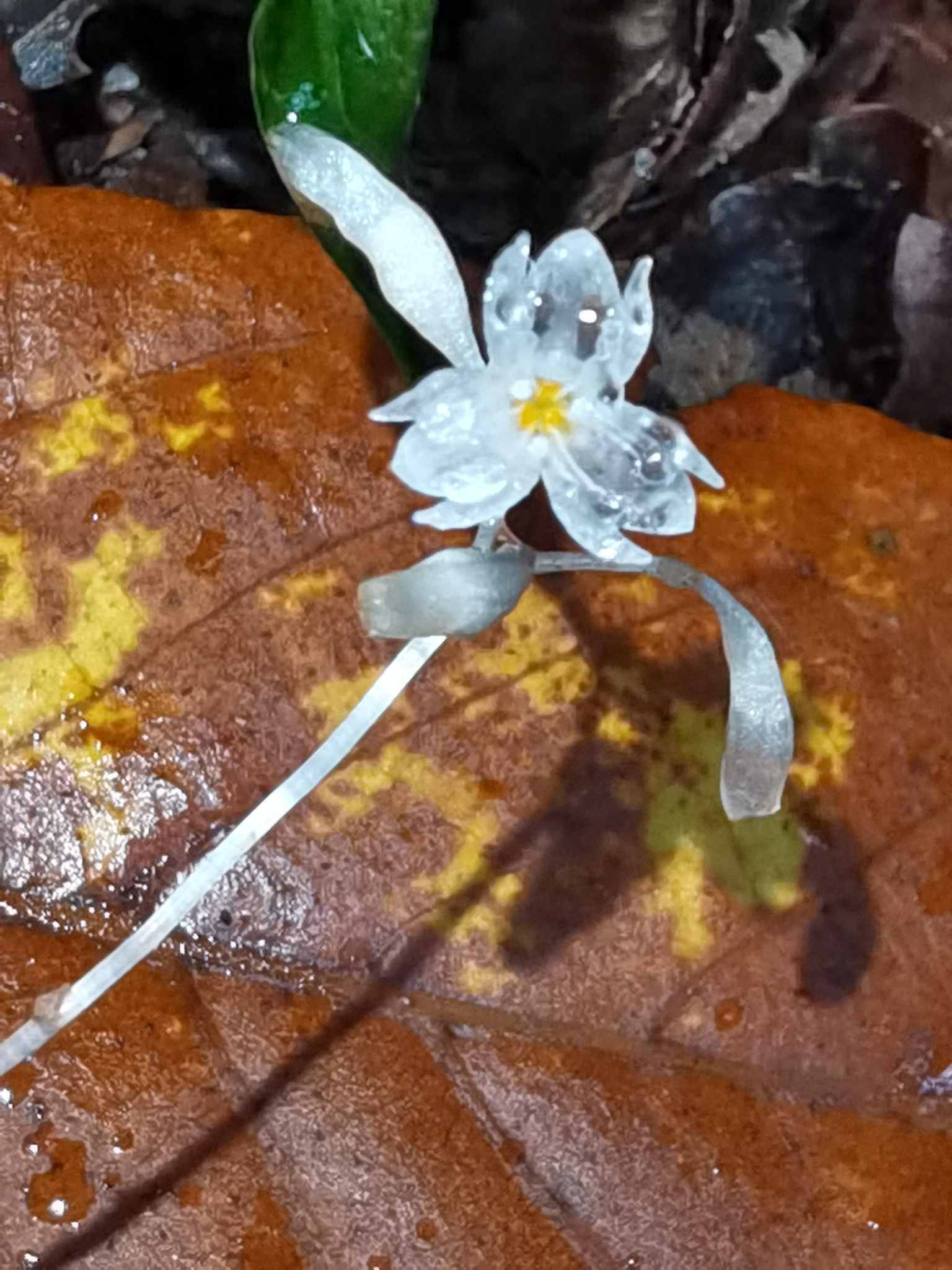

Conservation status
- Least Concern (IUCN 3.1)

Scientific classification
- Kingdom: Plantae
- Clade: Tracheophytes
- Clade: Angiosperms
- Clade: Monocots
- Order: Dioscoreales
- Family: Burmanniaceae
- Genus: Gymnosiphon
- Species: G. suaveolens

Binomial name
- Gymnosiphon suaveolens (H.Karst.) Urb.

Synonyms
- Benitzia suaveolens H.Karst.; Ptychomeria suaveolens (H.Karst.) Schltr.

= Gymnosiphon suaveolens =

Species of flowering plant

Gymnosiphon suaveolens is a flowering plant in the family Burmanniaceae. It can be found from Mexico to Ecuador and Venezuela. It mostly grows in tropical rainforests and lives parasitically on fungus to survive. It can remain underground for many years, emerging only when the conditions are right to flower and fruit.
