= Oxygyne shinzatoi =

Conservation status
- Critically Endangered (IUCN 3.1)

Scientific classification
- Kingdom: Plantae
- Clade: Tracheophytes
- Clade: Angiosperms
- Clade: Monocots
- Order: Dioscoreales
- Family: Burmanniaceae
- Genus: Oxygyne
- Species: O. shinzatoi

Binomial name
- Oxygyne shinzatoi (Hatus.) C.Abe & Akasawa

Species of flowering plant

Oxygyne shinzatoi is a flowering plant that is endemic to Okaniwa Island in the Ryukyu Islands, Japan. It blooms in September and October and is critically endangered due to logging.
