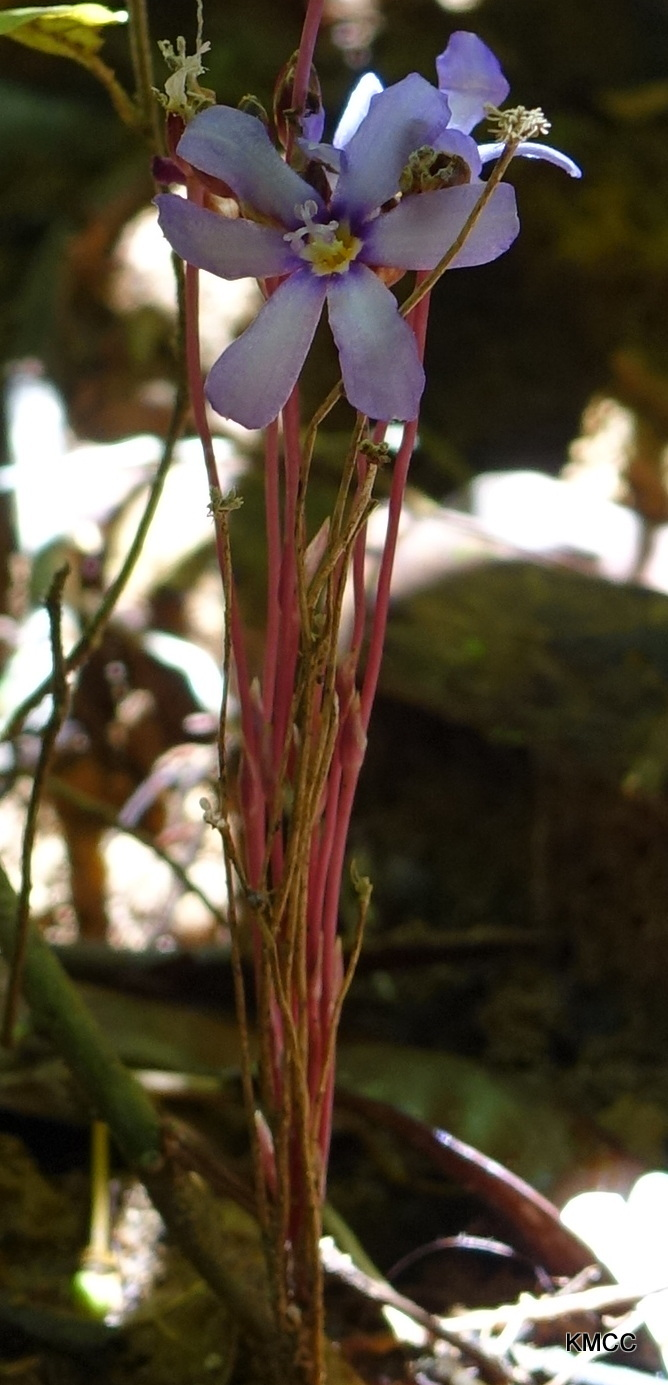

Scientific classification
- Kingdom: Plantae
- Clade: Tracheophytes
- Clade: Angiosperms
- Clade: Monocots
- Order: Asparagales
- Family: Iridaceae
- Genus: Geosiris
- Species: G. aphylla

Binomial name
- Geosiris aphylla Baill.

= Geosiris aphylla =

Species of flowering plant

Geosiris aphylla is a species in the flowering plant family Iridaceae, first described in 1894. It is endemic to Madagascar.

Geosiris aphylla is sometimes called the earth-iris. It is a small myco-heterotroph lacking chlorophyll and obtaining its nutrients from fungi in the soil.

== Description ==
Its rhizomes are slender and scaly, and stems are simple or branched. The leaves are alternate, but having no use, are reduced and scale-like (hence the epithet "aphylla," meaning "without leaves"). The flowers are light purple.

== Range and habitat ==
Geosiris aphylla is native to central and eastern Madagascar. It lives in forest humus in humid lowland and montane forests, between 400 and 1200 meters elevation.
