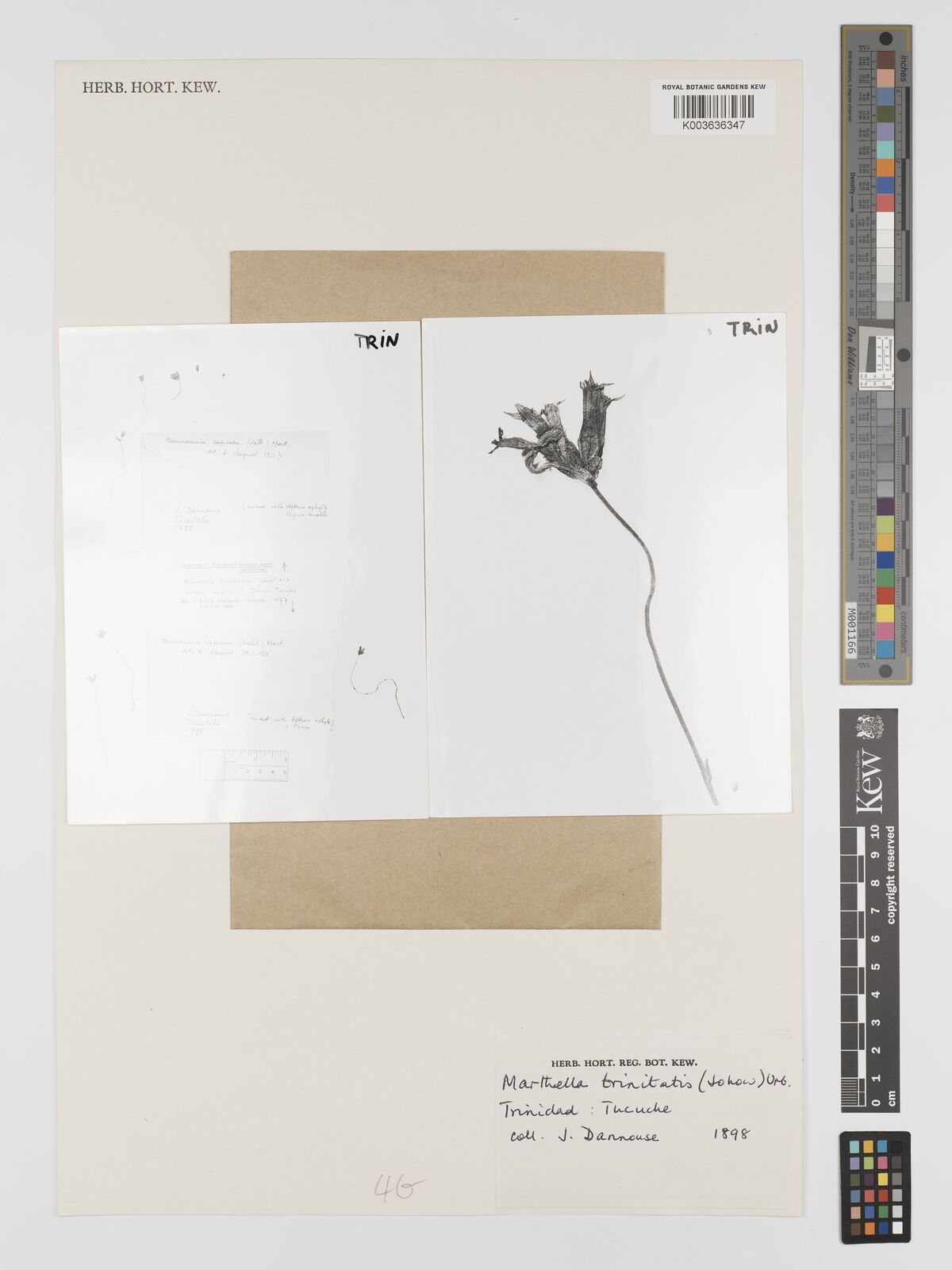

Scientific classification
- Kingdom: Plantae
- Clade: Tracheophytes
- Clade: Angiosperms
- Clade: Monocots
- Order: Dioscoreales
- Family: Burmanniaceae
- Genus: Marthella; Urb.
- Species: M. trinitatis

Binomial name
- Marthella trinitatis (Johow) Urb.

Synonyms
- Gymnosiphon trinitatis Johow

= Marthella =

Genus of flowering plants

Marthella is a genus of flowering plants in the Burmanniaceae, first described as a genus in 1903. It contains only one known species, Marthella trinitatis, endemic to the Island of Trinidad. It is considered critically endangered and only naturally appears in Northern Range Forest Reserve Section B. As a conservation measure, it is being cared for in the Heights of Aripo Village as a form of ex situ conservation.
