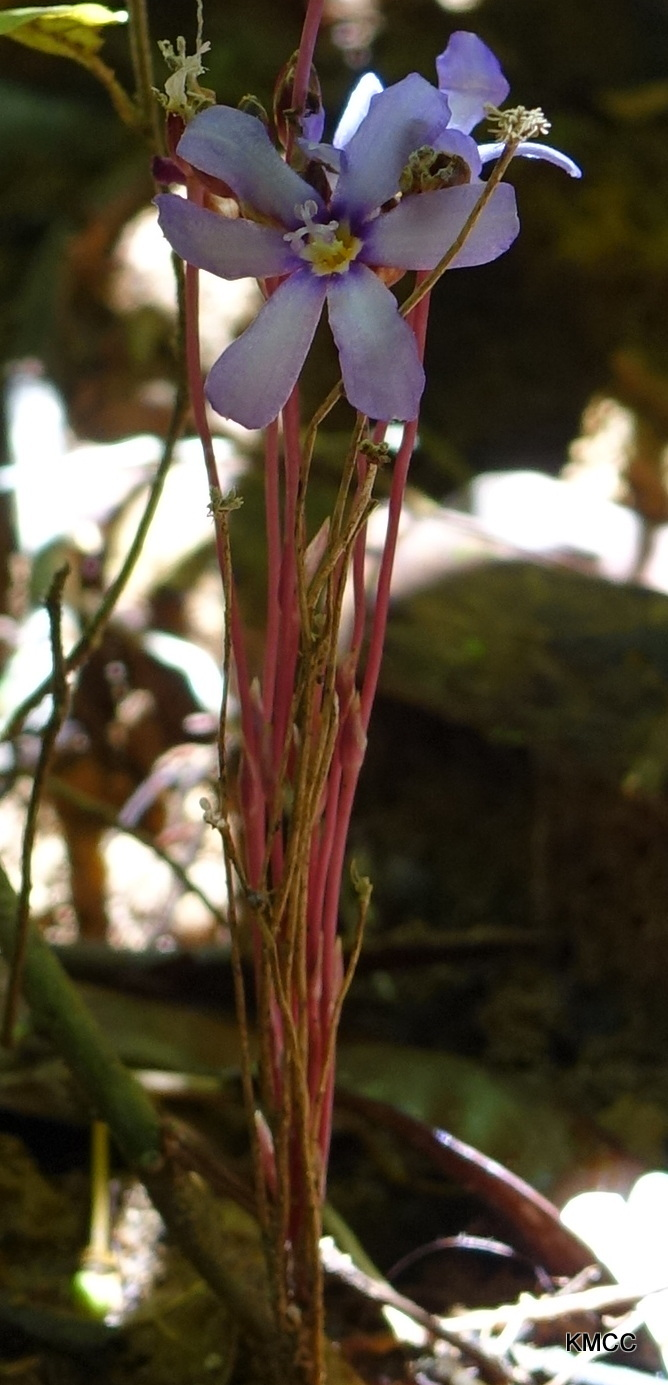
- Geosiris aphylla

Scientific classification
- Kingdom: Plantae
- Clade: Tracheophytes
- Clade: Angiosperms
- Clade: Monocots
- Order: Asparagales
- Family: Iridaceae
- Subfamily: Geosiridoideae; Golblatt & J.C.Manning
- Genus: Geosiris; Baill.

Type species
- Geosiris aphylla Baill.

Species
- Geosiris aphylla Geosiris albiflora Geosiris australiensis

= Geosiris =

Genus of flowering plants

Geosiris is a genus in the flowering plant family Iridaceae, first described in 1894. It was thought for many years to contain only one species, Geosiris aphylla, endemic to Madagascar. But then in 2010, a second species was described, Geosiris albiflora, from Mayotte Island in the Indian Ocean northwest of Madagascar. In 2017, a third species was found in Queensland, Australia, Geosiris australiensis.

Geosiris aphylla is sometimes called the "earth-iris." It is a small myco-heterotroph lacking chlorophyll and obtaining its nutrients from fungi in the soil. The genus name is derived from the Greek words geos, meaning "earth", and iris, referring to the Iris family of plants.

Its rhizomes are slender and scaly, and stems are simple or branched. The leaves are alternate, but having no use, are reduced and scale-like. The flowers are light purple.

In 1939, F. P. Jonker assigned Geosiris to its own family Geosiridaceae in Orchidales, and this was adopted in the Cronquist system, with a note that the family was closely related to Iridaceae or Burmanniaceae. The Angiosperm Phylogeny Group has since subsumed the family into Iridaceae; it is currently placed in the monotypic subfamily Geosiridoideae.
