= Geosiris albiflora =

Scientific classification
- Kingdom: Plantae
- Clade: Tracheophytes
- Clade: Angiosperms
- Clade: Monocots
- Order: Asparagales
- Family: Iridaceae
- Genus: Geosiris
- Species: G. albiflora

Binomial name
- Geosiris albiflora Goldblatt & J.C.Manning

Species of flowering plant

Geosiris albiflora is a species in the flowering plant family Iridaceae. Peter Goldlatt and John Manning first described it in 2010. It is endemic to Comoros.
