= Geosiris australiensis =

Scientific classification
- Kingdom: Plantae
- Clade: Tracheophytes
- Clade: Angiosperms
- Clade: Monocots
- Order: Asparagales
- Family: Iridaceae
- Genus: Geosiris
- Species: G. australiensis

Binomial name
- Geosiris australiensis B.Gray, Yee Wen Low

Species of flowering plant

Geosiris australiensis is a species in the flowering plant family Iridaceae, first described in 2017. It is native in Australia.
