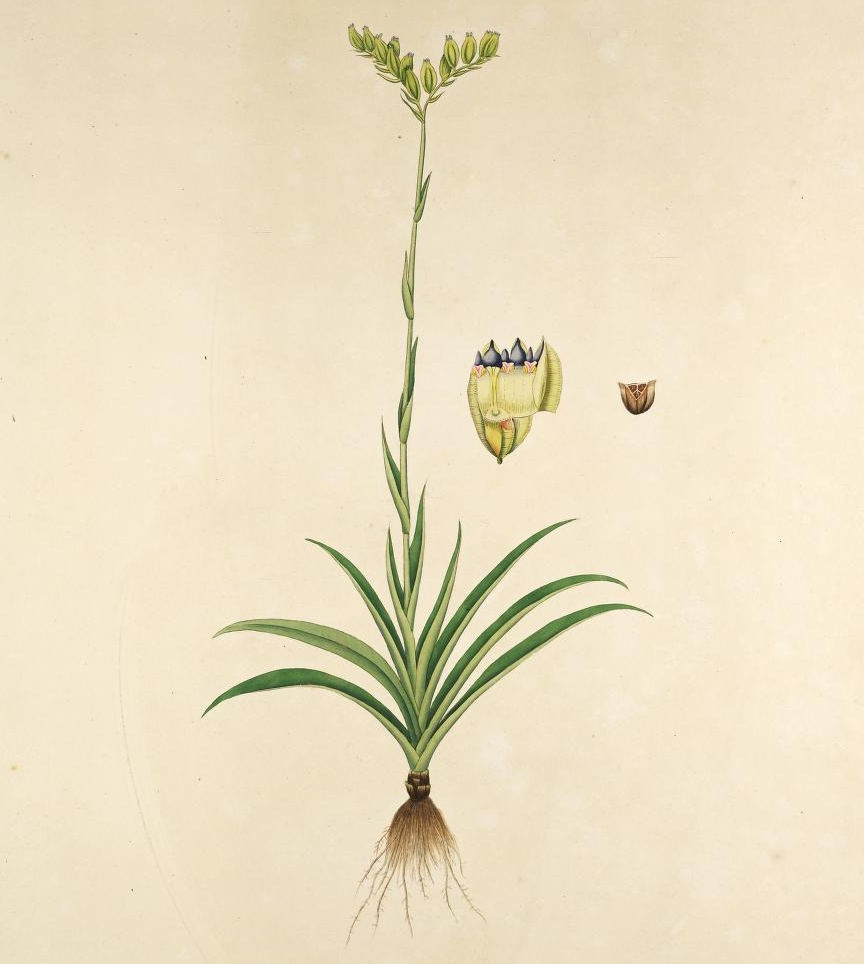
- Burmannia disticha

Scientific classification
- Kingdom: Plantae
- Clade: Tracheophytes
- Clade: Angiosperms
- Clade: Monocots
- Order: Dioscoreales
- Family: Burmanniaceae
- Genus: Burmannia; L.

Type species
- Burmannia disticha

Species
- See text.

Synonyms
- Vogelia J.F.Gmel.; Tripterella Michx.; Maburnia Thouars (Note: Maburnia is an imperfect taxonomic anagram of Burmannia.); Gonianthes Blume 1823 not A. Rich. 1850; Gonyanthes Nees; Tetraptera Miers; Tripteranthus Wall. ex Miers; Cryptonema Turcz.; Nephrocoelium Turcz.

= Burmannia (plant) =

Genus of flowering plants in the family Burmanniaceae

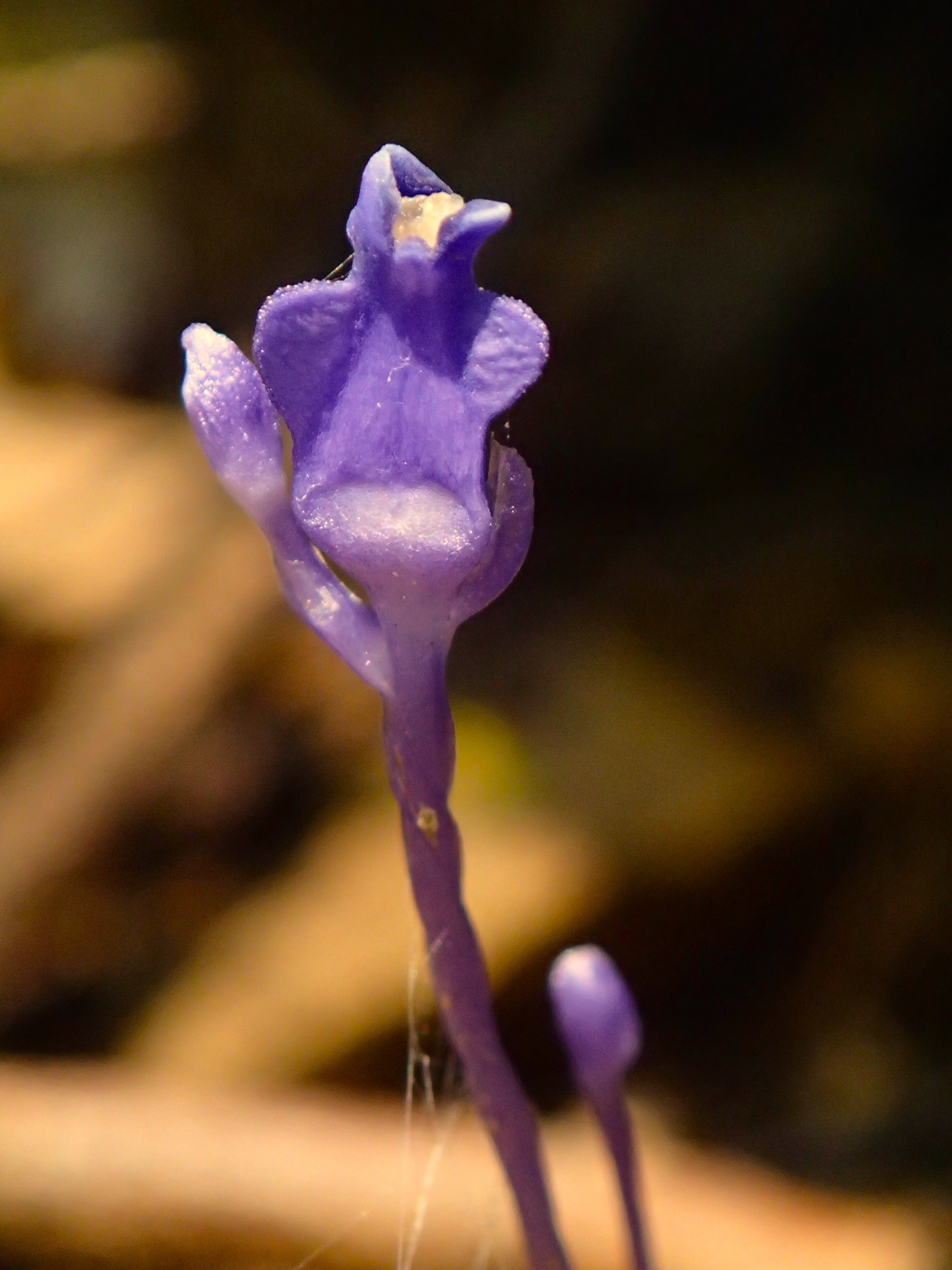
Burmannia itoana‐Amami Is., Japan.

Burmannia is a genus of flowering plants long thought of as related to orchids, although more recent studies suggest closer affinities with either the Dioscoreales or the Melanthiales. The plants are herbs, partially autotrophic (photosynthetic) but also partially parasitic on soil fungi.

Burmannia is native to tropical and subtropical parts of Africa, eastern Asia, Australia, and the Western Hemisphere. Three are regarded as native to the US:

The name Burmannia is a taxonomic patronym honoring the Dutch botanist Johannes Burman (1706 - 1779).

== Systematics ==
Burmannia comprises the following species.

- Burmannia alba - Brazil, Paraguay
- Burmannia aprica - S Brazil
- Burmannia australis - Brazil, Paraguay, Bolivia
- Burmannia bengkuluensis - Sumatra
- Burmannia bicolor - Cuba, N South America
- Burmannia bifaria - Java
- Burmannia biflora - Virginia to Texas; Cuba
- Burmannia candelabrum - India, Assam, Bangladesh
- Burmannia candida - Thailand, Myanmar, Sumatra
- Burmannia capitata - North Carolina to Texas, West Indies, S Mexico, C + S America
- Burmannia championii - S + E + SE Asia, New Guinea
- Burmannia chinensis - E India, Indochina, China, Ryukyu Is
- Burmannia cochinchinensis - Vietnam
- Burmannia coelestis - S + E + SE Asia, New Guinea, N Australia, Micronesia
- Burmannia compacta - S Venezuela
- Burmannia connata - Sumatra
- Burmannia cryptopetala - E Asia
- Burmannia damazii - C + SE Brazil
- Burmannia dasyantha - Colombia, Venezuela
- Burmannia disticha - S + E + SE Asia, New Guinea, N Australia
- Burmannia engganensis - Enggano I in W Indonesia
- Burmannia filamentosa - Guangdong in China
- Burmannia flava - S Florida, Chiapas, Cuba, C + S America
- Burmannia foliosa - S Venezuela
- Burmannia geelvinkiana - W New Guinea
- Burmannia gracilis - S Thailand, W Malaysia
- Burmannia grandiflora - Colombia, C Brazil
- Burmannia hexaptera - Cameroon, Gabon
- Burmannia indica - S India
- Burmannia itoana - China, Japan, Vietnam, Taiwan
- Burmannia jonkeri - Mato Grosso, Goiás
- Burmannia juncea - N Australia
- Burmannia kalbreyeri - C America, NW S America
- Burmannia larseniana - Thailand
- Burmannia latialata - tropical Africa
- Burmannia ledermannii - New Guinea, Palau
- Burmannia luteoalba - Phu-quoc I. in Cambodia; Vietnam
- Burmannia lutescens - Malaysia, Indonesia, Papuasia
- Burmannia madagascariensis - Madagascar, Mauritius, C + S Africa
- Burmannia malasica - S Thailand, SE Kalimantan
- Burmannia micropetala - New Guinea
- Burmannia nepalensis - Himalayas, E + SE Asia
- Burmannia oblonga - Hainan, Indochina, N Sumatra
- Burmannia polygaloides - S. Venezuela, NW Brazil
- Burmannia pusilla - India, Sri Lanka, Vietnam, Cambodia
- Burmannia sanariapoana - S Venezuela
- Burmannia sphagnoides - W Malaysia, Sumatra, W Borneo
- Burmannia steenisii - Java
- Burmannia stricta - S India
- Burmannia stuebelii - N Peru
- Burmannia subcoelestis - Cambodia, Laos, Vietnam
- Burmannia tenella - N + C South America
- Burmannia tenera - Goiás, São Paulo
- Burmannia tisserantii - Central African Rep
- Burmannia vaupesiana - Colombia
- Burmannia wallichii - China, India, Indochina
