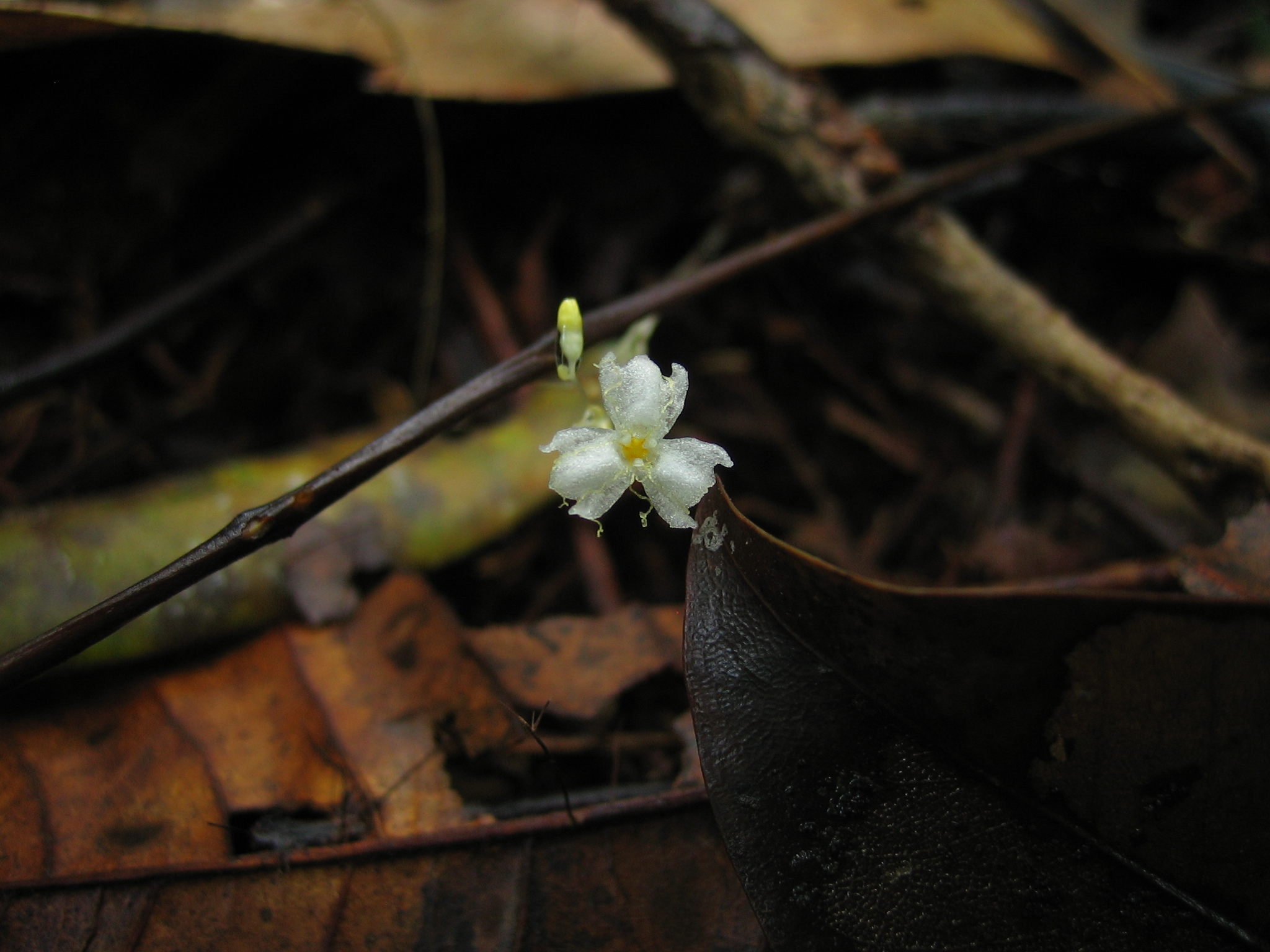
- Gymnosiphon longistylus

Scientific classification
- Kingdom: Plantae
- Clade: Tracheophytes
- Clade: Angiosperms
- Clade: Monocots
- Order: Dioscoreales
- Family: Burmanniaceae
- Genus: Gymnosiphon; Blume

Synonyms
- Benitzia H.Karst.; Cymbocarpa Miers; Desmogymnosiphon Guinea; Ptychomeria Benth.

= Gymnosiphon =

Genus of flowering plants

Gymnosiphon (yellowseed) is a genus of monocotyledonous flowering plants from the yam order, Dioscoreales. Like most of the other members of the family in which the plant is placed (Burmanniaceae), Gymnosiphon is entirely myco-heterotrophic genus that does not contain chlorophyll and respectively does not perform photosynthesis.

Gymnosiphon is distributed across the moist, tropical regions of Asia, America and Africa. The plant has very small size and thin stems. Leaves are rudimentary and with appearance like scales or bracts. Its flowers are white in color, pale and solitary or sometimes collected in tiny inflorescences of few depending on the species. They are also actinomorphic with three larger outer tepals and three more inner and smaller ones.

Phylogenetically Gymnosiphon is placed in the clade of Burmanniaceae sensu stricto.

== Species ==
38 species are accepted.

- Gymnosiphon affinis J.J.Sm. – New Guinea
- Gymnosiphon afro-orientalis Cheek – SC Africa
- Gymnosiphon aphyllus Blume – Taiwan, southeast Asia, New Guinea, Micronesia
- Gymnosiphon bekensis Letouzey – central Africa
- Gymnosiphon brachycephalus Snelders & Maas – Panama and northwestern South America
- Gymnosiphon breviflorus Gleason – Costa Rica, Panama, N South America
- Gymnosiphon capitatus (Benth.) Urb. – Guyana and northwestern Brazil
- Gymnosiphon constrictus Maas & H.Maas – Gabon
- Gymnosiphon cymosus (Benth.) Benth. & Hook.f. – northern South America
- Gymnosiphon danguyanus H.Perrier – Tanzania, Madagascar
- Gymnosiphon divaricatus (Benth.) Benth. & Hook.f. – southern Mexico, Trinidad, central and south America
- Gymnosiphon fimbriatus (Benth.) Urb. – South America
- Gymnosiphon fonensis Cheek – Guinea
- Gymnosiphon guianensis Gleason – Guyana, Suriname
- Gymnosiphon longistylus (Benth.) Hutch. – C + W Africa
- Gymnosiphon marieae Cheek – Madagascar
- Gymnosiphon minahassae Schltr. – Sulawesi
- Gymnosiphon minutus Snelders & Maas – Costa Rica, N South America
- Gymnosiphon neglectus Jonker – Java
- Gymnosiphon niveus (Griseb.) Urb. – West Indies
- Gymnosiphon okamotoi Tuyama – Palau in Micronesia
- Gymnosiphon oliganthus Schltr. – northeastern Papua New Guinea
- Gymnosiphon panamensis Jonker – from Veracruz to Panama
- Gymnosiphon papuanus Becc. – New Guinea, Sulawesi, Palau
- Gymnosiphon pauciflorus Schltr. – New Guinea
- Gymnosiphon philippinensis Pelser, Salares & Barcelona – Philippines
- Gymnosiphon queenslandicus B.Gray & Y.W.Low – Queensland
- Gymnosiphon recurvatus Snelders & Maas – Guyana
- Gymnosiphon refractus (Miers) Benth. & Hook.f. – southeastern and southern Brazil
- Gymnosiphon saccatum (Sandwith) V.Merckx & Byng – Guyana, northern Brazil, and Peru
- Gymnosiphon samoritoureanus Cheek – Guinea and Liberia
- Gymnosiphon sphaerocarpus Urb. – Pernambuco, West Indies
- Gymnosiphon suaveolens (H.Karst.) Urb. – Mexico, C + S America
- Gymnosiphon tenellus (Benth.) Urb. – Jamaica, C America, NW S America
- Gymnosiphon urbani (Goebel & Suess.) V.Merckx & Byng – Costa Rica to Venezuela and Peru, Greater Antilles
- Gymnosiphon usambaricus Engl. – Kenya, Tanzania
