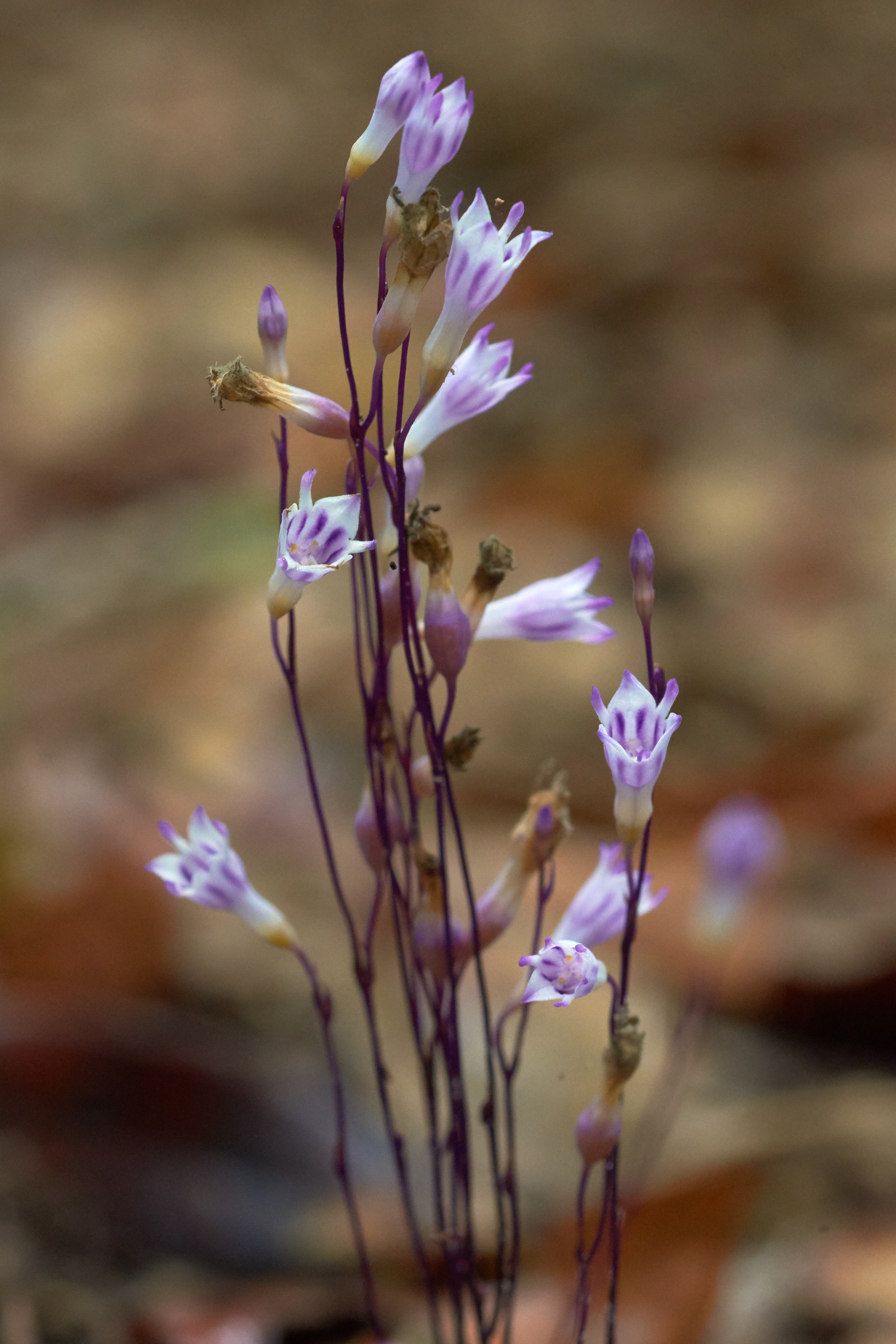

Scientific classification
- Kingdom: Plantae
- Clade: Tracheophytes
- Clade: Angiosperms
- Clade: Monocots
- Order: Dioscoreales
- Family: Burmanniaceae
- Genus: Apteria; Urb.
- Species: A. aphylla

Binomial name
- Apteria aphylla (Nutt.) Barnhart ex Small

Synonyms
- Lobelia aphylla Nutt.; Apteria setacea Nutt.; Nemitis setacea (Nutt.) Raf.; Stemoptera lilacina Miers; Apteria hymenanthera Miq.; Monostychosepalum monanthum Barb.Rodr.; Apteria ulei Schltr.; Apteria boliviana Rusby; Apteria gentianoides Jonker

= Apteria =

Genus of flowering plants

Apteria is a genus of flowering plants in the Burmanniaceae, first described as a genus in 1834. It contains only one known species, Apteria aphylla, the nodding-nixie, native to the southern United States (E Texas to S Georgia and Florida), Mexico, Central America, the West Indies, and South America.

== Description ==
The nodding-nixie is an herb and a perennial flower which blooms during September to November. The flowers that bloom are either purple or white, either fully purple or white with purple marks. These flowers can grow to about 10 inches (250 mm) in height. The fruit of this plant is a capsule.
