= Miersiella (crab) =

Scientific classification
- Domain: Eukaryota
- Kingdom: Animalia
- Phylum: Arthropoda
- Class: Malacostraca
- Order: Decapoda
- Suborder: Pleocyemata
- Infraorder: Brachyura
- Family: Xanthidae
- Subfamily: Euxanthinae
- Genus: Miersiella; Guinot, 1967

Genus of crabs

Miersiella is a genus of crabs in the family Xanthidae, containing the following species:

- Miersiella cavifrons Takeda, 1989
- Miersiella haswelli (Miers, 1886)
