= Hexapterella =

Scientific classification
- Kingdom: Plantae
- Clade: Tracheophytes
- Clade: Angiosperms
- Clade: Monocots
- Order: Dioscoreales
- Family: Burmanniaceae
- Genus: Hexapterella; Urb.

Type species
- Hexapterella gentianoides Urb.

Genus of flowering plants

Hexapterella is a genus of flowering plants in the Burmanniaceae, first described as a genus in 1903. It is native to northern South America and to the Island of Trinidad.

== Species ==
- Hexapterella gentianoides Urb. - NW Brazil, the Guianas, Venezuela, Colombia, Trinidad
- Hexapterella steyermarkii Maas & H.Maas - Cerro Aracamuni in S Venezuela
