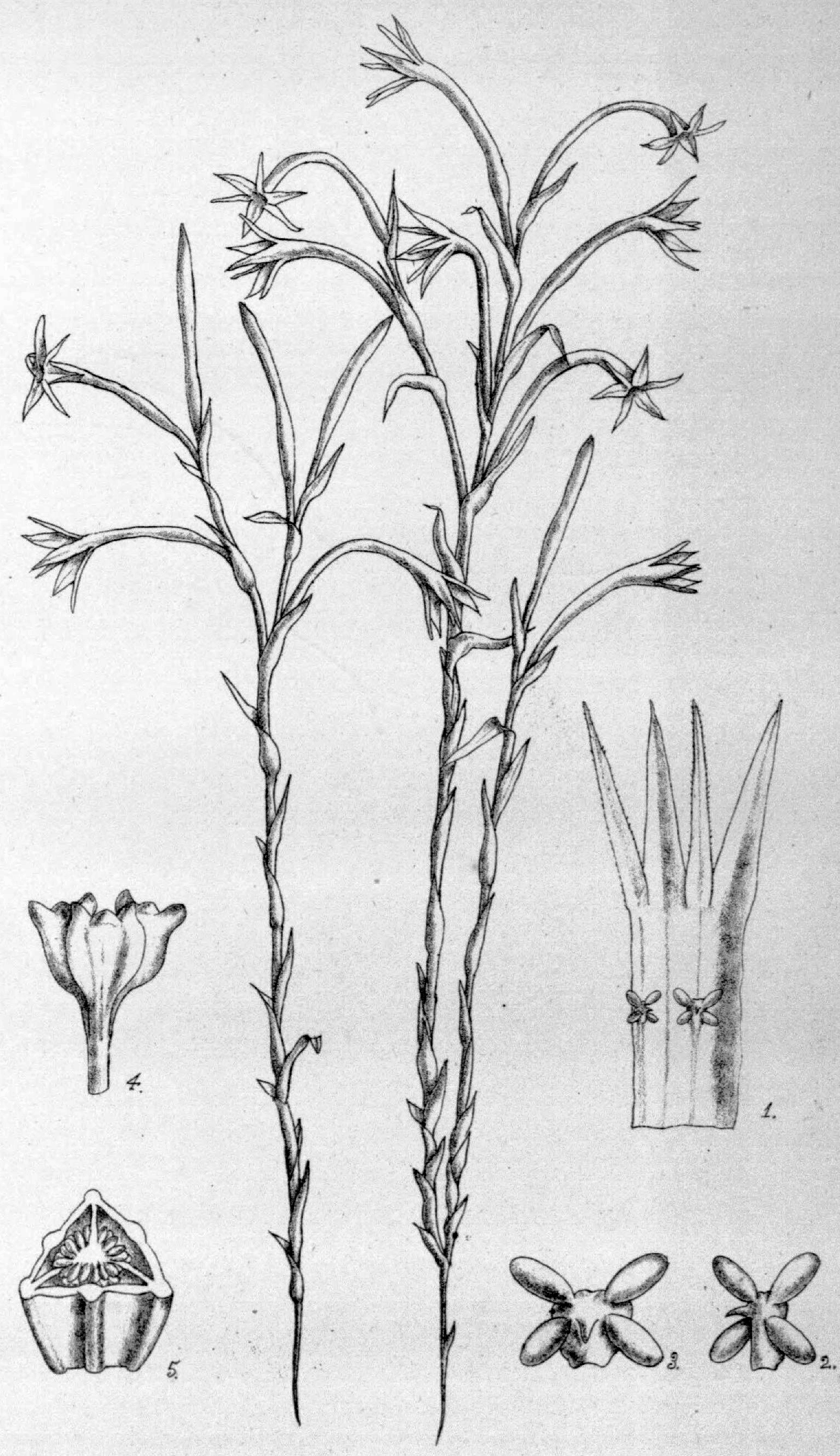
- Campylosiphon purpurascens

Scientific classification
- Kingdom: Plantae
- Clade: Tracheophytes
- Clade: Angiosperms
- Clade: Monocots
- Order: Dioscoreales
- Family: Burmanniaceae
- Genus: Campylosiphon; Benth.

Type species
- Campylosiphon purpurascens Benth.

Synonyms
- Dipterosiphon Huber

= Campylosiphon =

Genus of flowering plants

Campylosiphon is a genus of flowering plants in the Burmanniaceae, first described as a genus in 1882. It is native to tropical western and central Africa, as well as northern South America.

Species

- Campylosiphon congestus (C.H.Wright) Maas - Liberia, Ghana, Nigeria, Cameroon, Gabon, Central African Republic, Zaire, Angola
- Campylosiphon purpurascens Benth. - Brazil, Colombia, Venezuela, Guyana, Suriname, French Guiana
