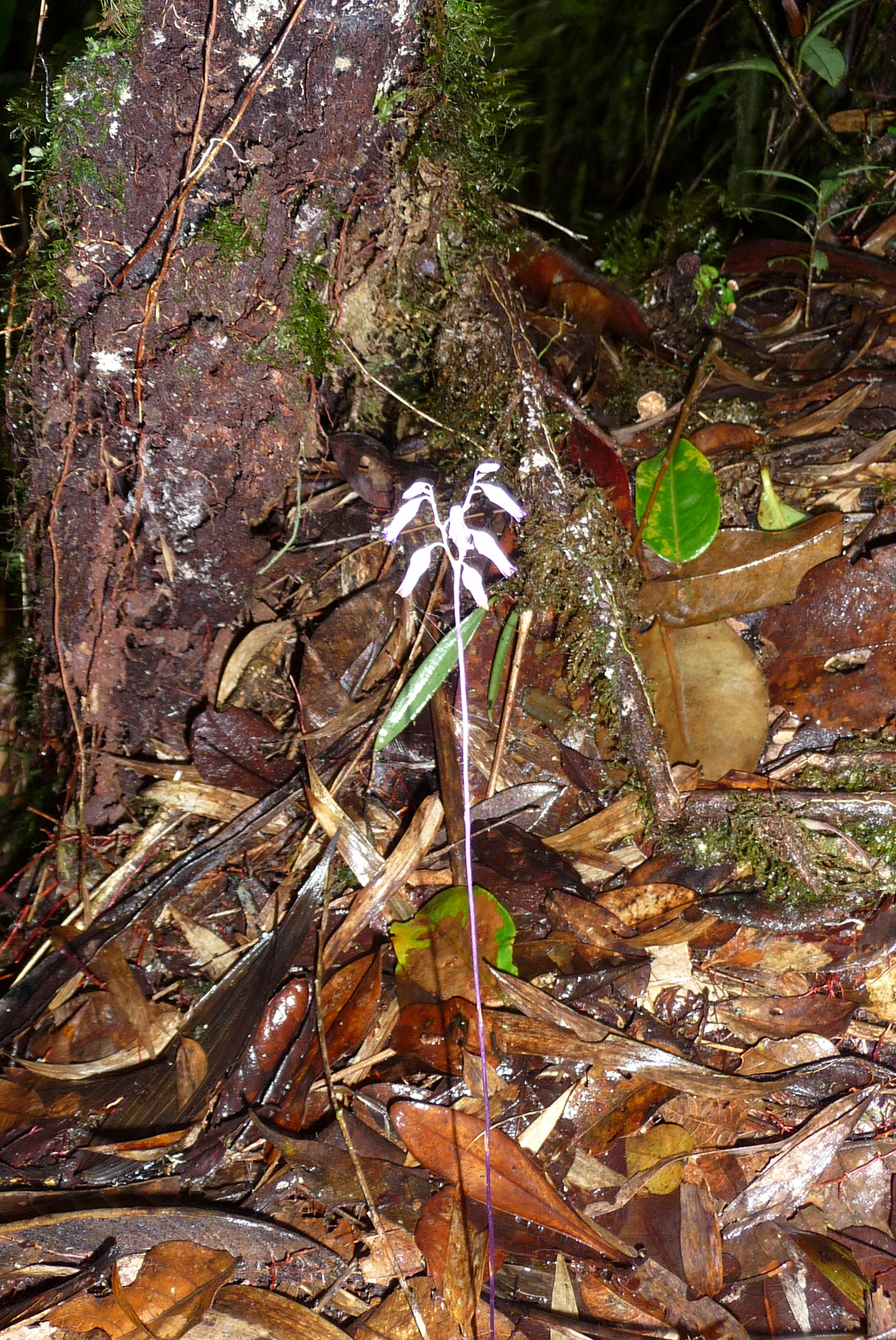
- Dictyostega orobanchoides

Scientific classification
- Kingdom: Plantae
- Clade: Tracheophytes
- Clade: Angiosperms
- Clade: Monocots
- Order: Dioscoreales
- Family: Burmanniaceae
- Genus: Dictyostega; Miers
- Species: D. orobanchoides

Binomial name
- Dictyostega orobanchoides (Hook.) Miers

Synonyms
- Apteria orobanchoides Hook.

= Dictyostega =

Genus of flowering plants

Dictyostega is a genus of flowering plants in the family Burmanniaceae, first described as a genus in 1840. It contains only one known species, Dictyostega orobanchoides, native to southern Mexico (Veracruz, Chiapas, Oaxaca), Central America, Trinidad, and South America (Brazil, French Guiana, Suriname, Guyana, Venezuela, Colombia, Peru, Bolivia)).

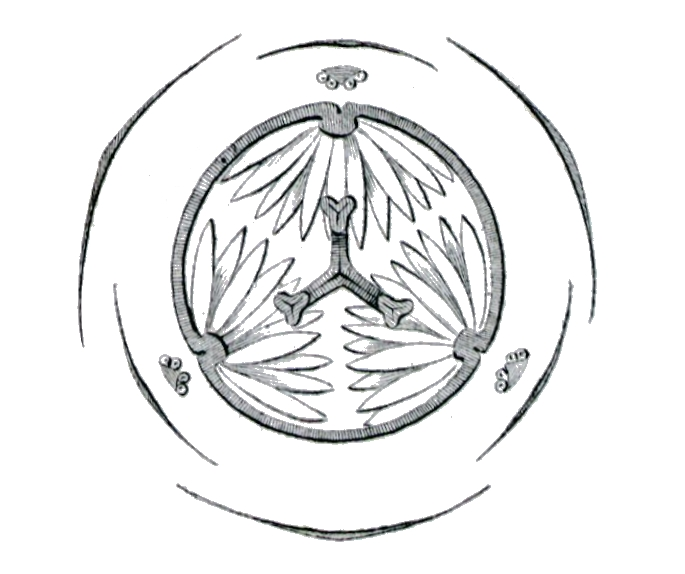
Diagram of Dictyostega flower

Subspecies

- Dictyostega orobanchoides subsp. orobanchoides - most of species range
- Dictyostega orobanchoides subsp. parviflora (Benth.) Snelders & Maas - Panama, Trinidad, South America
- Dictyostega orobanchoides subsp. purdieana (Benth.) Snelders & Maas - Panama, Venezuela, Colombia, Ecuador, Peru
