= Miersiella umbellata =

Scientific classification
- Kingdom: Plantae
- Clade: Tracheophytes
- Clade: Angiosperms
- Clade: Monocots
- Order: Dioscoreales
- Family: Burmanniaceae
- Genus: Miersiella; Urb.
- Species: M. umbellata

Binomial name
- Miersiella umbellata (Miers) Urb.

Synonyms
- Homotypic Synonyms: Dictyostega umbellata Miers; Heterotypic Synonyms: Dictyostega costata Miers; Miersiella aristata Sandwith; Miersiella costata (Miers) Sandwith; Miersiella kuhlmannii Brade

Species of flowering plant

Miersiella is a monotypic genus of flowering plants in the Burmanniaceae, first described as a genus in 1903. It contains only one known species, Miersiella umbellata Urb. It is native to South America (in the countries of Brazil, French Guiana, Suriname, Guyana, Venezuela, Colombia, Peru).

The genus name of Miersiella is in honour of John Miers (1789–1879), a British botanist and engineer, best known for his work on the flora of Chile and Argentina. The Latin specific epithet of umbellata is derived from umbella meaning umbelled, referring to the flower. Both the genus and the species were first described and published in Symb. Antill. Vol.3 on page 439 in 1903.
