= Cryptothallus =

Formerly recognized genus of liverworts

Cryptothallus is a previously recognized genus of liverworts in the family Aneuraceae. The plants are small, and are white to pale green as a result of lacking chlorophyll. This feature led to the creation of a separate genus. The morphology of species assigned to Cryptothallus is very similar to that of Aneura. As a result, Karen Renzaglia in 1982 suggested that the only species then placed in the genus, Cryptothallus mirabilis, may be considered "merely as an achlorophyllous species of Aneura." Wickett and Goffinet argued the same position on the basis of sequences of nuclear, mitochondrial, and plastid DNA, and moved Cryptothallus mirabilis to Aneura. A 2010 molecular phylogenetic study confirmed the position of Cryptothallus within Aneura. This was accepted in the 2016 world checklist of hornworts and liverworts.

== Species ==
Two species were formerly placed in the genus.

- Cryptothallus mirabilis Malmb., now a synonym of Aneura mirabilis (Malmb.) Wickett & Goffinet
- Cryptothallus hirsutus H.A.Crum, now a synonym of Aneura crumii L.Söderstr.
