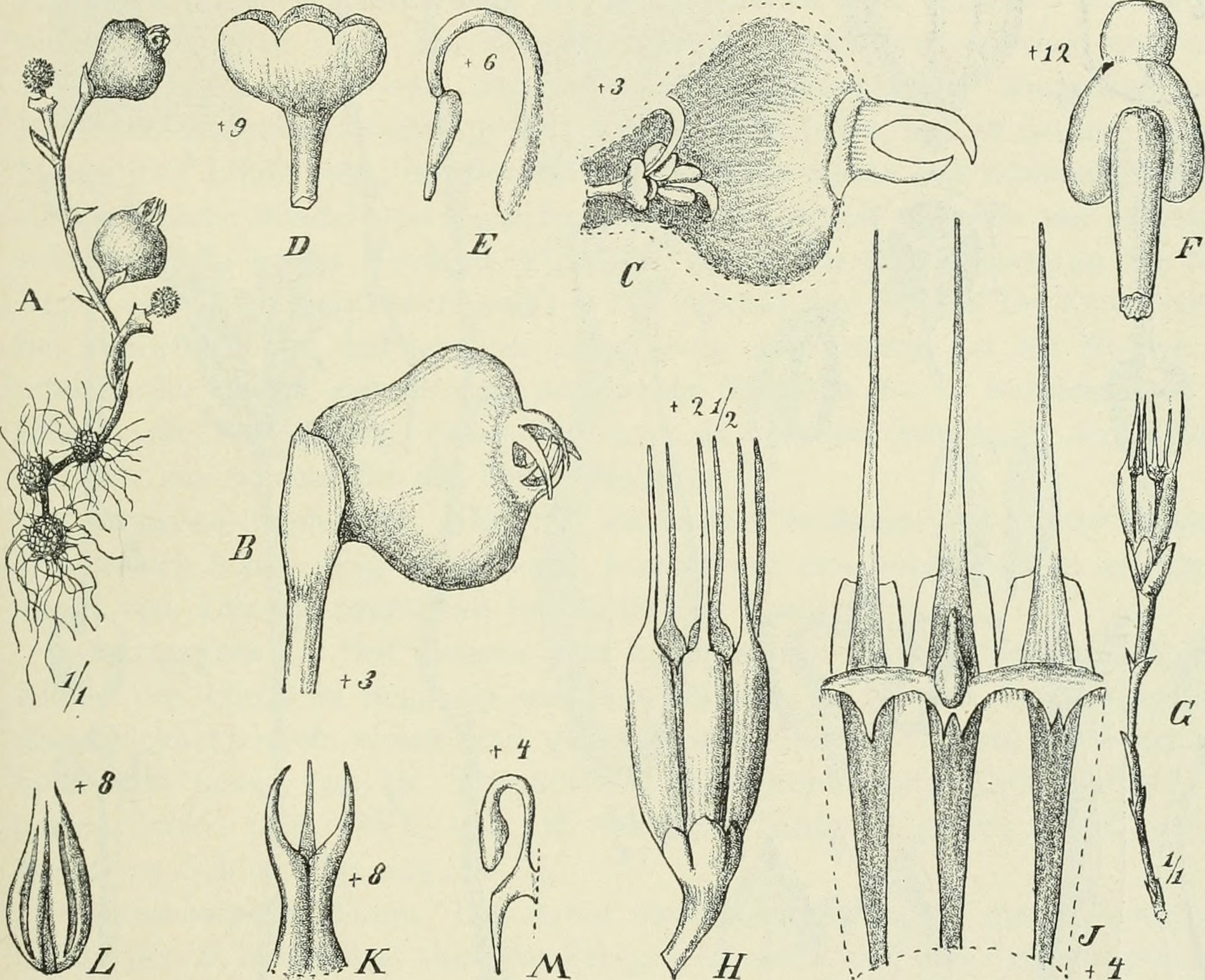
- Oxygyne triandra (G-M)

Scientific classification
- Kingdom: Plantae
- Clade: Tracheophytes
- Clade: Angiosperms
- Clade: Monocots
- Order: Dioscoreales
- Family: Burmanniaceae
- Genus: Oxygyne; Schltr.

Type species
- Oxygyne triandra Schltr.

Species
- O. confusa E.Bidault, V.Merckx & Byng; O. duncanii Cheek; O. hyodoi C.Abe & Akasawa; O. shinzatoi (Hatus.) Tsukaya; O. triandra Schltr.; O. yamashitae Yahara & Tsukaya

Synonyms
- Saionia Hatus.

= Oxygyne =

Genus of flowering plants

Oxygyne is a genus of achlorophyllous mycoheterotrophic plants in the family Burmanniaceae. First described in 1906 by German botanist Rudolf Schlechter with Oxygyne triandra as the type species, six species are currently recognised. The genus has a highly disjunct distribution, with three species known from Japan and three from West-Central Africa, with each species known only from a single location.

== Species ==
This genus includes the following species:

- Oxygyne confusa E.Bidault, V.Merckx & Byng – Central African Republic
- Oxygyne duncanii Cheek – Cameroon
- Oxygyne hyodoi C.Abe & Akasawa Shikoku, Japan
- Oxygyne shinzatoi (Hatus.) Tsukaya – Okinawa Island, Japan
- Oxygyne triandra Schltr. (type species) – Cameroon
- Oxygyne yamashitae Yahara & Tsukaya – Yakushima, Japan
