= Haplothismia =

Scientific classification
- Kingdom: Plantae
- Clade: Tracheophytes
- Clade: Angiosperms
- Clade: Monocots
- Order: Dioscoreales
- Family: Burmanniaceae
- Genus: Haplothismia; Airy Shaw
- Species: H. exannulata

Binomial name
- Haplothismia exannulata Airy Shaw

Genus of flowering plants

Haplothismia is a genus of myco-heterotrophic plants in family Burmanniaceae, first described as a genus in 1952. There is only one known species, Haplothismia exannulata, endemic to southern India (Kerala + Tamil Nadu). The plant is mycotrophic, i.e. lacking chlorophyll and obtaining sustenance from fungi in the soil.
