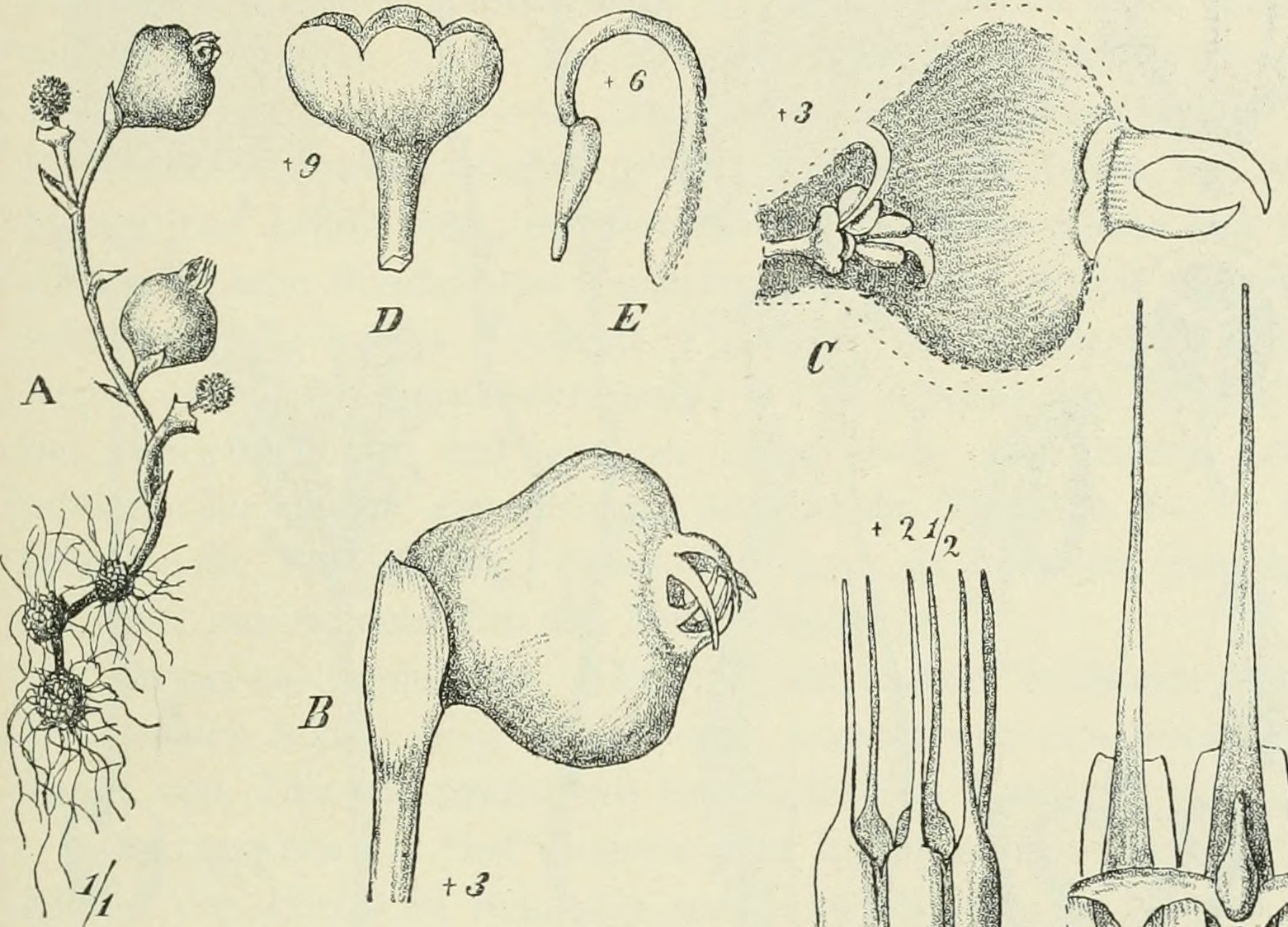
- Illustrations of Afrothismia pachyantha

Scientific classification
- Kingdom: Plantae
- Clade: Tracheophytes
- Clade: Angiosperms
- Clade: Monocots
- Order: Dioscoreales
- Family: Burmanniaceae
- Genus: Afrothismia; Schltr.

Type species
- Afrothismia winkleri (Engl.) Schltr.

Species
- See text

= Afrothismia =

Genus of flowering plants

Afrothismia is a genus of myco-heterotrophic plants in the family Burmanniaceae, first described as a genus in 1906. It is native to tropical Africa.

== Species ==
As of April 2025, Plants of the World Online accepts the following 17 species:

- Afrothismia amietii Cheek – Cameroon
- Afrothismia baerae Cheek – Kenya
- Afrothismia foertheriana T.Franke, Sainge & Agerer – Cameroon
- Afrothismia fungiformis Sainge & Kenfack
- Afrothismia gabonensis Dauby & Stévart – Gabon
- Afrothismia gesnerioides H.Maas – Cameroon
- Afrothismia hydra Sainge & T.Franke – Cameroon
- Afrothismia insignis Cowley – Tanzania
- Afrothismia korupensis Sainge & T.Franke – Cameroon
- Afrothismia kupensis Cheek & S.A.Williams
- Afrothismia mhoroana Cheek – Morogoro in Tanzania
- Afrothismia pachyantha Schltr. – Cameroon
- Afrothismia pusilla Sainge & Kenfack
- Afrothismia saingei T.Franke – Cameroon, Gabon
- Afrothismia ugandensis Cheek – Uganda
- Afrothismia winkleri (Engl.) Schltr. – Cameroon
- Afrothismia zambesiaca Cheek – Malawi
