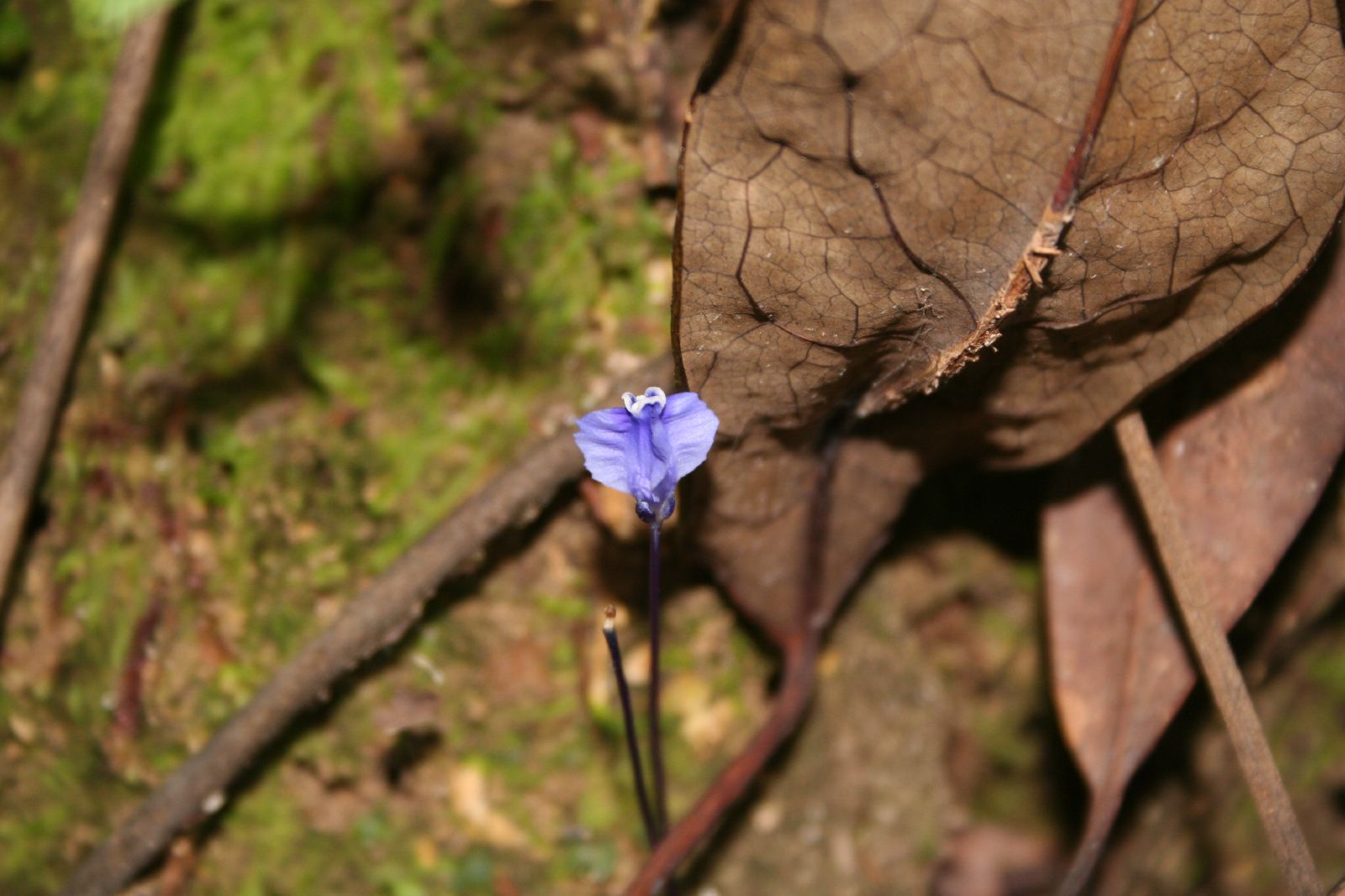

Scientific classification
- Kingdom: Plantae
- Clade: Embryophytes
- Clade: Tracheophytes
- Clade: Spermatophytes
- Clade: Angiosperms
- Clade: Monocots
- Order: Dioscoreales
- Family: Burmanniaceae; Blume

Genera
- See text
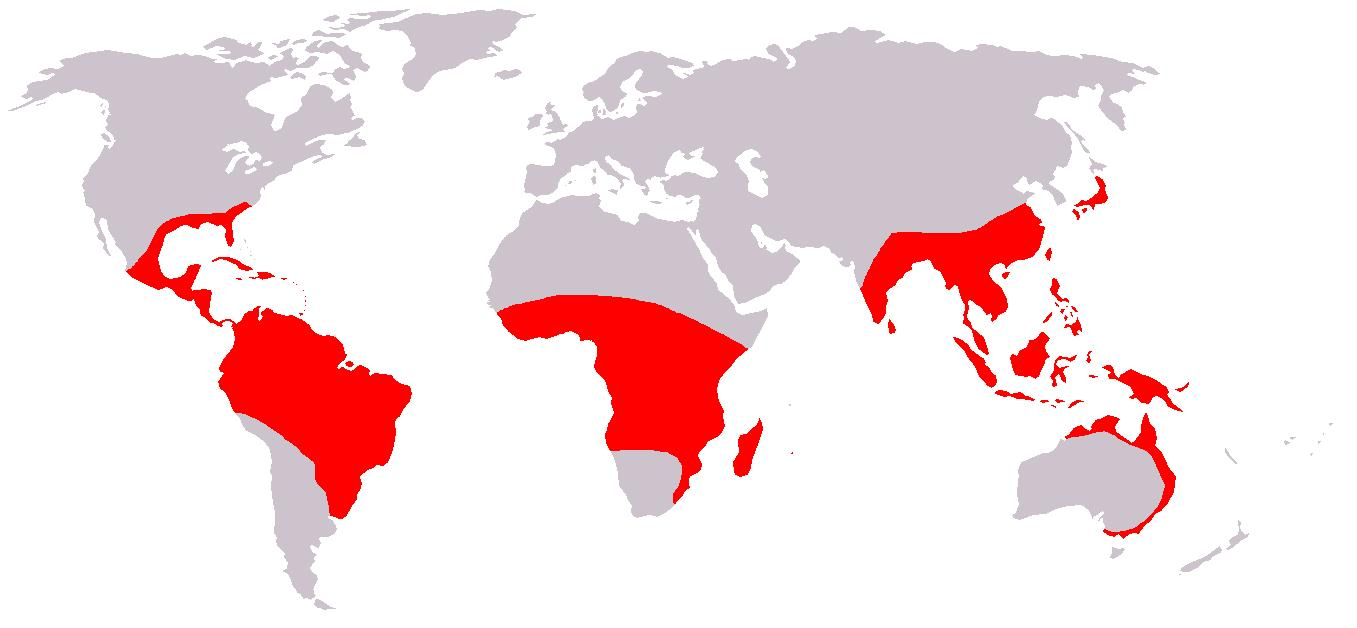
- Range of Burmanniaceae

Synonyms
- Burmanniae

= Burmanniaceae =

Burmanniaceae Temporal range: Late Cretaceous - Recent 85–0 Ma

Family of flowering plants

Burmanniaceae is a family of flowering plants, consisting of 99 species of herbaceous plants in eight genera.

== Description ==
These plants are annual or perennial herbs, with generally unbranched stems, some lacking leaves. Some members of this family lack chlorophyll and are mycotrophic (also called myco-heterotrophic).

The family tends to be saprophytic and even the autotrophic species are all endomycorrhizal and probably at least hemisaprophytic.

The family occurs worldwide, with a mostly tropic to subtropical distribution. A number of species are threatened.

== Taxonomy ==
John Lindley described the family as Burmanniae, with the single genus Burmannia, in 1830. In 1998 the APG I system placed Burmanniaceae as one of five families in the order Dioscoreales, within the monocot clade. The APG II system of 2003, as a result of an extensive study by Caddick and colleagues (2002), using an analysis of three genes, rbcL, atpB and 18S rDNA, in addition to morphological criteria, led to a considerable rearrangement of the families within Dioscoreales. In APG II the circumscription of the family was wider and included the plants that belonged to the family Thismiaceae in APG I. The result was an order with only three families. APG III (2009) left this arrangement unchanged.

Nevertheless, some ongoing research has challenged this relationship claiming that the older classification better reflects the evolutionary relationships between the genera. According to these researchers the constituent clades are as follows:

Burmanniaceae sensu stricto

- Apteria Nutt.
- Burmannia L.
- Campylosiphon Benth.
- Dictyostega Miers
- Gymnosiphon (synonym Cymbocarpa Miers
- Hexapterella Urb.
- Marthella Urb.
- Mierisella Urb.

Afrothismia clade

- Afrothismia Schltr.

Tribe Thismieae

- Haplothismia Airy Shaw
- Oxygyne Schltr.
- Thismia Griff
- Tiputinia P.E.Berry & C.L.Woodw.

But because of conflicting evidence, the APG IV (2016) authors felt it was still premature to propose a restructuring of the order since the most recent evidence upholds the APG configuration and the work of Caddick and colleagues.

=== Evolution ===
According to molecular analyses, the myco-heterotrophic type of life that these species lead evolved six (or even more) times independently in the three clades that are part of Burmanniaceae. Afrothismia and tribe Thismieae represent two of these shifts to myco-heterotrophy from autotrophy while Burmanniaceae sensu stricto are the clade where the other four took place. The family appears in the Late Cretaceous but the further diversification and shifts to the typical habit occurred later in the same period and continued after the K–T boundary in Paleogene.

== Bibliography ==
- Caddick, Lizabeth R.; Rudall, Paula J.; Wilkin, Paul; Hedderson, Terry A. J.; Chase, Mark W. (February 2002), "Phylogenetics of Dioscoreales based on combined analyses of morphological and molecular data", Botanical Journal of the Linnean Society, 138 (2): 123–144, doi:10.1046/j.1095-8339.2002.138002123.x
- Caddick, Lizabeth R.; Wilkin, Paul; Rudall, Paula J.; Hedderson, Terry A. J.; Chase, Mark W. (February 2002), "Yams Reclassified: A Recircumscription of Dioscoreaceae and Dioscoreales", Taxon, 51 (1): 103, doi:10.2307/1554967, JSTOR 1554967
- Christenhusz, Maarten JM & Byng, J. W. (2016). "The number of known plants species in the world and its annual increase". Phytotaxa. 261 (3): 201–217. doi:10.11646/phytotaxa.261.3.1.
- Lindley, John (1830). An introduction to the natural system of botany : or, A systematic view of the organisation, natural affinities, and geographical distribution, of the whole vegetable kingdom : together with the uses of the most important species in medicine, the arts, and rural or domestic economy. London: Longman.
- Hertweck, Kate L.; Kinney, Michael S.; Stuart, Stephanie A.; Maurin, Olivier; Mathews, Sarah; Chase, Mark W.; Gandolfo, Maria A.; Pires, J. Chris (July 2015). "Phylogenetics, divergence times and diversification from three genomic partitions in monocots". Botanical Journal of the Linnean Society. 178 (3): 375–393. doi:10.1111/boj.12260.
- Merckx, V.; Schols, P.; Kamer, H. M.-v. d.; Maas, P.; Huysmans, S.; Smets, E. (1 November 2006). "Phylogeny and evolution of Burmanniaceae (Dioscoreales) based on nuclear and mitochondrial data". American Journal of Botany. 93 (11): 1684–1698. doi:10.3732/ajb.93.11.1684. PMID 21642114. S2CID 27371669.
- Merckx, Vincent S. F. T.; Smets, Erik F. (February 2014), "the 101st Anniversary of a Botanical Mystery", International Journal of Plant Sciences, 175 (2): 165–175, doi:10.1086/674315, S2CID 84525776
- Merckx, Vincent; Bakker, Freek T.; Huysmans, Suzy; Smets, Erik (February 2009). "Bias and conflict in phylogenetic inference of myco-heterotrophic plants: a case study in Thismiaceae". Cladistics. 25 (1): 64–77. doi:10.1111/j.1096-0031.2008.00241.x. PMID 34879617. S2CID 85007911.
- Merckx, V; Huysmans, S; Smets, EF (2010). Cretaceous origins of mycoheterotrophic lineages in Dioscoreales (PDF). pp. 39–53. Archived from the original (PDF) on 1 February 2016., In Seberg et al (2010)
- Seberg, Ole; Petersen, Gitte; Barfod, Anders; Davis, Jerrold I., eds. (2010). Diversity, phylogeny, and evolution in the Monocotyledons: proceedings of the Fourth International Conference on the Comparative Biology of the Monocotyledons and the Fifth International Symposium on Grass Systematics and Evolution. Århus: Aarhus University Press. ISBN 978-87-7934-398-6.

=== APG ===
- APG I (1998). "An ordinal classification for the families of flowering plants". Annals of the Missouri Botanical Garden. 85 (4): 531–553. doi:10.2307/2992015. JSTOR 2992015.
- APG II (2003). "An Update of the Angiosperm Phylogeny Group Classification for the orders and families of flowering plants: APG II". Botanical Journal of the Linnean Society. 141 (4): 399–436. doi:10.1046/j.1095-8339.2003.t01-1-00158.x.
- APG III (2009). "An Update of the Angiosperm Phylogeny Group classification for the orders and families of flowering plants: APG III". Botanical Journal of the Linnean Society. 161 (2): 105–121. doi:10.1111/j.1095-8339.2009.00996.x. hdl:10654/18083.
- APG IV (2016). "An update of the Angiosperm Phylogeny Group classification for the orders and families of flowering plants: APG IV". Botanical Journal of the Linnean Society. 181 (1): 1–20. doi:10.1111/boj.12385.
