= Fungivore =

Organism that consumes fungi

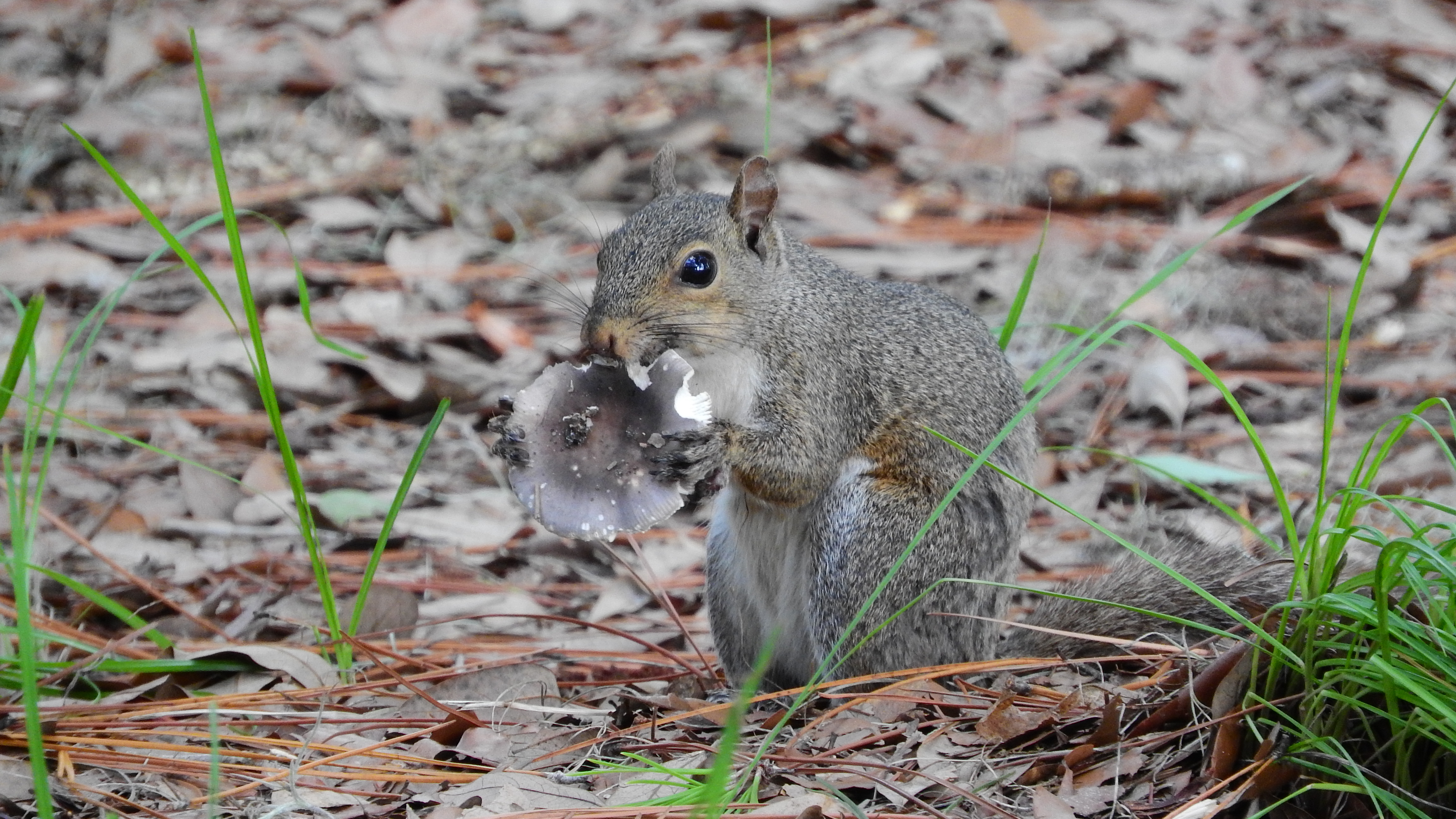
A squirrel (Sciurus carolinensis) feeding on a mushroom

Fungivory or mycophagy is the process of organisms consuming fungi. Many different organisms have been recorded to gain their energy from consuming fungi, including birds, mammals, insects, plants, amoebas, gastropods, nematodes, bacteria and other fungi. Some of these, which only eat fungi, are called fungivores (or mycophages) whereas others eat fungi as only part of their diet, being omnivores.

== Animals ==
=== Mammals ===
Many mammals eat fungi, but only a few feed exclusively on fungi; most are opportunistic feeders and fungi only make up part of their diet. At least 22 species of primate, including humans, bonobos, colobines, gorillas, lemurs, macaques, mangabeys, marmosets and vervet monkeys are known to feed on fungi. Most of these species spend less than 5% of the time they spend feeding eating fungi, and fungi therefore form only a small part of their diet. Some species spend longer foraging for fungi, and fungi account for a greater part of their diet; buffy-tufted marmosets spend up to 12% of their time consuming sporocarps, Goeldi’s monkeys spend up to 63% of their time doing so and the Yunnan snub-nosed monkey spends up to 95% of its feeding time eating lichens. Fungi are very rare in tropical rainforests compared to other food sources such as fruit and leaves, and they are also distributed more sparsely and appear unpredictably, making them a challenging source of food for Goeldi’s monkeys.

Fungi are renowned for their poisons to deter animals from feeding on them: even today humans die from eating poisonous fungi. A natural consequence of this is the virtual absence of obligate vertebrate fungivores, with the diprotodont family Potoridae being the major exception. One of the few extant vertebrate fungivores is the northern flying squirrel, but it is believed that in the past there were numerous vertebrate fungivores and that toxin development greatly lessened their number and forced these species to abandon fungi or diversify.

=== Mollusks ===
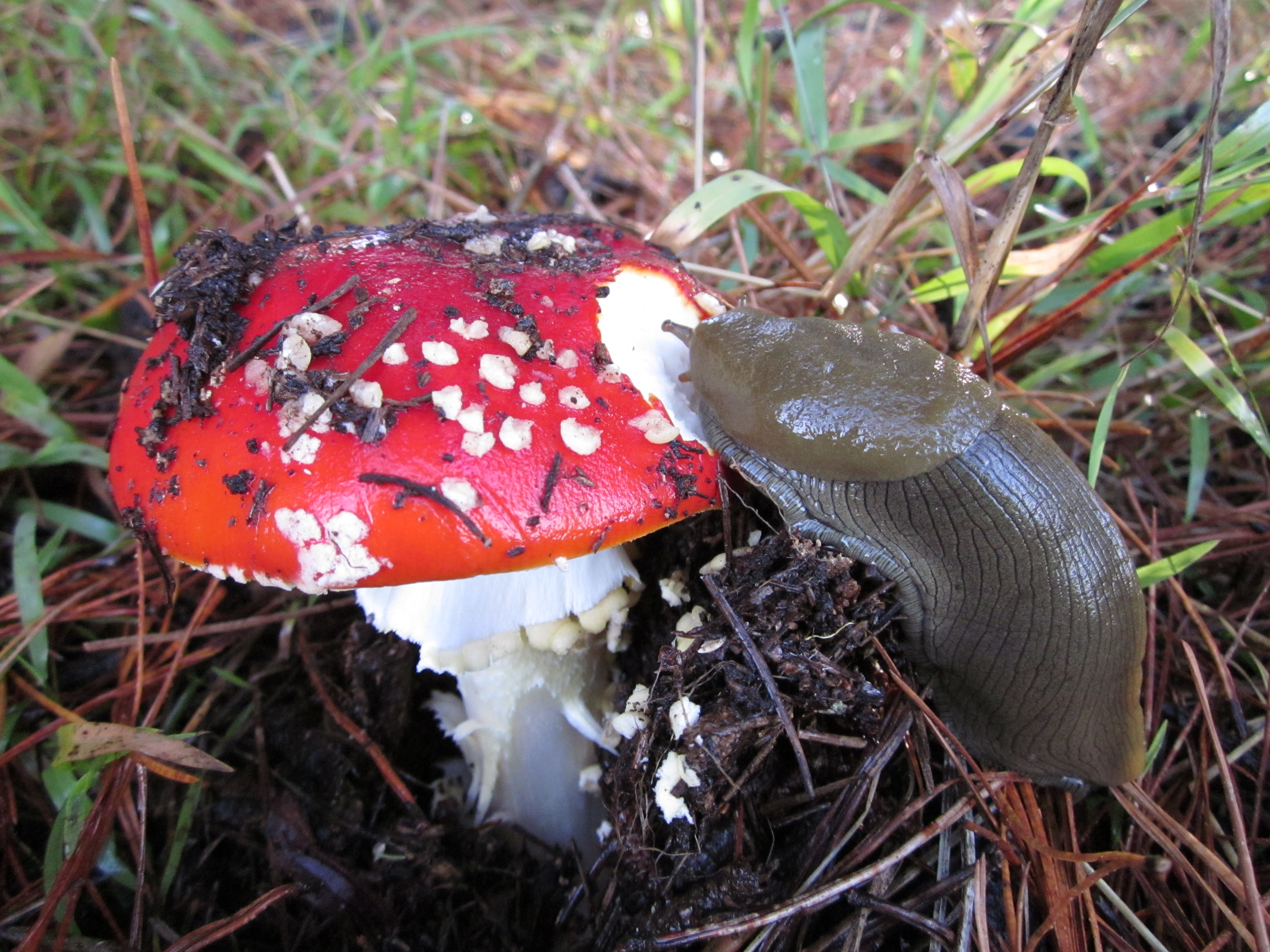
A banana slug feeding on Amanita

Many terrestrial gastropod mollusks are known to feed on fungi. It is the case in several species of slugs from distinct families. Among them are the Philomycidae (e. g. Philomycus carolinianus and Phylomicus flexuolaris) and Ariolimacidae (Ariolimax californianus), which respectively feed on slime molds (myxomycetes) and mushrooms (basidiomycetes). Species of mushroom producing fungi used as food source by slugs include milk-caps, Lactarius spp., the oyster mushroom, Pleurotus ostreatus and the penny bun, Boletus edulis. Other species pertaining to different genera, such as Agaricus, Pleurocybella and Russula, are also eaten by slugs. Slime molds used as food source by slugs include Stemonitis axifera and Symphytocarpus flaccidus. Some slugs are selective towards certain parts or developmental stages of the fungi they eat, though this behavior varies greatly and with other slugs and/or other fungi, whole mushrooms can be eaten unselectively.

=== Insects ===
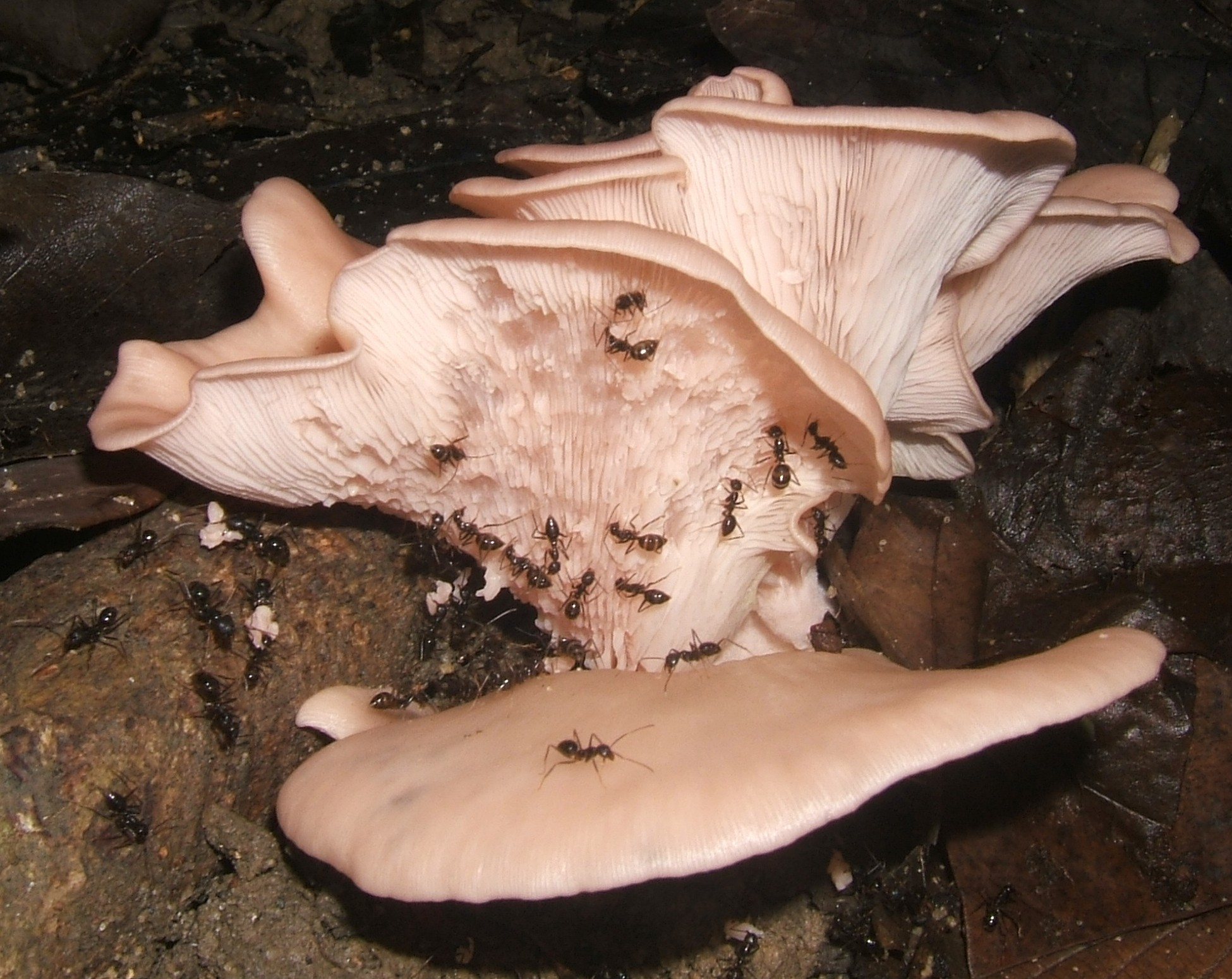
Euprenolepis procera, the only species of ant known to harvest mushrooms, feeding on a Pleurotus mushroom

In 2008, Euprenolepis procera, a species of ant from the rainforests of South East Asia was found to harvest mushrooms from the rainforest. Witte & Maschwitz found that their diet consisted almost entirely of mushrooms, representing a previously undiscovered feeding strategy in ants. Several beetle families, including the Erotylidae, Endomychidae, and certain Tenebrionidae also are specialists on fungi, though they may eat other foods occasionally. Other insects, like fungus gnats and scuttle flies, utilize fungi at their larval stage. Feeding on fungi is crucial for dead wood eaters as this is the only way to acquire nutrients not available in nutritionally scarce dead wood.

=== Birds ===
Jays (Perisoreus) are believed to be the first birds in which mycophagy was recorded. Canada jays (P. canadensis), Siberian jays (P. infaustus) and Oregon jays (P. obscurus) have all been recorded to eat mushrooms, with the stomachs of Siberian jays containing mostly fungi in the early winter. The ascomycete, Phaeangium lefebvrei found in north Africa and the Middle East is eaten by migrating birds in winter and early spring, mainly by species of lark (Alaudidae). Bedouin hunters have been reported to use P. lefebvrei as bait in traps to attract birds. The ground-foraging superb lyrebird Menura novaehollandiae has also been found to opportunistically forage on fungi.

Fungi are known to form an important part of the diet of the southern cassowary (Casuarius casuarius) of Australia. Bracket fungi have been found in their droppings throughout the year, and Simpson in the Australasian Mycological Newsletter suggested it is likely they also eat species of Agaricales and Pezizales but these have not been found in their droppings since they disintegrate when they are eaten. Emus (Dromaius novaehollandiae) will eat immature Lycoperdon and Bovista fungi if presented to them as will brush turkeys (Alectura lathami) if offered Mycena, suggesting that species of Megapodiidae may feed opportunistically on mushrooms.

== Microbial ==
=== Fungi ===
Mycoparasitism occurs when any fungus feeds on other fungi, a form of parasitism, our knowledge of it in natural environments is very limited. Collybia grow on dead mushrooms.

The fungal genus, Trichoderma produces enzymes such as chitinases which degrade the cell walls of other fungi. They are able to detect other fungi and grow towards them, they then bind to the hyphae of other fungi using lectins on the host fungi as a receptor, forming an appressorium. Once this is formed, Trichoderma inject toxic enzymes into the host and probably peptaibol antibiotics, which create holes in the cell wall, allowing Trichoderma to grow inside of the host and feed. Trichoderma are able to digest sclerotia, durable structures which contain food reserves, which is important if they are to control pathogenic fungi in the long term. Trichoderma species have been recorded as protecting crops from Botrytis cinerea, Rhizoctonia solani, Alternaria solani, Glomerella graminicola, Phytophthora capsici, Magnaporthe grisea and Colletotrichum lindemuthianum; although this protection may not be entirely due to Trichoderma digesting these fungi, but by them improving plant disease resistance indirectly.

=== Bacteria ===
Bacterial mycophagy was a term coined in 2005, to describe the ability of some bacteria to "grow at the expense of living fungal hyphae". In a 2007 review in the New Phytologist this definition was adapted to only include bacteria which play an active role in gaining nutrition from fungi, excluding those that feed off passive secretions by fungi, or off dead or damaged hyphae. The majority of our knowledge in this area relates to interactions between bacteria and fungi in the soil and in or around plants, little is known about interactions in marine and freshwater habitats, or those occurring on or inside animals. It is not known what effects bacterial mycophagy has on the fungal communities in nature.

There are three mechanisms by which bacteria feed on fungi; they either kill fungal cells, cause them to secrete more material out of their cells or enter into the cells to feed internally and they are categorised according to these habits. Those that kill fungal cells are called necrotrophs, the molecular mechanisms of this feeding are thought to overlap considerably with bacteria that feed on fungi after they have died naturally. Necrotrophs may kill the fungi through digesting their cell wall or by producing toxins which kill fungi, such as tolaasin produced by Pseudomonas tolaasii. Both of these mechanisms may be required since fungal cell walls are highly complex, so require many different enzymes to degrade them, and because experiments demonstrate that bacteria that produce toxins cannot always infect fungi. It is likely that these two systems act synergistically, with the toxins killing or inhibiting the fungi and exoenzymes degrading the cell wall and digesting the fungus. Examples of necrotrophs include Staphylococcus aureus which feed on Cryptococcus neoformans, Aeromonas caviae which feed on Rhizoctonia solani, Sclerotium rolfsii and Fusarium oxysporum, and some myxobacteria which feed on Cochliobolus miyabeanus and Rhizoctonia solani.

Bacteria which manipulate fungi to produce more secretions which they in turn feed off are called extracellular biotrophs; many bacteria feed on fungal secretions, but do not interact directly with the fungi and these are called saprotrophs, rather than biotrophs. Extracellular biotrophs could alter fungal physiology in three ways; they alter their development, the permeability of their membranes (including the efflux of nutrients) and their metabolism. The precise signalling molecules that are used to achieve these changes are unknown, but it has been suggested that auxins (better known for their role as a plant hormone) and quorum sensing molecules may be involved. Bacteria have been identified that manipulate fungi in these ways, for example mycorrhiza helper bacteria (MHBs) and Pseudomonas putida, but it remains to be demonstrated whether the changes they cause are directly beneficial to the bacteria. In the case of MHBs, which increase infection of plant roots by mycorrhizal fungi, they may benefit, because the fungi gain nutrition from the plant and in turn the fungi will secrete more sugars.

The third group, that enter into living fungal cells are called endocellular biotrophs. Some of these are transmitted vertically whereas others are able to actively invade and subvert fungal cells. The molecular interactions involved in these interactions are mostly unknown. Many endocellular biotrophs, for example some Burkholderia species, belong to the β-proteobacteria which also contains species which live inside the cells of mammals and amoeba. Some of them, for example Candidatus Glomeribacter gigasporarum, which colonises the spores of Gigaspora margarita, have reduced genome sizes indicating that they have become entirely dependent on the metabolic functions of the fungal cells in which they live. When all the endocellular bacteria inside G. margarita were removed, the fungus grew differently and was less fit, suggesting that some bacteria may also provide services to the fungi they live in.

=== Ciliates ===
The ciliate family Grossglockneridae, including the species Grossglockneria acuta, feed exclusively on fungi. G. acuta first attaches themselves to a hyphae or sporangium via a feeding tube and then a ring-shaped structure, around 2 μm in diameter is observed to appear on the fungus, possibly consisting of degraded cell wall material. G. acuta then feeds through the hole in the cell wall for, on average, 10 minutes, before detaching itself and moving away. The precise mechanism of feeding is not known, but it conceivably involves enzymes including acid phosphatases, cellulases and chitinases. Microtubules are visible in the feeding tube, as are possible reserves of cell membrane, which may be used to form food vacuoles filled with the cytoplasm of the fungus, via endocytosis, which are then transported back into G. acuta. The holes made by G. acuta bear some similarities to those made by amoeba, but unlike amoeba G. acuta never engulfs the fungus.

== Plants ==
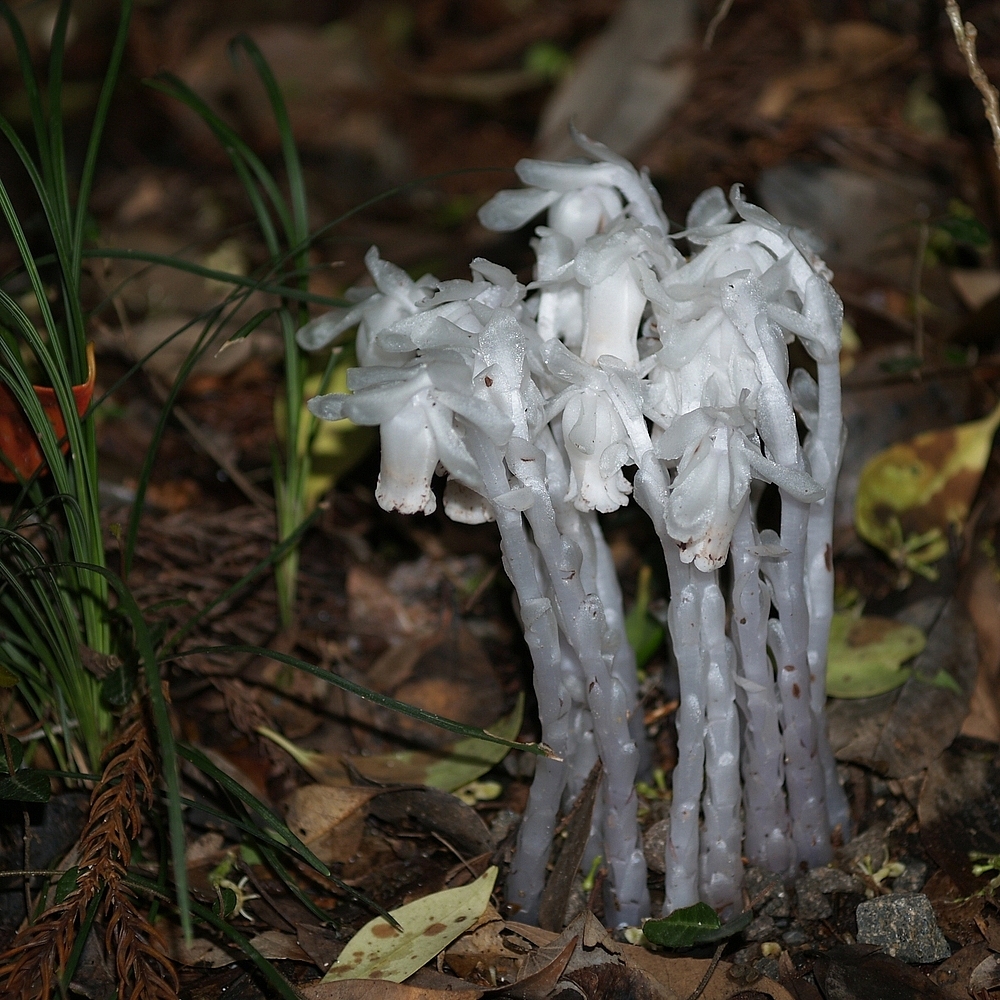
Monotropastrum humile, a myco-heterotroph dependent on fungi throughout its lifetime

Around 90% of land plants live in symbiosis with mycorrhizal fungi, where fungi gain sugars from plants and plants gain nutrients from the soil via the fungi. Some species of plant have evolved to manipulate this symbiosis, so that they no longer give fungi sugars that they produce and instead gain sugars from the fungi, a process called myco-heterotrophy. Some plants are only dependent on fungi as a source of sugars during the early stages of their development, these include most of the orchids as well as many ferns and lycopods. Others are dependent on this food source for their entire lifetime, including some orchids and Gentianaceae, and all species of Monotropaceae and Triuridaceae. Those that are dependent on fungi, but still photosynthesise are called mixotrophs since they gain nutrition in more than one way, by gaining a significant amount of sugars from fungi, they are able to grow in the deep shade of forests. Examples include the orchids Epipactis, Cephalanthera and Plantanthera and the tribe Pyroleae of the family Ericaceae. Others, such as Monotropastrum humile, no longer photosynthesise and are totally dependent on fungi for nutrients. Around 230 such species exist, and this trait is thought to have evolved independently on five occasions outside of the orchid family. Some individuals of the orchid species Cephalanthera damasonium are mixotrophs, but others do not photosynthesise. Because the fungi that myco-heterotrophic plants gain sugars from in turn gain them from plants that do photosynthesise, they are considered indirect parasites of other plants. The relationship between orchids and orchid mycorrhizae has been suggested to be somewhere between predation and parasitism.

The precise mechanisms by which these plants gain sugars from fungi are not known and has not been demonstrated scientifically. Two pathways have been proposed; they may either degrade fungal biomass, particularly the fungal hyphae which penetrate plant cells in a similar manner to in arbuscular mycorrhizae, or absorb sugars from the fungi by disrupting their cell membranes, through mass flow. To prevent the sugars returning to the fungi, they must compartmentalise the sugars or convert them into forms which the fungi cannot use.

== Fungal farming ==
=== Insects ===
Three insect lineages, beetles, ants and termites, independently evolved the ability to farm fungi between 40 and 60 million years ago. In a similar way to the way that human societies became more complex after the development of plant-based agriculture, the same occurred in these insect lineages when they evolved this ability and these insects are now of major importance in ecosystems. The methods that insects use to farm fungi share fundamental similarities with human agriculture. Firstly, insects inoculate a particular habitat or substrate with fungi, much in the same as humans plant seeds in fields. Secondly, they cultivate the fungi by regulating the growing environment to try to improve the growth of the fungus, as well as protecting it from pests and diseases. Thirdly they harvest the fungus when it is mature and feed on it. Lastly they are dependent on the fungi they grow, in the same way that humans are dependent on crops.

==== Beetles ====
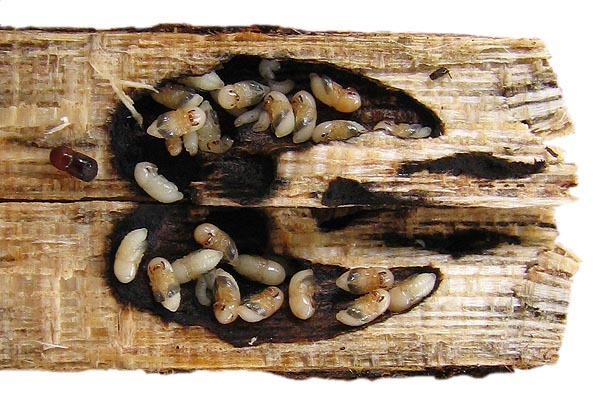
Gallery of Xylosandrus crassiusculus split open, with larvae and black fungus

Ambrosia beetles, for example Austroplatypus incompertus, farm ambrosia fungi inside of trees and feed on them. The mycangia (organs which carry fungal spores) of ambrosia beetles contain various species of fungus, including species of Ambrosiomyces, Ambrosiella, Ascoidea, Ceratocystis, Dipodascus, Diplodia, Endomycopsis, Monacrosporium and Tuberculariella. The ambrosia fungi are only found in the beetles and their galleries, suggesting that they and the beetles have an obligate symbiosis.

==== Termites ====
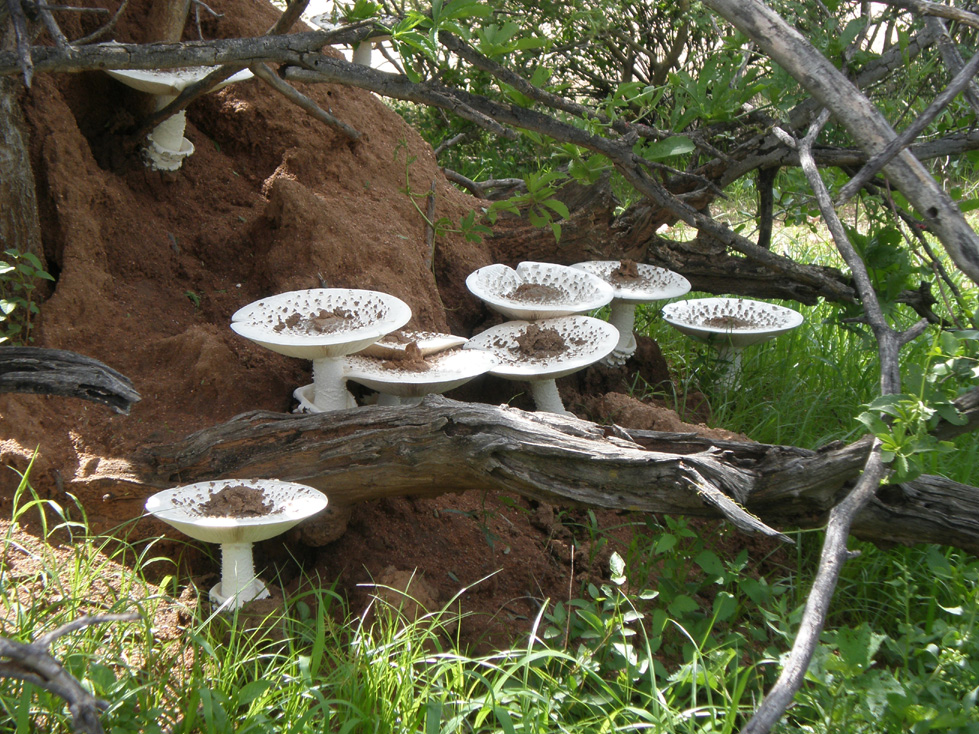
Termitomyces mushrooms growing out of a termite nest

Around 330 species of termites in twelve genera of the subfamily Macrotermitinae cultivate a specialised fungus in the genus Termitomyces. The fungus is kept in a specialised part of the nest in fungus cones. Worker termites eat plant matter, producing faecal pellets which they continuously place on top of the cone. The fungus grows into this material and soon produces immature mushrooms, a rich source of protein, sugars and enzymes, which the worker termites eat. The nodules also contain indigestible asexual spores, meaning that the faecal pellets produced by the workers always contain spores of the fungus that colonise the plant material that they defaecate. The Termitomyces also fruits, forming mushrooms above ground, which mature at the same time that the first workers emerge from newly formed nests. The mushrooms produce spores that are wind dispersed, and through this method, new colonies acquire a fungal strain. In some species, the genetic variation of the fungus is very low, suggesting that spores of the fungus are transmitted vertically from nest to nest, rather than from wind dispersed spores.

==== Ants ====
Around 220 described species, and more undescribed species of ants in the tribe Attini cultivate fungi. They are only found in the New World and are thought to have evolved in the Amazon rainforest, where they are most diverse today. For these ants, farmed fungi are the only source of food on which their larvae are raised on and are also an important food for adults. Queen ants carry a small part of fungus in small pouches in their mouthparts when they leave the nest to mate, allowing them to establish a new fungus garden when they form a new nest. Different lineages cultivate fungi on different substrates, those that evolved earlier do so on a wide range of plant matter, whereas leaf cutter ants are more selective, mainly using only fresh leaves and flowers. The fungi are members of the families Lepiotaceae and Pterulaceae. Other fungi in the genus Escovopsis parasitise the gardens and antibiotic-producing bacteria also inhabit the gardens.

=== Gastropods ===
The marine snail Littoraria irrorata, which lives in the salt marshes of the southeast of the United States feeds on fungi that it encourages to grow. It creates and maintains wounds on the grass, Spartina alterniflora which are then infected by fungi, probably of the genera Phaeosphaeria and Mycosphaerella, which are the preferred diet of the snail. They also deposit faeces on the wounds that they create, which encourage the growth of the fungi because they are rich in nitrogen and fungal hyphae. Juvenile snails raised on uninfected leaves do not grow and are more likely to die, indicating the importance of the fungi in the diet of L. irrorata.

== See also ==
- Edible mushroom
- Mushroom diet
