= Andresia =

Andresia may refer to:

- Andresia (cnidarian), a genus of cnidarians in the family Andresiidae
- Andresia, a genus of plants in the family Ericaceae, synonym of Cheilotheca
