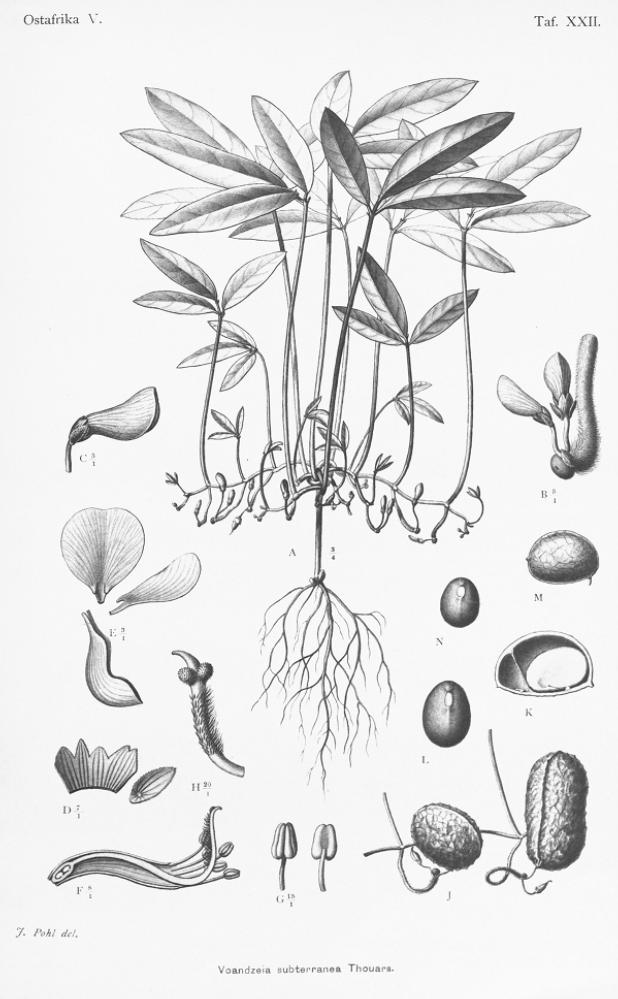

Scientific classification
- Kingdom: Plantae
- Clade: Tracheophytes
- Clade: Angiosperms
- Clade: Eudicots
- Clade: Rosids
- Order: Fabales
- Family: Fabaceae
- Subfamily: Faboideae
- Genus: Vigna
- Species: V. subterranea

Binomial name
- Vigna subterranea (L.) Verdc.

Synonyms
- Arachis africana Burm. f.; Glycine subterranea L.; Voandzeia subterranea (L.) Thouars; Voandzeia subterranea (L.) DC.

= Vigna subterranea =

Species of plant

Vigna subterranea (common names: Bambara groundnut, Bambara nut, Bambara bean, manicongo, Congo goober, earth pea, ground-bean, or hog-peanut) is a member of the family Fabaceae. Its name is derived from the Bambara ethnic group. It reproduces via geocarpy, ripening its pods underground, much like the peanut (also called a groundnut).

The plant originated in West Africa. As a food and source of income, the Bambara groundnut is considered to be the third most important leguminous crop in those African countries where it is grown, after peanut and cowpea. The crop is mainly cultivated, sold and processed by women, and is, thus, particularly valuable for female subsistence farmers.

Bambara groundnut represents the third most important grain legume in semi-arid Africa. It is resistant to high temperatures and is suitable for marginal soils where other leguminous crops cannot be grown. It is a low-impact crop. The entire plant is known for soil improvement because of nitrogen fixation.

The pods can be eaten fresh or boiled after drying, and can be ground either fresh or dry to make puddings.

== Biology ==
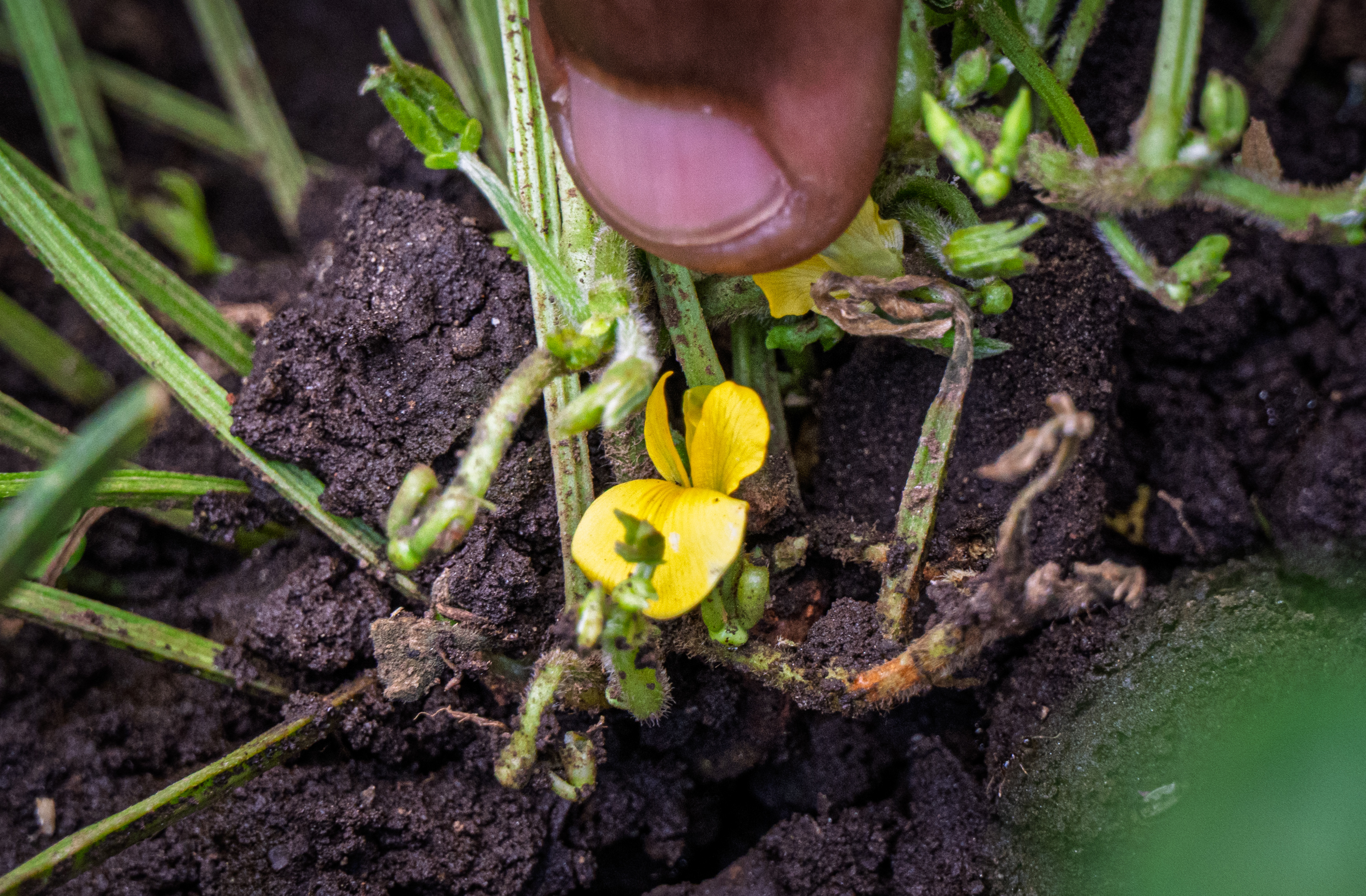
The small yellow flower of Bambara groundnut ('Vigna subterranea') emerges at the base of the plant near soil level. The crop is almost entirely self-fertilising, which limits natural genetic diversity.

Bambara groundnut is a herbaceous, intermediate, annual plant, with creeping stems at ground level. It is a small legume plant that grows to a height of 0.25–0.37 metres (10 in – 1 ft 2 1/2 in) with compound leaves of three leaflets having stipules about 3 mm long. The flowers have a tube calyx about 1 mm long and 5 lobes about 1 mm long as well as a whitish yellow corolla, 4–7 mm long. The fruit is an indehiscent pod almost globose about 2.5 cm in diameter. The plant generally looks like bunched leaves arising from branched stems, which form a crown on the soil surface.

Bambara groundnut is considered as a fast-growing crop. The growth cycle is between (min-max) 90–170 days and under optimal conditions the cycle is about 120–150 days to pod maturity. Flowers appear 40–60 days after planting. After pollination, the pod reaches maturity, and during another 55 days, the seeds fully develop, producing again every 30 days.

Generative reproduction is for the Bambara groundnut autogamous, (self-fertilization), and (self-pollinating). After self-fertilization, pale yellow flowers are borne on the freely growing branching stems; these stems then grow downwards into the soil, taking the developing seed within the pods, which makes breeding and development of new cultivars for the traits of interest difficult. The seeds will form pods encasing seeds just below the soil. The pods are round, wrinkled and each contains one or two seeds that are round, smooth and very hard when dried.The seeds may be cream colored, brown, red, mottled or black eyed and their size is about 8.5–15 mm × 6.5–10 mm × 5.5–9 mm.

Several factors are essential for promoting cross-pollination in Bambara and these include a proper nursery habitat, short day lengths (<12h), an average temperature of 26 °C, which is necessary for optimum flowering and pod formation and a relative humidity of 90%. The strict photoperiod requirement of Bambara groundnut also limits its productivity in countries further away from the equator. In some accessions, long days (>12h) negatively affect pod-setting, resulting in crop failure.

The genus Vigna, which includes about 80 species, is found throughout the tropics. There are considerable morphological differences between wild and domesticated types of Bambara groundnuts. Long runners are produced by wild Bambara groundnut, and the seeds are smaller (9–11 mm long) and more uniform in size. The pods are thin and do not wrinkle when drying. Domesticated versions are more compact, have fleshy pods that wrinkle as they dry, with longer, less slender, and more erect petioles, and larger seeds (11–15 mm long). Wild and domesticated types are sometimes distinguished as var. spontanea (Harms) Hepper (wild) and var. subterranea (cultivated).

== Origins and domestication ==
The Bambara groundnut is thought to have originated in West Africa, particularly in areas now known as Nigeria, Cameroon, and the Central African Republic. It was domesticated by local communities and has been cultivated for centuries as an important source of nutrition and sustenance. Its cultural significance is notable among the Bambara people of Mali, from whom its common name is derived.

== Distribution ==
The spread of V. subterranea beyond its native range is closely linked to the interplay of human migration, trade, colonialism and agricultural practices.

The Bambara groundnut is predominantly cultivated across Sub-Saharan Africa, encompassing several regions. In West Africa, it is grown in countries such as Benin, Ghana, Togo, Nigeria, Ivory Coast, Mali, Burkina Faso, Guinea-Bissau, and Senegal. In Central Africa, it is found in Cameroon, Chad, the Central African Republic, and the Democratic Republic of the Congo. Nations in East Africa like Kenya, Uganda, Tanzania, Ethiopia, and Sudan also cultivate it. In Southern Africa, it is grown in countries such as Angola, Namibia, Mozambique, Zambia, and Eswatini (formerly Swaziland).

Beyond Africa, Bambara groundnut has been introduced to other continents. On the Indian Ocean Islands, it is found in Madagascar, where it is known locally as voanjobory or voanjabory and remains an important component of traditional cuisine. It is also cultivated in Mauritius and the Comoro Islands. In Asia, it is cultivated in India, particularly in the state of Karnataka, and in Indonesia, especially on the island of Java. In Australasia, it is grown in Papua New Guinea.

In the Caribbean, it is grown in Dominican Republic where it is known as "manicongo". It was once common in local markets but has declined in recent decades. This lineage descends from seeds that were carried to the Americas by enslaved people during the Atlantic slave trade and the Age of Discovery.

== Ecology ==
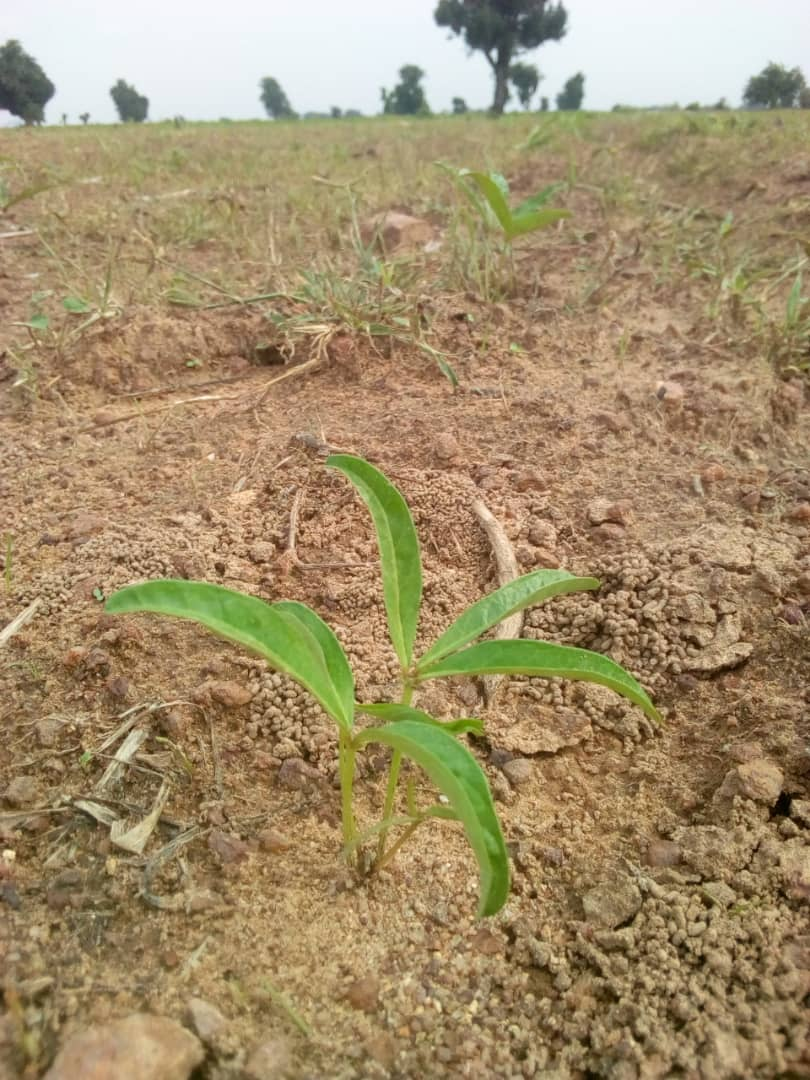
Little plant of Bambara nut/ Bambara groundnut

=== Biological nitrogen fixation ===
Like many other legumes, Bambara groundnut fixes atmospheric nitrogen through the process of biological nitrogen fixation. Its potential to be used as an alternative to chemical fertilizer in agriculture has been investigated for many years. The process is also very important to improve soil fertility and to supply other non-leguminous crops with the nitrogen left in the soil after the legume is harvested.

== Cultivation ==
=== Soil requirements ===
Optimal soils for Bambara groundnut production are sandy soils to prevent waterlogging. Well-drained soils make the harvest easier and prevent rotting of the pods. Stony areas are typically avoided to prevent damage of the pods.

Optimal soil depth is between 50 and 100 cm, with a light soil texture. Soil fertility should be low and soil pH is best suited between 5 and 6.5 and should not be lower than 4.3 or higher than 7. Bambara groundnut is tolerant of salinity, but high sodium chloride concentration in the soil will result in yield losses.

=== Climate requirements ===
The production is best suited between a latitude of 20° and 30°, i.e. the tropical wet and dry (Aw) and the subtropical dry summer (Cs) climate zones. Optimal temperature is between 19 °C and 30 °C. Temperatures below 16 °C and above 38 °C are not suited for the production of Bambara groundnut.

The Bambara groundnut is very drought-resistant. The minimal annual rainfall requirement is about 300 mm and optimal annual rainfall is between 750 mm and 1400 mm and should not exceed 3000 mm. Bambara groundnut can tolerate heavy rainfall, but it will result in yield losses if they happen at harvest.

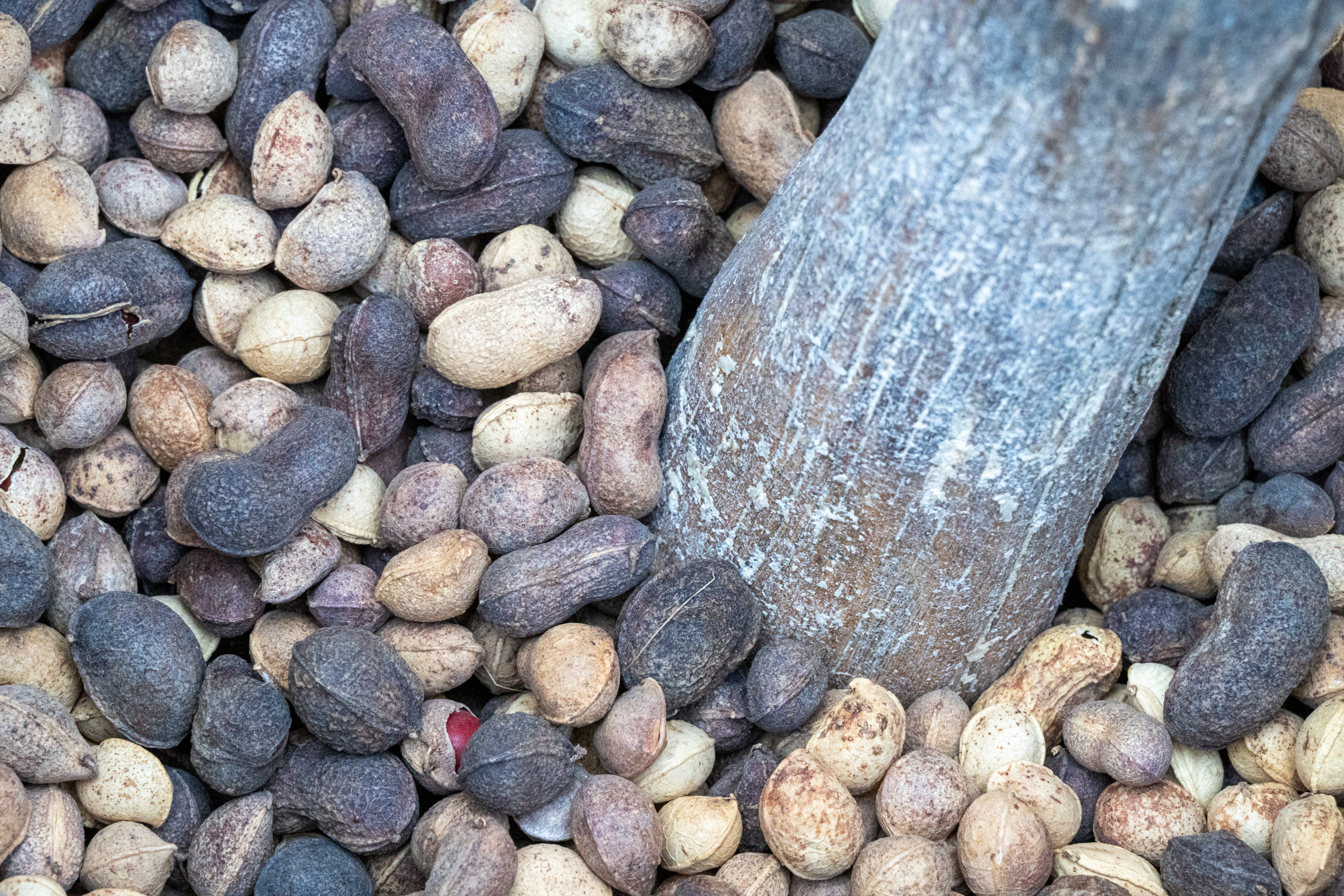
Traditional deshelling of Bambara groundnut using a wooden pestle and mortar in Unyamikumbi village, Singida, Tanzania. The pods are pounded to crack the hard outer shells and release the seeds inside. The wide variation in seed size, shape and colour reflects the use of local landraces maintained by smallholder farmers on family plots rather than uniform commercial varieties.

=== Seedbed requirements and sowing ===
Before sowing, the seeds can be treated with pesticides to prevent insect and fungal attack, and being eaten by bush fowl (Numida meleagris). Priming the seeds with water by soaking them overnight and then drying them before sowing improves seedling emergence, vigour and yield.

Sowing is usually performed manually by peasant farmers in tropical Africa, but it can also be done mechanically on industrial farms using modified soya bean planters. Manual sowing is generally done using a hoe or a cutlass to open the soil. One seed is placed in each hole which are then closed.

Seedbed type does not seem to affect yield or biomass production of Bambara groundnut. The crop can thus be planted on flat terrain, although it is also planted in ridges. Studies show that increased sowing density has a positive effect on production calculated on a per-area basis, but has a negative effect on per-plant yield. It is assumed that at higher sowing densities, increased competition between plants is the cause of lower pod and seed number per plant.

=== Cropping system and fertilization ===
The cropping system is semi-permanent and the Bambara groundnut can be cultivated as single crop or as intercrop. Best suited intercrops are sorghum, millet, maize, peanut, yams and cassava. Bambara groundnut is mainly cultivated as intercrop, however the planting density varies between 6 and 29 plants per square meter. For woodland savannas of Côte d'Ivoire, the highest yield is attainable with a plant density of 25 plants per square meter. Despite its suitability for intercropping systems due to its ability to fix atmospheric nitrogen, a non-negligible proportion of farmers grow the Bambara groundnut in monoculture and report that its performance is better as a single crop. Cultivation is mainly performed manually and is comparable to the production of peanut.

The Bambara groundnut can grow on soils with low fertility and is even reported to do better on these soils than on fertile ones. Nevertheless, phosphate fertilization can have a beneficial effect. For example, the application of superphosphate can improve the yield of the Bambara groundnut. Moreover, fertilization with phosphorus enhances the crop's nitrogen fixation and increases its nitrogen content.

=== Harvest and postharvest treatment ===
The Bambara groundnut typically takes about 130–150 days to mature, but early or late harvests only marginally reduce the yield. The pods, which grow belowground, are harvested manually by pulling out the whole crop and picking the pods by hand. Then, they are usually dried in the sun for some days. Post-harvest losses are reported to be on a low level. However, insect pests can cause damage to stored grains, most importantly Bruchids.

=== Pests and diseases ===
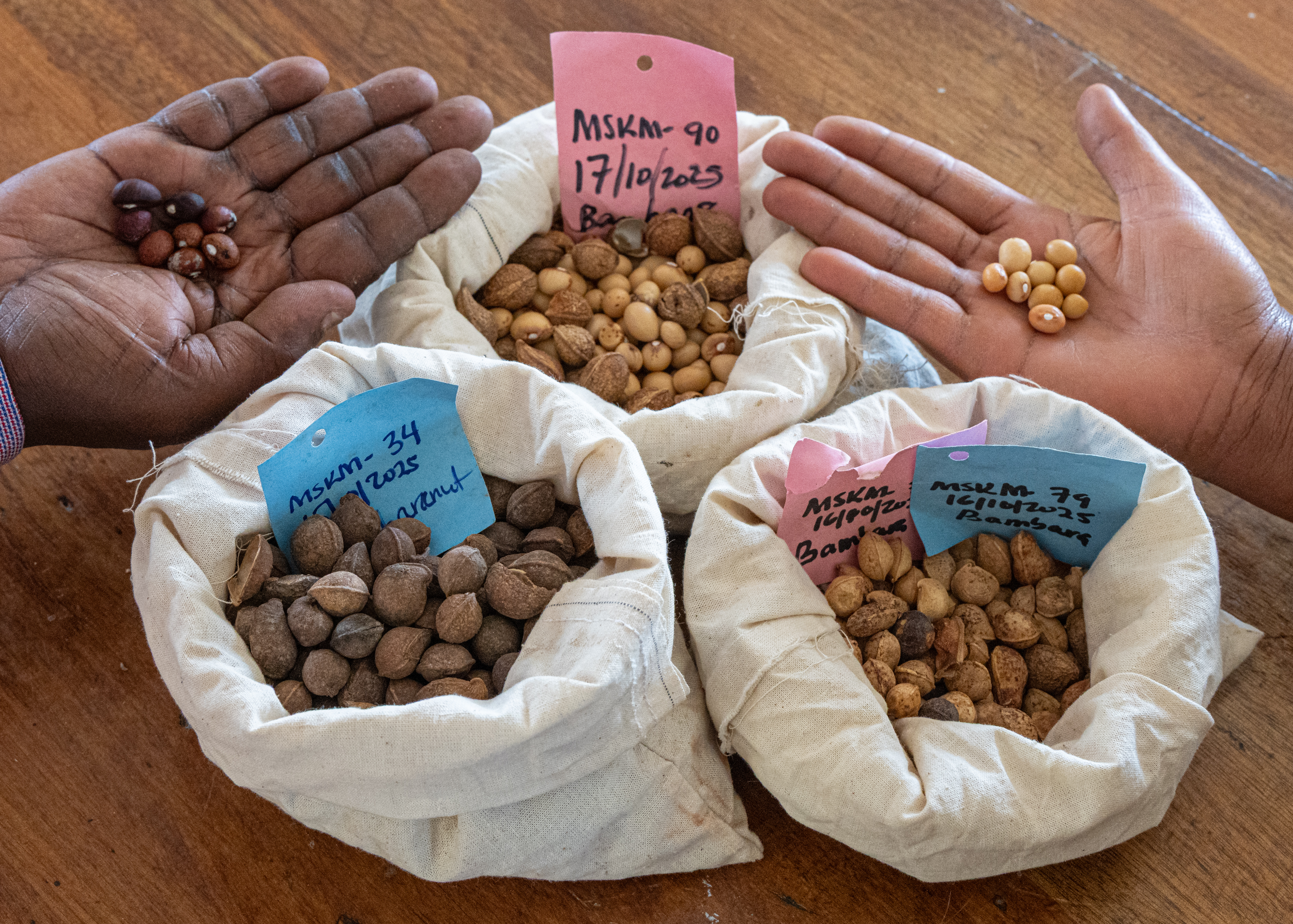
Freshly collected Bambara groundnut accessions still in their field collecting bags at the National Plant Genetic Resources Centre hosted by the Tanzania Plant Health and Pesticides Authority (TPHPA) in Arusha, Tanzania. The accessions have not yet been cleaned, dried and processed for long-term conservation in the genebank.

It is widely regarded as pest and disease resistant. However, there is a lack of evidence to support this claim, with reports of fungal attacks by Rhizoctonia solani in Southern Thailand, and Cercospora canescens and Colletotrichum capsici in Nigeria, causing brown blotch disease. The crop is also susceptible to attack by cowpea weevil (Callosobruchus maculatus).

=== Crop development ===
There are genetic resources available for breeding since around 6145 accessions of Bambara groundnut have been collected and are stored ex situ.

The primary goal of Bambara improvement programs is to focus on seed yield and nutritional quality traits. There is a notable gap between the potential yield of 4 t/ha and the average yield of 0.85 t/ha reported for African countries. Thus, breeding should aim at improving the yield. Results of studies exhibited high protein content among the test genotypes. Similarly, high levels of essential fatty acids, thiamine, ribovin, and vitamin K were recorded. Moreover, scientists examined the chemical properties of starches in Bambara groundnut. The results revealed that seed source and crop management practices affected chemical composition. Food fortification, the use of artificial supplements, and food imports are among the strategies used to overcome the problem of malnutrition in Africa. The adoption of traditional plant breeding methods to enhance nutritional benefits of locally grown food crops such as Bambara groundnut is an economic and affordable strategy to decrease malnutrition in Africa.

The form and colour of Bambara groundnut were all important factors to optimize the best extraction yield of phytochemicals. Overall, the hulls of the crop were the optimum source of flavonoids and tannins: the brown and red hulls had the highest concentration of flavonoids compared to whole and dehulled, with the highest flavonoid concentration being rutin at 24.46 mg g−1 found in brown hulls and myricetin at 1.80 mg g−1 found in red hulls. Lastly, formulating products with higher concentration of Bambara groundnut hulls could potentially result in a product with higher phytochemical content.

== Production ==
=== Importance ===
The annual production of Bambara groundnut is estimated to be 0.2 million tonnes from an area of 0.25 million hectares worldwide. Sub-Saharan Africa (SSA) is the largest producer of Bambara groundnut, while a small quantity is produced in Southeast Asia (e.g. Thailand and Indonesia), the United States, and Australia. Additionally, the crop is cultivated in Brazil, where it was putatively introduced in the 1600s with the slave trade. West Africa is the main Bambara groundnut production region in SSA, where Burkina Faso, Niger, and Cameroon are the leading producers, contributing to 74% of global production. However, it was reported by Ghanaian farmers to contribute neither to a large part of the subsistence food nor of the income.

=== Worldwide production and yield ===
World production of Vigna subterranea increased from 29,800 tonnes in 1972 to 79,155 tonnes in 2015.

Production Year 2013 (Source FAOSTAT)	Area Harvested (ha)	Yield (kg/ha)	Production (tonnes)
Mali	120,000	9,498	113,981
Niger	68,000	4,412	30,000
Burkina Faso	55,000	8,909	49,000
Cameroon	43,392	8,444	36,639
Democratic Republic of the Congo	4,828	750	14,000
World	315,392	7,724	243,620

The top six Bambara groundnut producing countries in Africa in 2018 include Burkina Faso, Niger, Cameroon, Mali, Togo and the Democratic Republic of the Congo with a total production of 0.06, 0.05, 0.04, 0.03, 0.02, and 0.01 million tonnes, respectively.

The yield level of Bambara groundnut in Africa varies from 0.6 to 1 tonne per hectare, depending on variety and production conditions. However, unshelled mean yields of up to 3 tonnes per hectare were reported when cultivating some landraces in the transition agro-ecological zone in Nigeria. A low mean yield of 0.85 tonnes per hectare was reported in Ghana under good management practices close to yield levels of other legumes such as cowpeas (0.80 tonnes per hecatare) and pigeon peas (0.78 tonnes per hectare).

== Nutrition ==
This nutrient-dense legume is sometimes termed a "complete food" due to its balanced macronutrient composition. It is considered to be a neglected and underutilized food source in Benin. The brown hull showed the highest concentrations of rutin and myricetin among flavonoids, while the red hull resulted in having with the highest concentrations of chlorogenic and ellagic acid among tannin compounds.

=== Macronutrient content ===
Raw data

Bambara groundnut has nutritive value ranging between 57.9% to 64% carbohydrate and 24.0% to 25.5% protein content. In comparison, soybean (Glycine max) and chickpea (Cicer ariteneum) have 27% and 61% of carbohydrates.

=== Micronutrient content ===
Micronutrient content of the Bambara groundnut.
Micronutrient	Content	Comparison with chickpeas
Sodium (mg)	0.90 – 25.20	6.7 – 111.57
Potassium (mg)	308.40 – 2200.00	994. 5 – 1279.82
Phosphorus (mg)	173.97 – 563.00	241. 92 – 571.00
Calcium (mg)	0.39 – 76.01	81.70 – 222.65
Magnesium (mg)	124.99 – 555.10	3.21 – 191.00
Iron (mg)	11.38 – 149.50	4.49 – 53.43
Zinc (mg)	2.14 – 19.73	2.45 – 6.33

=== Anti-nutritional factors ===
The presence of anti-nutritional factors (ANFs) in the Vigna subterranea can reduce protein digestibility, affecting bioavailability of amino acids by up to 50%, as well as lowering digestibility and bioavailability of other nutrients. ANFs include enzyme inhibitors, flatulence factors, tannins, phytic acid and saponins. ANFs can be removed or lowered by a variety of treatments:

1. Cooking and thermal treatment of pulse seeds.
2. Applications of pressure, heat, infrared radiation, dry extrusion and chemicals such as cysteine have been shown to reduce trypsin inhibitor activity in whole soybean.

== Uses ==
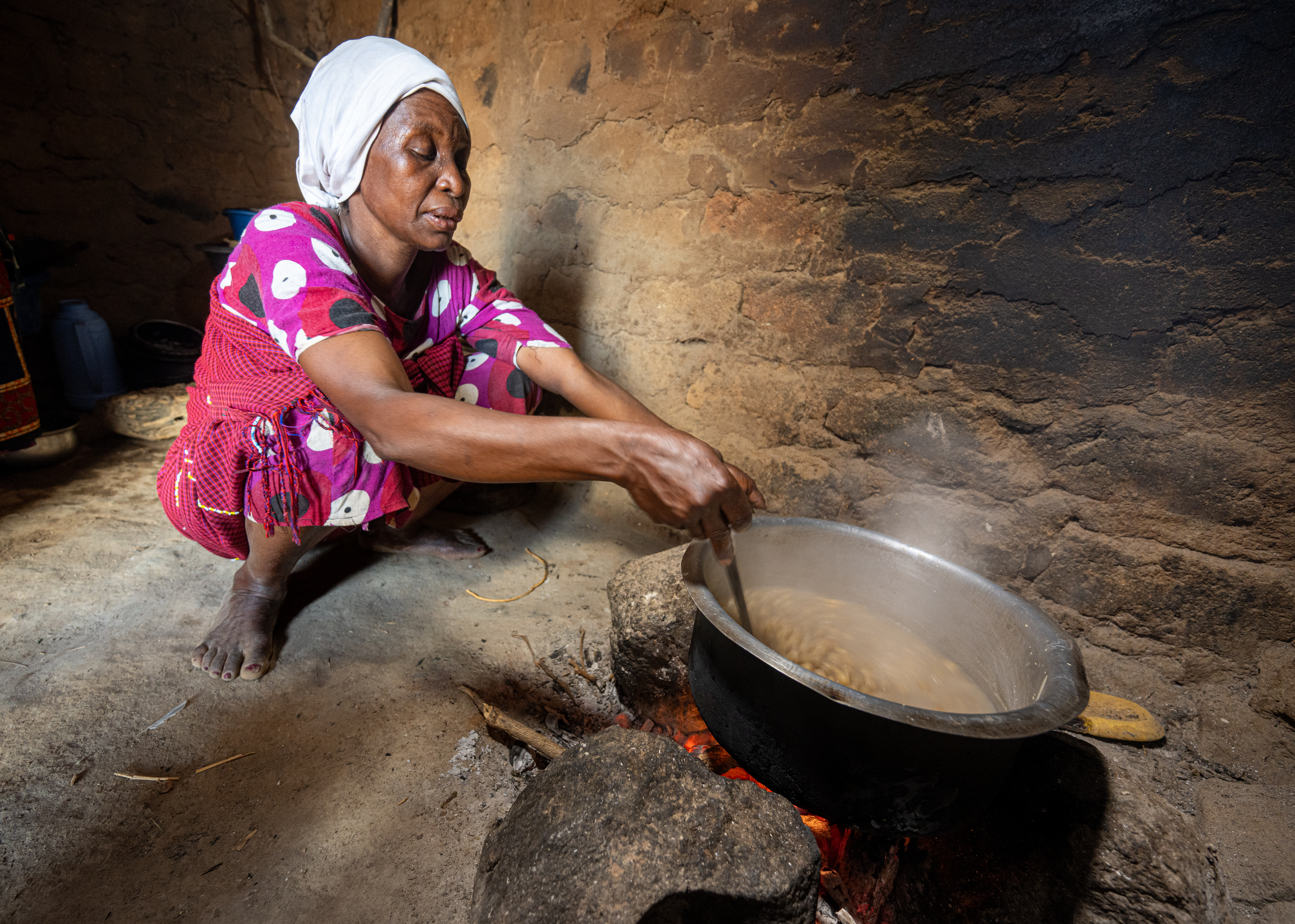
A woman cooks Bambara groundnut over a wood fire in Unyamikumbi village, Singida, Tanzania. Dry Bambara beans can take 3–4 hours to cook, requiring significantly more fuel than other legumes — a factor that limits wider adoption of the crop.

The seeds are used for food, beverages because of their high protein content and for digestive system applications. In West Africa, the nuts are eaten as a snack, roasted and salted, processed into cake, or as a meal, boiled similarly to other beans.

The Bambara groundnut needs to be cooked for a relatively long time, which means that more fuel is needed than for cooking other legumes. The cooking time for fresh beans is 45–60 minutes, and dry beans may even take 3–4 hours. This presents an obstacle to a more widespread use of this crop. Moreover, if the bean is not cooked enough, it can cause bloating of the stomach, constipation and flatulence.

=== Traditional culinary use of Bambara groundnut in Nigeria ===
In South Eastern Nigeria, particularly in Enugu, the dried Bambara beans are ground into a fine powder, then mixed with palm oil, water and, more rarely, vegetables (e.g., utazi), then poured into banana leaf wraps or one-liter cellophane bags before being boiled into a pudding to make okpa, a common breakfast food. During the rainy season in many parts of central Nigeria, the fresh Bambara beans are cooked with their shells still on them, then eaten as a snack.

=== Potential use in probiotic beverage ===
Bambara groundnut milk can be fermented with lactic acid bacteria to make a probiotic beverage that not only increase the economic value of the nutritious legume but also help in addressing malnutrition.

=== Use as livestock feed ===
The Bambara groundnut plays an important role in the diet and culture of populations. The leaves, rich in phosphorus, are used for livestock feed. Seeds are given to pigs and poultry.

=== Traditional African medicine ===
The Bambara groundnut is used in some traditional African medicine.

== Resistance to Abiotic Stresses ==
=== Drought Resistance ===
For the past twenty years [when], a lot of research has looked into how Bambara groundnut plants can survive in dry conditions, mostly by looking at traits that are visible above ground. The species maintains turgor via osmotic adjustment, reductions in leaf area index, and efficient stomatal regulation to minimize water loss. Studies on different genotypes have revealed a range of adaptive drought-evasion strategies. For instance, the Botswana genotype DipC1 and the Tanzanian genotype DodR showed comparatively small reductions in seasonal light interception under water stress (37–47%), whereas the Sierra Leone genotype LunT exhibited a much stronger decline of 71%. Later research showed distinct water-use strategies among landraces: Uniswa Red (from Swaziland) was described as a “water-saver” with early stomatal closure, while S19-3 (from Namibia) was characterized as a “water-spender” with late stomatal closure. These findings were corroborated by subsequent physiological and genetic studies. Genetic mapping efforts have also identified quantitative trait loci (QTLs) associated with drought-related phenotypes in crosses between DipC1 (Botswana) and Tiga Nicuru (Mali). Further research by Kundy (2019) demonstrated that Bambara groundnut landraces and the commercial peanut variety “Manje” exhibited similar yield declines under drought stress (59% vs. 55%, respectively), indicating the high potential of Bambara groundnut for drought tolerance breeding. More recently, root phenomics has become a focus of drought adaptation research in Bambara groundnut. Studies revealed contrasting root system architectures, with deep-cheap rooting patterns in landraces from dry regions and shallow-costly rooting in genotypes from high-rainfall areas. In drought conditions, genotypes with higher root length density at deeper soil layers, such as DodR, showed superior water-foraging ability. These findings suggest long-term ecotypic and possibly genetic differentiation driven by local agroecological conditions.

=== Heat Resistance ===
Although Bambara groundnut is generally drought tolerant, high temperatures particularly above 38 °C combined with low relative humidity can reduce pod yield even under irrigation.Genotypes derived from landraces, such as Rarkins (from Burkina Faso), exhibit superior tolerance to simultaneous heat and drought stress compared to others like Black Eye, NAV 4, NAV Red, and Tom. Field studies have demonstrated that average maximum temperatures up to 34 °C did not significantly impair the physiological performance of some genotypes. However, at 33 °C, Uniswa Red exhibited lower pod yields (35.5 g m⁻²) compared to S19-3 (56.6 g m⁻²), while both performed best at 23 °C (151 g m⁻² and 162 g m⁻², respectively). Subsequent research employing cell membrane thermostability as a metric for heat resistance demonstrated significant variability among genotypes across varying temperatures and exposure durations. The lethal heating duration at 50 °C was suggested as a viable criterion for evaluating genotypes for heat tolerance. These findings demonstrate significant genetic variability in the thermal response of Bambara groundnut, highlighting the necessity of utilizing this diversity in breeding programs aimed at high-temperature environments.
