= Adraneothrips =

Scientific classification
- Kingdom: Animalia
- Phylum: Arthropoda
- Class: Insecta
- Order: Thysanoptera
- Family: Phlaeothripidae
- Genus: Adraneothrips; Hood, 1925

Synonyms
- Stigmothrips Ananthakrishnan, 1964; Baphikothrips Mound, 1970

Genus of thrips

Adraneothrips is a genus of thrips in the family Phlaeothripidae. The genus has its highest species diversity in the New World, particularly the Neotropics, though species are also known from Asia, Australia and Africa.

Many species in Adraneothrips have two-color patterns, and sexual dimorphism is limited. They are associated with leaf litter and other dead leaves, and are presumed mycophagous.

== Species ==
- Adraneothrips abdominalis
- Adraneothrips acutulus
- Adraneothrips acutus
- Adraneothrips alajuela
- Adraneothrips albicollis
- Adraneothrips alternatus
- Adraneothrips andrei
- Adraneothrips antennatus
- Adraneothrips apalus
- Adraneothrips aztecus
- Adraneothrips bambusae
- Adraneothrips bellus
- Adraneothrips biadenes
- Adraneothrips bilineatus
- Adraneothrips braccatus
- Adraneothrips brasiliensis
- Adraneothrips cautus
- Adraneothrips chinensis
- Adraneothrips cinctiventris
- Adraneothrips coloratus
- Adraneothrips darwini
- Adraneothrips decorus
- Adraneothrips desocellatus
- Adraneothrips diligens
- Adraneothrips disjunctus
- Adraneothrips elegans
- Adraneothrips ephippium
- Adraneothrips exiguus
- Adraneothrips falsus
- Adraneothrips faustus
- Adraneothrips fuscicollis
- Adraneothrips gandoca
- Adraneothrips hani
- Adraneothrips hoffi
- Adraneothrips huachucae
- Adraneothrips imbecillus
- Adraneothrips inca
- Adraneothrips infirmus
- Adraneothrips inflavus
- Adraneothrips laticeps
- Adraneothrips lepidus
- Adraneothrips limpidus
- Adraneothrips madrasensis
- Adraneothrips makilingensis
- Adraneothrips microsetis
- Adraneothrips nilgiriensis
- Adraneothrips obliquus
- Adraneothrips oculatus
- Adraneothrips okajimai
- Adraneothrips onustus
- Adraneothrips opacus
- Adraneothrips pallidus
- Adraneothrips peruviensis
- Adraneothrips pinicola
- Adraneothrips poecilonotus
- Adraneothrips pteris
- Adraneothrips pulchellus
- Adraneothrips rostratus
- Adraneothrips russatus
- Adraneothrips saturatus
- Adraneothrips septimanus
- Adraneothrips setosus
- Adraneothrips silvaticus
- Adraneothrips simulator
- Adraneothrips spadix
- Adraneothrips stannardi
- Adraneothrips stenocephalus
- Adraneothrips strasseni
- Adraneothrips tibialis
- Adraneothrips transversus
- Adraneothrips tupi
- Adraneothrips uniformis
- Adraneothrips vacuus
- Adraneothrips waui
- Adraneothrips xanthosoma
- Adraneothrips yunnanensis
