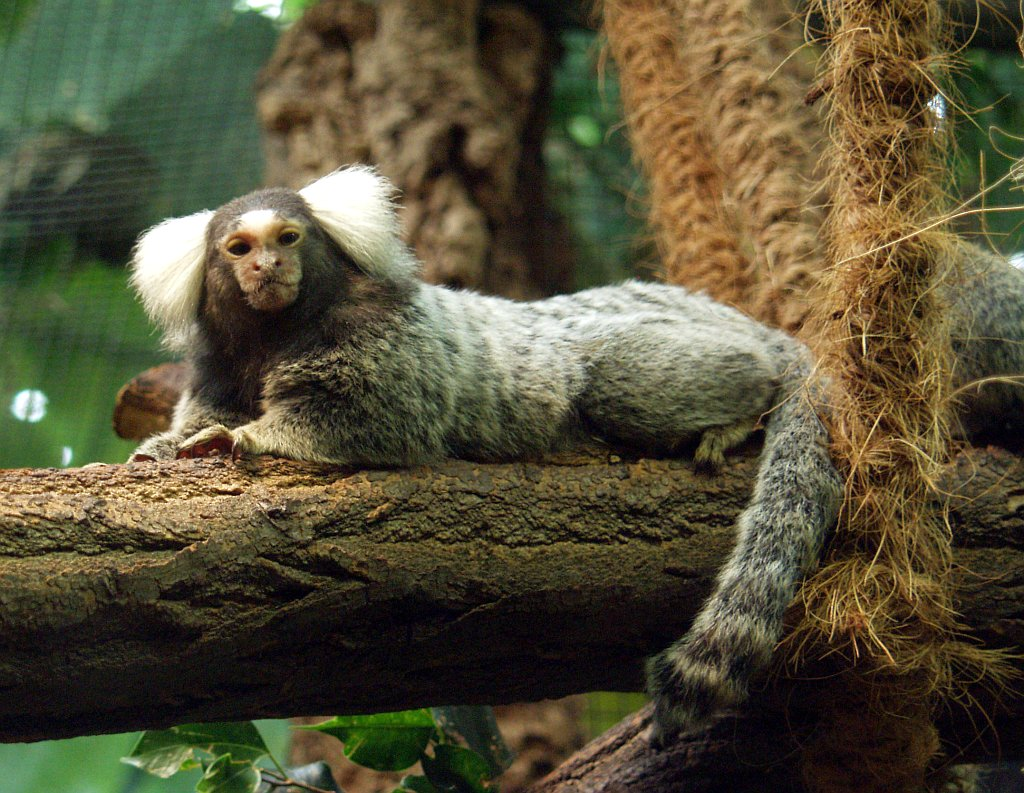
- Common marmoset at Aquazoo-Löbbecke-Museum, Düsseldorf

Conservation status
- Least Concern (IUCN 3.1)

Scientific classification
- Kingdom: Animalia
- Phylum: Chordata
- Class: Mammalia
- Infraclass: Placentalia
- Order: Primates
- Family: Callitrichidae
- Genus: Callithrix
- Species: C. jacchus

Binomial name
- Callithrix jacchus (Linnaeus, 1758)
- Geographic range

Synonyms
- Hapale communis South, 1845; Jacchus hapale Gray, 1870; Hapale leucotis Lesson, 1840; Jacchus albicollis Spix, 1823; Jacchus vulgaris rufus Fischer, 1829; Jacchus vulgaris Humboldt, 1812; Simia jacchus Linnaeus, 1758; Simia (Sagoinus) jacchus moschatus Kerr, 1792

= Common marmoset =

Species of New World monkey

The common marmoset (Callithrix jacchus), also called white-tufted marmoset or white-tufted-ear marmoset, is a New World monkey. It originally lived on the northeastern coast of Brazil, in the states of Piauí, Paraíba, Ceará, Rio Grande do Norte, Pernambuco, Alagoas, and Bahia. Through release (both intentional and unintentional) of captive individuals, it has expanded its range since the 1920s to Southeast Brazil (its first sighting in the wild for Rio de Janeiro was in 1929), where it became an invasive species, raising concerns about genetic pollution of similar species, such as the buffy-tufted marmoset (Callithrix aurita), and predation upon bird nestlings and eggs.

The whole genome sequence of a female common marmoset was published on 20 July 2014. It became the first New World monkey to have its genome sequenced.

== Physical description and morphology ==
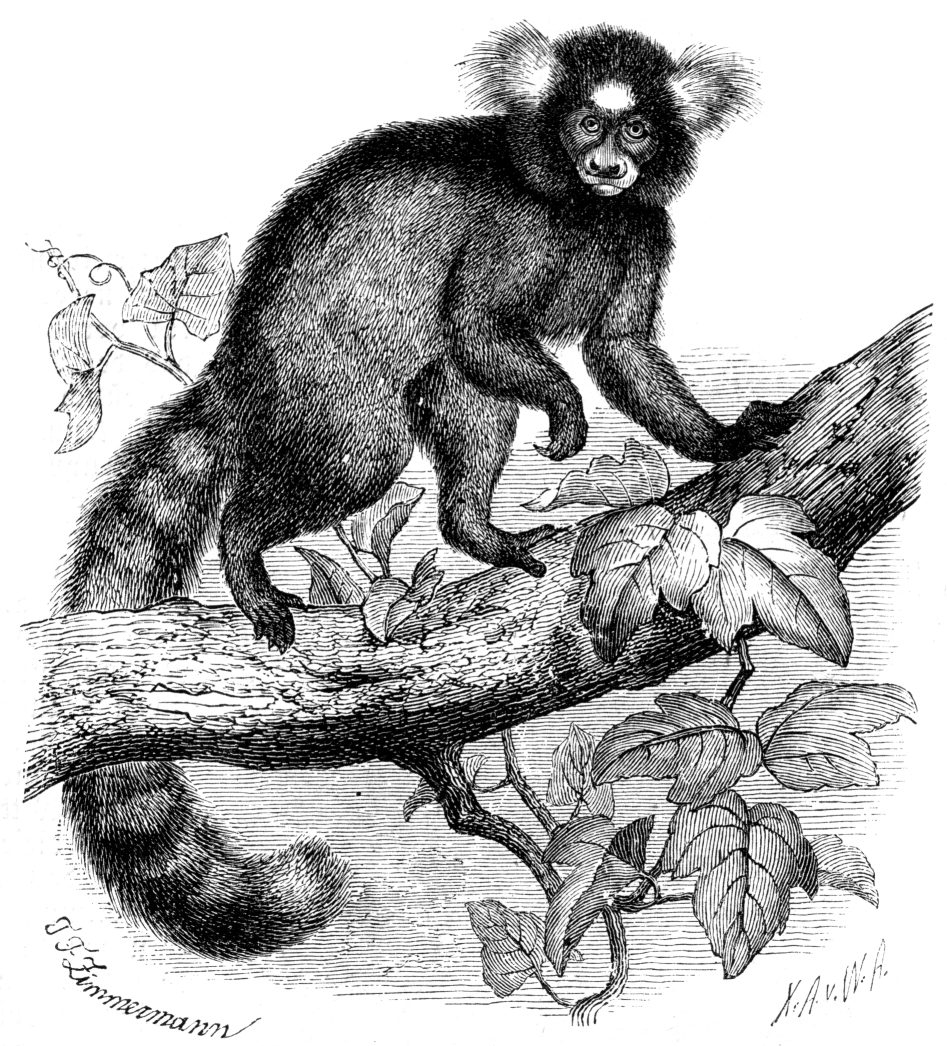
Drawing of a marmoset

Common marmosets are very small monkeys with relatively long tails. Males are slightly larger than females; males have an average height of 188 mm (7.40 in) and females have an average height of 185 mm (7.28 in). Males weigh 256 g (9.03 oz) on average and females weigh 236 g (8.32 oz) on average. The pelage of the marmoset is multicolored, being sprinkled with brown, grey, and yellow. It also has white ear tufts and the tail is banded. Its face has black across the nose-area skin and a white blaze on the forehead. The coats of infants are brown and yellow with the ear tuft developing later.

As with other members of the genus Callithrix, the common marmosets have claw-like nails known as tegulae on most of their fingers. Only their halluces (big toes) have the flat nails or ungulae that most other primates have. Marmosets have an arboreal locomotion similar to squirrels. They can hang onto trees vertically and leap between them, and run across branches quadrupedally. Tegulae are an adaptation for this type of locomotion. Other Callithrix traits shared include enlarged, chisel-shaped incisors and ceca specialized for their diet.

== Range and ecology ==
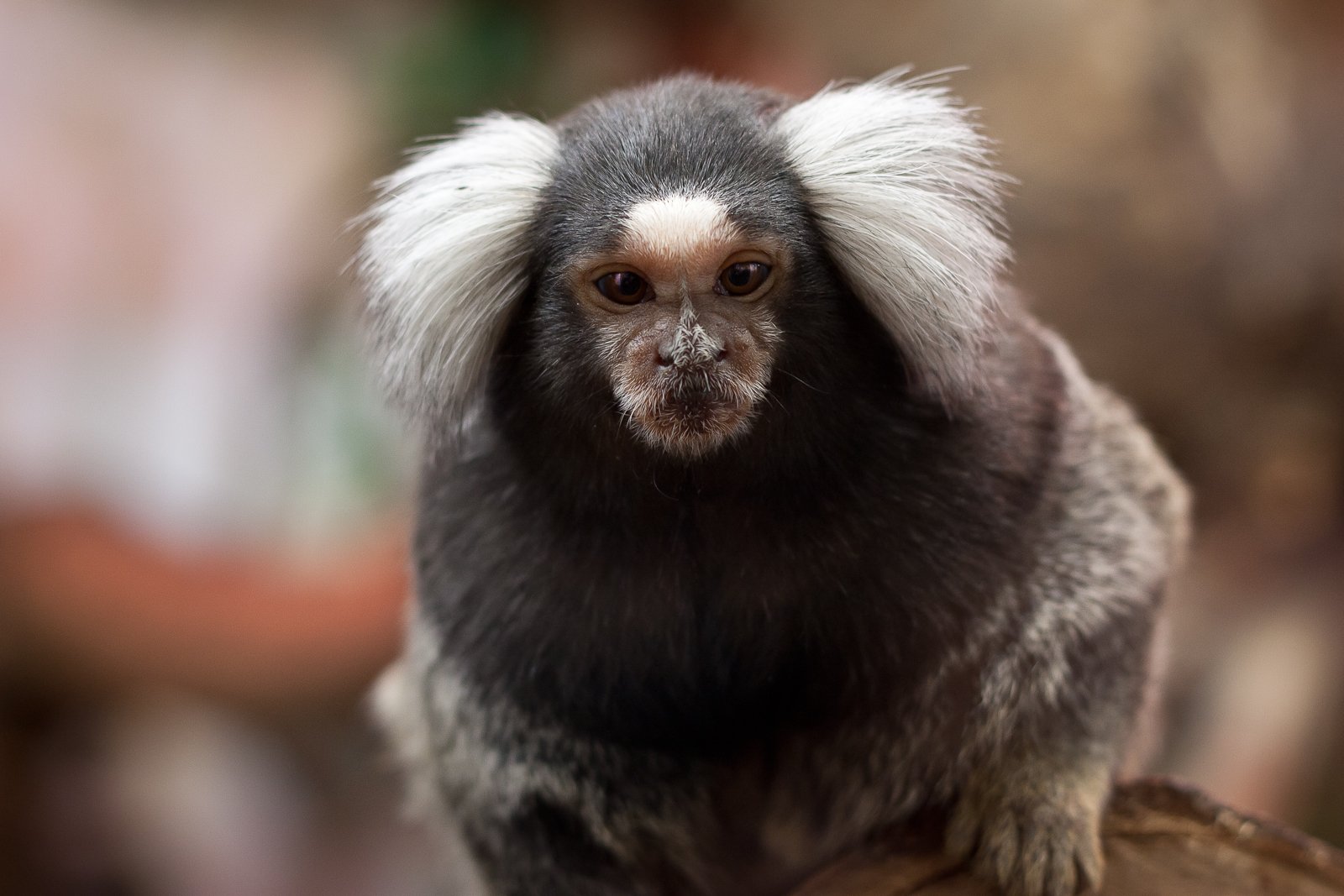
The common marmoset has white tufted ears.

Common marmosets are native only to east-central Brazil. They have been introduced into other areas and live within the cities of Rio de Janeiro and Buenos Aires, Argentina. Marmosets can be found in a number of forest habitats. They live in Atlantic coastal forests as well as semideciduous forests farther inland. They can also inhabit savanna forests and riverine forests. Marmosets are successful in dry secondary forests and edge habitats.

=== Diet ===
The common marmoset's claw-like nails, incisor shape, and gut specialization reflect their unique diet, which is primarily made of plant exudates and insects. Common marmosets feed on gum, sap, latex, and resin. They use their nails to cling to the side of a tree, and with their long lower incisors, chew a hole in the tree. The marmoset then licks up the exudates or swoops them with the teeth. From 20 to 70% of the marmoset's feeding behavior includes eating exudates.

Exudates provide marmosets with a reliable food source in their seasonal habitat. They rely on these foods particularly between January and April, when fruit is not abundant. A marmoset may visit a tree hole multiple times, including those made by other animals. In addition to exudates, insects also prove an important food source for marmosets, making up 24-30% of their food. The small size of marmosets allows them to stalk and ambush them. Marmosets also eat fruits, seeds, flowers, fungi, nectar, snails, lizards, tree frogs, bird eggs, nestlings, and infant mammals. Marmosets may compete for fruit with birds, such as parrots and toucans, and with woolly opossums.

== Behavior ==
=== Social organization ===
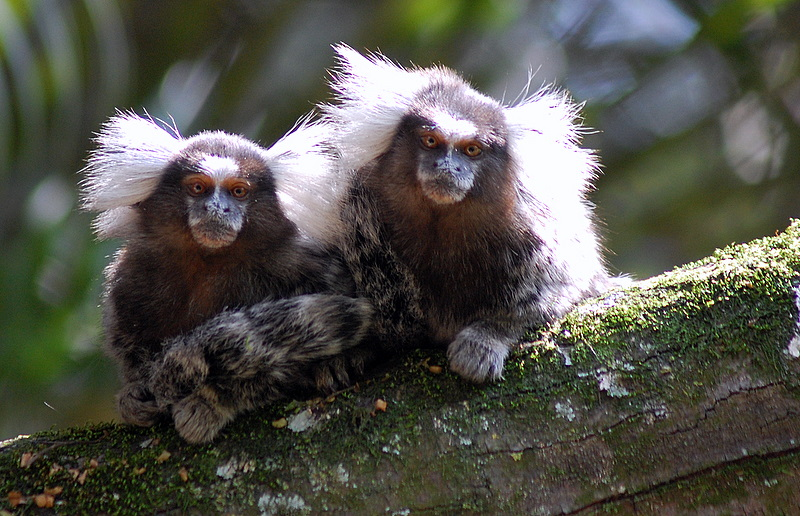
Two marmosets

Common marmosets live in stable extended families, with only a few members allowed to breed. A marmoset group can contain as many as 15 members, but a more typical number is nine. A marmoset family usually contains one or two breeding females, a breeding male, their offspring, and their adult relatives, be they their parents or siblings. The females in a group tend to be closely related, and males less so. Males do not mate with breeding females to which they are related. Marmosets may leave their natal groups when they become adults, in contrast to other primate species, which leave at adolescence. Not much is known of the reasons marmosets leave their natal groups. Family groups fuse into new groups when a breeding male dies. Within the family groups, the breeding individuals tend to be more dominant. The breeding male and female tend to share dominance. Between two breeding females, though, one is more dominant. In addition, the subordinate female is usually the daughter of the dominant one. For the other members, social rank is based on age. Dominance is maintained though various behaviors, postures, and vocalizations, and subordinates groom their superiors.

=== Reproduction and parenting ===
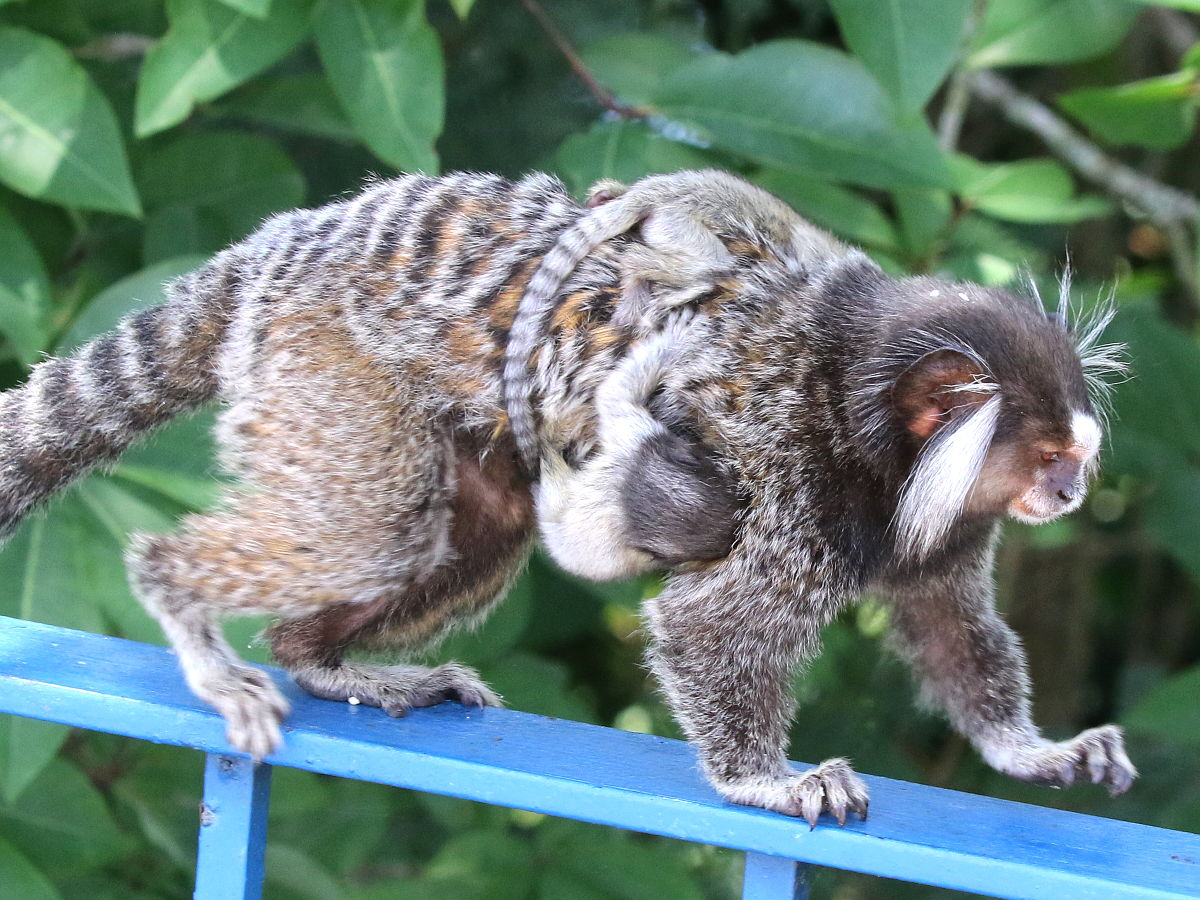
Mother and babies at Forte da Ponta da Vigia, Brazil

Common marmosets have a complex mating system. They were thought to be monogamous, but both polygamy and polyandry have been observed. Nevertheless, most matings are monogamous. Even in groups with two breeding females, the subordinate female often mates with males from other groups. Subordinate females usually do not give birth to fit offspring. Mating with extra-group males may allow the female to find potential mates in the future. Females that mate successfully but lose their young move to other groups and may gain dominant breeding positions.

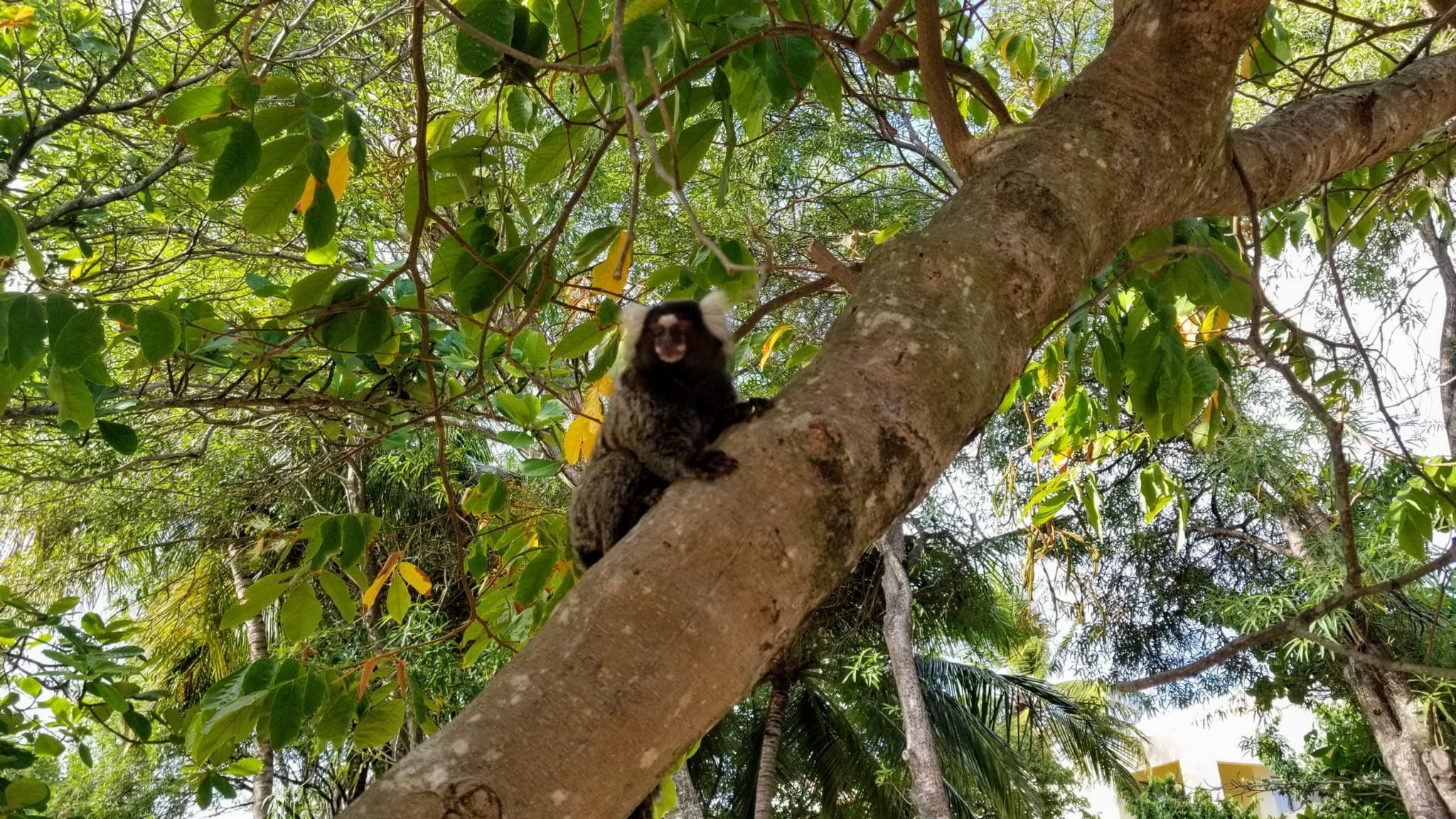
Common marmoset found in a Pernambuco resort

The breeding individuals in a group need the other members to help raise their young. Thus, the pair behaviorally and physiologically suppresses the reproduction of the other members of the group. Since these suppressed individuals are likely related to the breeding pair, they have an incentive to care for the young, as they share genes with them. In addition, the presence of a related male affects female ovulation. Female ovulation does not occur when their fathers are around, but does occur when an unrelated male is nearby, instead. They also display aggressive behavior towards their mothers, possibly to displace them.

When conditions are right for them to breed, adult females breed regularly for the rest of their lives. Females flick their tongues at males to solicit mating. The gestation period lasts for 5 months, and females are ready to breed again around 10 days after giving birth. Five months pass between each parturition, so they can give birth twice a year. Marmosets commonly give birth to nonidentical twins. Because of this, females are under stress during pregnancy and lactation, and need help from the other members of the family. Infant marmosets instinctively cling to their mother's back and do not voluntarily let go for the first two weeks. After that, they become very active and explore their environment. The breeding male (likely the father) begins handling the twins, and all members of the family care for them. In the following weeks, the young spend less time on their mother's back and more time moving around and playing. Infants are weaned at 3 months. At 5 months, they enter their juvenile stage, when they have more interactions with family members other than their parents, and rough play helps to establish their future status. Another set of infants may be born and the previous young carry and play with them. Marmosets become subadults between 9 and 14 months old, act like adults, and go through puberty. At 15 months, they reach adult size and are sexually mature, but cannot breed until they are dominant.

=== Communication ===
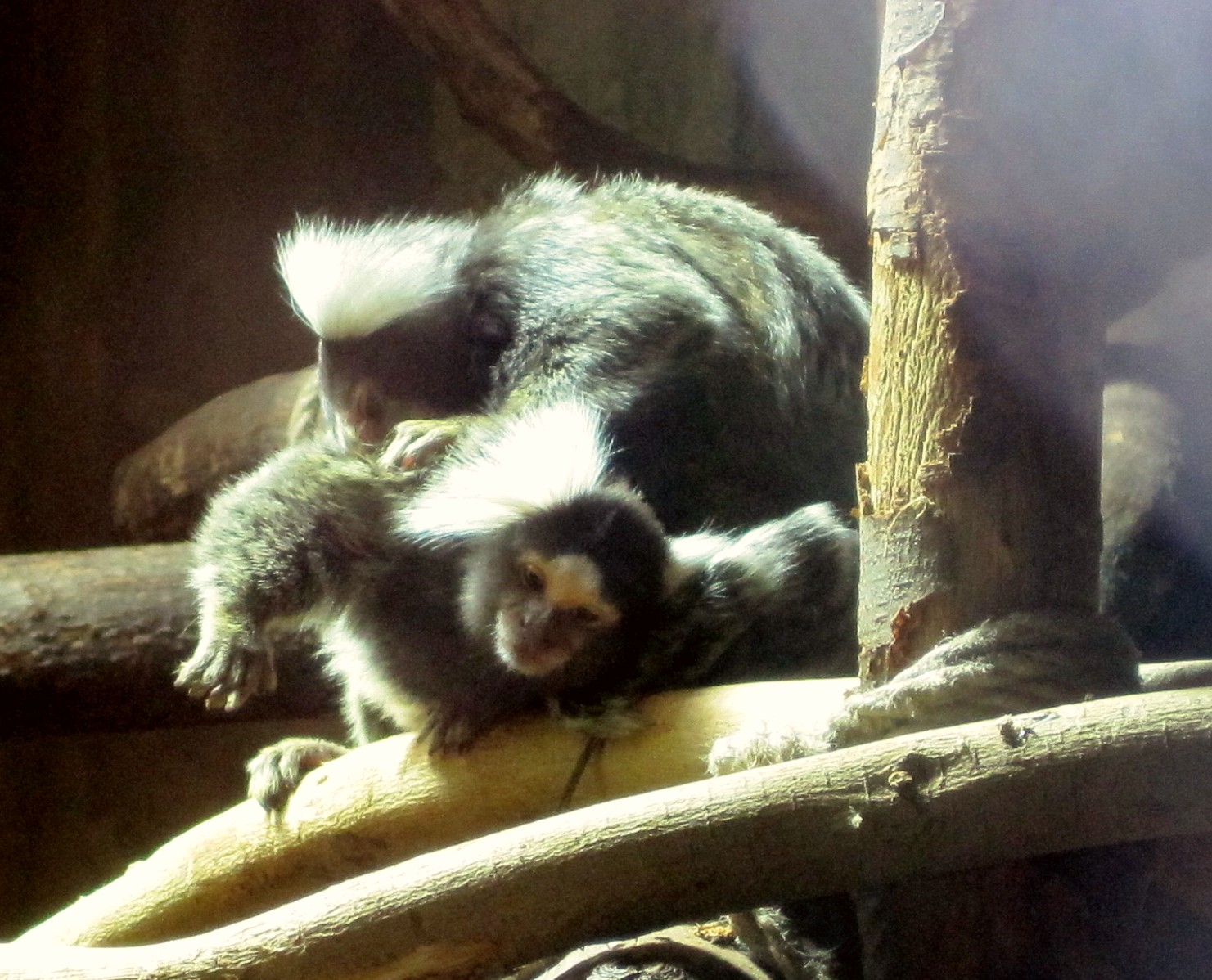
Common marmoset at the Hanover Zoo, Germany

Common marmosets employ a number of vocal and visual communications. To signal alarm, aggression, and submission, marmosets use the "partially open mouth stare", "frown", and "slit-stare", respectively. To display fear or submission, marmosets flatten their ear tufts close to their heads. Marmosets have two alarm calls - a series of repeating calls that get higher with each call, known as "staccatos", and short, trickling calls given either intermittently or repeatedly, called "tsiks". Marmoset alarm calls tend to be short and high-pitched. Marmosets monitor and locate group members with vibrato-like, low-pitched, generic calls called "trills". Marmosets also employ "phees", which are whistle-like, generic calls. These serve to attract mates, keep groups together, defend territories, and locate missing group members. Marmosets were recently found to encode the identity of the receiver in their phee calls — a behavior similar to the human use of names, and one that has been observed in only a few species: humans, dolphins, and African elephants. Marmosets use scent glands on their chests and anogenital regions to mark objects. These are meant to communicate social and reproductive status.

== Status ==
The common marmoset remains an abundant species and is not currently threatened, but its habitat had been degraded at a fast rate, with around 67% of the Cerrado region cleared for human use in the 1990s and around 80% cleared for cultivation more recently. In addition, marmosets are captured and traded as pets. Though popular as pets, they become difficult to control as they get older and may be abandoned or killed. Common marmosets have also been used for medical experiments. They are used as such in Europe more so than in the United States, and are the most common nonhuman primates to be experimented on. They are used as model organisms in areas of research such as teratology, periodontal disease, reproduction, immunology, endocrinology, obesity, and aging.

== Genome ==
In 2014, a female became the first nonhuman primate, among the New World monkeys, to have its complete genome sequenced. The genome size is 2.26 Gbp, and contains 21,168 genes. Segmental duplications added a total of 138 Mb of nonredundant sequences (4.7% of the whole genome), slightly fewer than observed in humans or chimpanzees (about 5%), but more than in orangutans (3.8%).
