= Brown blotch disease =

Mushroom disease

Brown blotch disease is a bacterial infection that affects nearly every species of mushroom. The infecting bacteria, Pseudomonas tolaasii, produces the toxin tolaasin that causes brown spots to cover the surface of the mushroom. Brown blotch disease is especially problematic on common mushroom farms, where it can spread quickly and cause huge economic losses.

== Symptoms ==
Agaricus bisporus, or the cultivated mushroom, is the primary victim of brown blotch disease. The most common symptom of brown blotch disease in A. bisporus is the formation of round lesions on the cap and stalk of the mushroom. As the disease progresses, these lesions go from a pale yellow to a dark brown and cause the quick deterioration of mushrooms after harvest. Any external growth such as the fruit bodies (spore-producing structures) formed by infected mushrooms are completely brown. In minor cases of brown blotch disease, there are a few brown spots on the cap or stalk of the mushroom. In major cases, many spots blend together and turn all of the surfaces brown.

Symptoms can arise at any stage of the mushrooms development cycle, including during post-harvest storage. Symptoms usually appear after a long, wet period on the cap of the mushroom caused by condensation from spraying. These are the optimal conditions for the causal agent of the disease to thrive.

== Causal Agent ==
Brown blotch disease is caused by the colonization of Pseudomonas tolaasii bacteria on the surface of a mushroom. P. tolaasii favors moist conditions, such as within water droplets or a high relative humidity. However, P. tolaasii is able to survive in a variety of environmental conditions and successfully compete with other bacterium populations due to several biological mechanisms, such as its ability to switch between a smooth and rough phenotypic strain. In optimal conditions, the P. tolaasii population undergoes exponential growth and also increases the production of the toxin tolaasin.

Tolaasin disrupts the plasma membranes of mushroom cells, causing their subsequent collapse. Tolaasin does not only affect the surface of the mushroom. When secreted, it can also infiltrate deeper hypha tissues within the mushroom. Tolaasin is also an effective biosurfactant, which means that its presence decreases the surface tension of water. Lower surface tension causes water to spread over a larger area, enabling P. tolaasii to colonize fresh areas of the mushroom cap.

The process of infection is as follows: P. tolaasii is splashed onto the surface of a mushroom, senses the mushroom's surface, migrates towards it, and releases tolaasin in order to compromise the plasma membrane of the mushroom cells and access the nutrients within.

=== Spread ===
Brown blotch disease spreads quickly on mushroom farms due to the close proximity of mushrooms and favorable conditions caused by regular irrigation. One way for P. tolaasii to spread is simply from one mushroom to another at the contact points between caps of adjacent mushrooms. This is why beginning symptoms are commonly seen on the edges of caps. The infection can also spread by airborne dust, splashing during watering, the tools of farmworkers, nematodes and mushroom flies.

P. tolaasii is initially introduced to mushroom farms due to its presence in the soil. The bacterium's versatility allows it to survive the various purification and cleaning processes the soil goes through before use.

=== Identification ===
P. tolaasii presence in soil is unfavorable to mushroom farmers, so a test was created to detect its presence. This is called the “white line test." The unknown bacteria is placed in a line on one side of a dish and P. reactans is placed a few millimeters parallel to it. The dish is incubated at 25 °C for 48 hours. If at the end of the 48 hours there is a line of white precipitate between the two bacterium populations, then the unknown bacterium is P. tolaasii. The line of white precipitate forms due to a reaction between tolaasin and a compound produced by P. reactans known as the white line-inducing principle (WLIP). The white line test can help detect P. tolaasii in soil and prevent its spread on mushroom farms.

== Prevention ==
To prevent the spread of brown blotch disease on mushroom farms, various disinfectants and antibiotics have been used, but none are fully effective and nontoxic to humans. Chlorinated compounds such as sodium hypochlorite are also used, but in moist conditions the growth rate of P. tolaasii populations neutralize the effects of the compounds. Therefore, the solution to brown blotch disease is thought to be biological.

Bacteriophages have been used, but strains of P. tolaasii that are immune to such viruses have already been identified.

Introducing an antagonistic bacterium such as P. reactans, which forms the white line-inducing principle that neutralizes tolaasin, was also seen as a possible solution. However, WLIP only proved effective at high concentrations.

Brown mushrooms are naturally more resistant to the brown blotch disease than their white counterparts, so genetically engineering a more resistant A.bisporus is being researched. The exact gene that enables this resistance has not yet been identified.

One final possible biological solution is to introduce a strain of P. tolaasii without the tolaasin-producing gene to act as a competitor. This method has not been tested.

Research indicates that the incubation of harvested mushrooms at low temperatures for four days inhibited the browning symptom, but this method has not yet been tested at a large scale.

== Importance ==
Brown blotch disease is the most common disease of cultivated mushrooms. Consumers prefer mushrooms to be completely white, so brown blotch disease causes large economic losses due to a perceived decrease in quality, even though it does not cause any health problems in humans.

Brown blotch disease is observed in mushroom farms all over the world. In the UK, the Netherlands and France, 15% of the crop weight is affected by brown blotch disease, while in Italy it is even worse; in the worst years, 40% of the total weight of mushroom crops is affected by brown blotch disease in Italy. Because brown blotch disease affects all mushroom species, exotic mushrooms grown in eastern countries such as Japan, China, and India are also affected.
