= Cheilotheca =

Scientific classification
- Kingdom: Plantae
- Clade: Tracheophytes
- Clade: Angiosperms
- Clade: Eudicots
- Clade: Asterids
- Order: Ericales
- Family: Ericaceae
- Subfamily: Monotropoideae
- Tribe: Monotropeae
- Genus: Cheilotheca; Hook.f.

Genus of flowering plants in the heath family

Cheilotheca is a small genus of myco-heterotrophic plants in the family Ericaceae. They obtain their nutrients by parasitising fungi in the Russulaceae family. As of 2025, the genus includes four species.

== Etymology ==
The genus was named by Joseph Dalton Hooker in 1876. The name is derived from the Greek word "cheilos", meaning a lip or an edge. The "theca" is a Latin term, meaning covering or sheath. Together they essentially mean "lipped sheath".

== Taxonomy ==
Based on morphological analyses, Cheilotheca has been placed in the Ericaceae subfamily Monotropoideae. The exact placement of Cheilotheca within the Monotropoideae is still unknown, but morphologically the genus most closely resembles Monotropa and Monotropastrum.

== List of species ==
- Cheilotheca crocea L.Wu & Yan Liu
- Cheilotheca khasiana Hook.f.
- Cheilotheca malayana Scort. ex Hook.f.
- Cheilotheca sleumerana H.Keng

Cheilotheca macrocarpa is sometimes included in this genus as well; it is synonymous with Monotropastrum humile.
