= Heinrich Andres =

German botanist and pteridologist (1883–1970)

Heinrich Andres (5 May 1883 in Bengel – 11 August 1970 in Bonn) was a German educator and botanist known for his investigations of Rhineland flora.

Up until 1910 he was a schoolteacher in the town of Hetzhof, afterwards teaching classes in Bonn. He was the taxonomic authority of the genera Monotropastrum and Monotropanthum as well as of numerous species within the plant family Ericaceae. In 1967 Hermann Otto Sleumer dedicated the genus Andresia in his honor.

== Selected works ==
- Die Pirolaceen des rheinischen Schiefergebirges, 1906 – Pirolaceae of the Rhenish Massif.
- Flora von Eifel und Hunsrück, 1911 – Flora of Eifel and Hunsrück.
- Flora des mittelrheinischen Berglandes und der eingeschlossenen Flusstäler, 1920 – Flora of the mid-Rhine mountain country and associated enclosed river valleys .
- Die Pflanzenwelt unserer Heimat: kurze Anleitung zum Bestimmen der höheren Pflanzen (Blütenpflanzen und Farne), 1925 – Flora of our country: a brief guide to the determination of higher plants (flowering plants and ferns).

Andres published the exsiccata series Dr. phil. Wirtgen: Herbarium plantae criticae, selectae, hybridae florae Rhenanae, editio nova (1928-1933).
