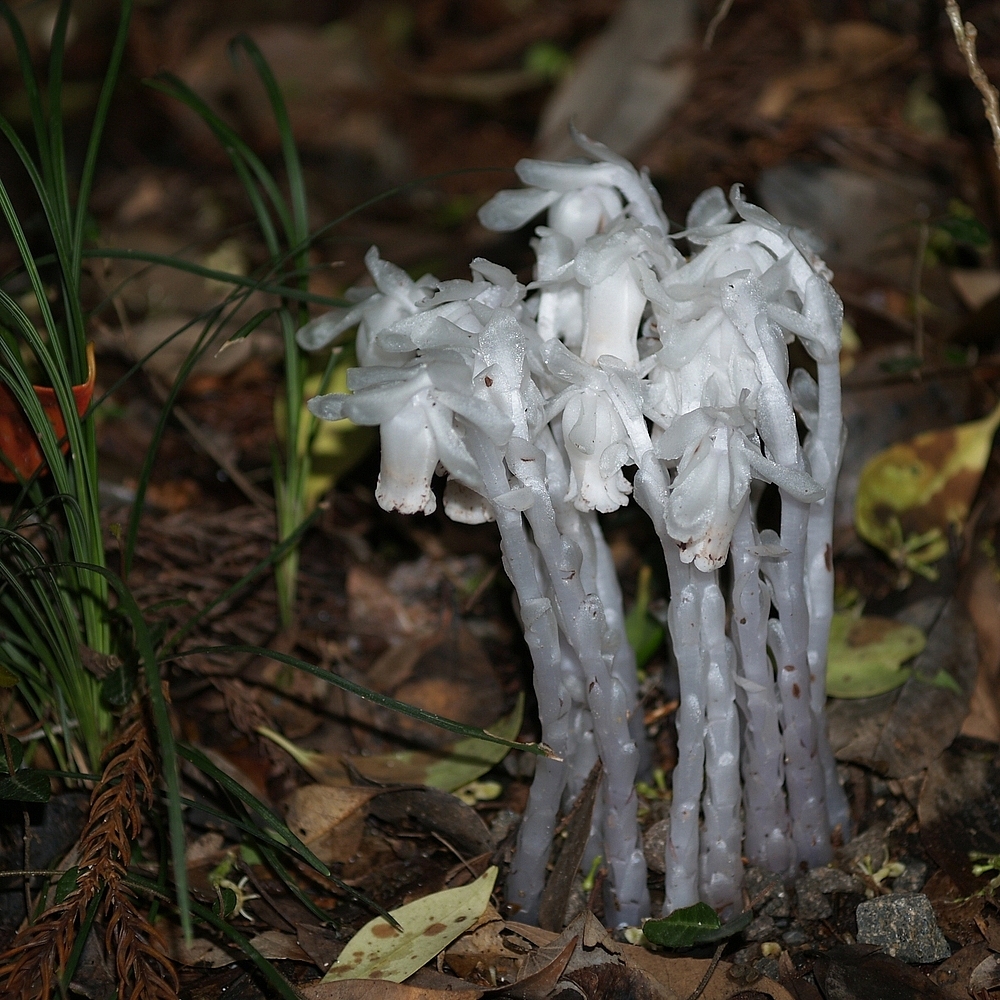

Scientific classification
- Kingdom: Plantae
- Clade: Tracheophytes
- Clade: Angiosperms
- Clade: Eudicots
- Clade: Asterids
- Order: Ericales
- Family: Ericaceae
- Genus: Monotropastrum
- Species: M. humile

Binomial name
- Monotropastrum humile (D.Don) H.Hara

= Monotropastrum humile =

Species of flowering plant

Monotropastrum humile is a species of myco-heterotrophic plant of the family Ericaceae, distributed throughout eastern Asia, from the Himalayas to the Islands of Japan.

It lacks chlorophyll and is therefore unable to perform photosynthesis as most plants do; instead it gains sugars and nutrients from mycorrhizal fungi.

It is sometimes referred to as Cheilotheca macrocarpa.
