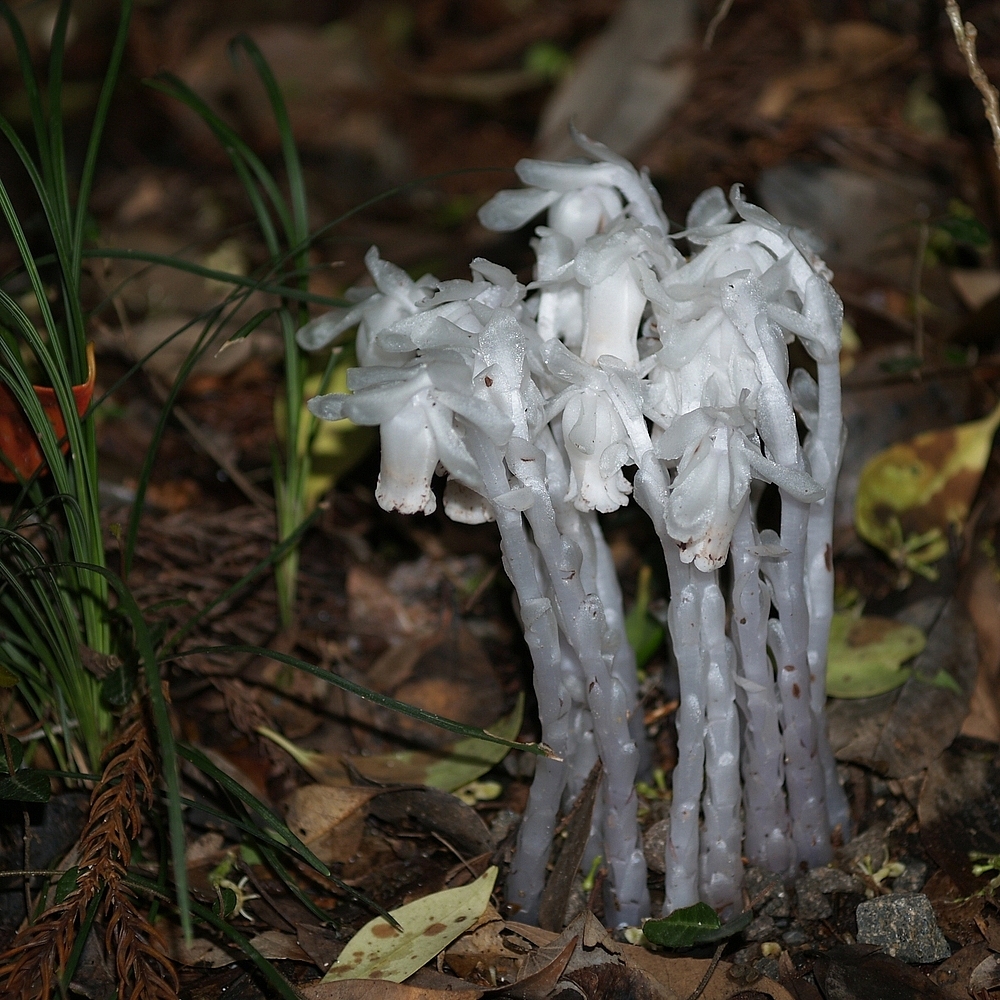
- Monotropastrum humile

Scientific classification
- Kingdom: Plantae
- Clade: Tracheophytes
- Clade: Angiosperms
- Clade: Eudicots
- Clade: Asterids
- Order: Ericales
- Family: Ericaceae
- Subfamily: Monotropoideae
- Tribe: Monotropeae
- Genus: Monotropastrum; Andres

= Monotropastrum =

Genus of flowering plants

Monotropastrum is a small genus of myco-heterotrophic plants in the family Ericaceae. As currently circumscribed the group includes three species.

== Distribution ==
The genus is found locally throughout much of southern and eastern Asia (Bhutan, China, India, Indonesia, Japan, Korea, Laos, Myanmar, Nepal, Russia, Sikkim, Thailand, and Vietnam).

== Taxonomy ==
Based on morphological and molecular analyses, Monotropastrum has been placed in the Ericaceae subfamily Monotropoideae, and the tribe Monotropeae.

== List of species ==
- Monotropastrum humile (D.Don) H.Hara
- Monotropastrum sciaphilum (Andres) G.D. Wallace
- Monotropastrum kirishimense (Suetsugu) K. Suetsugu
