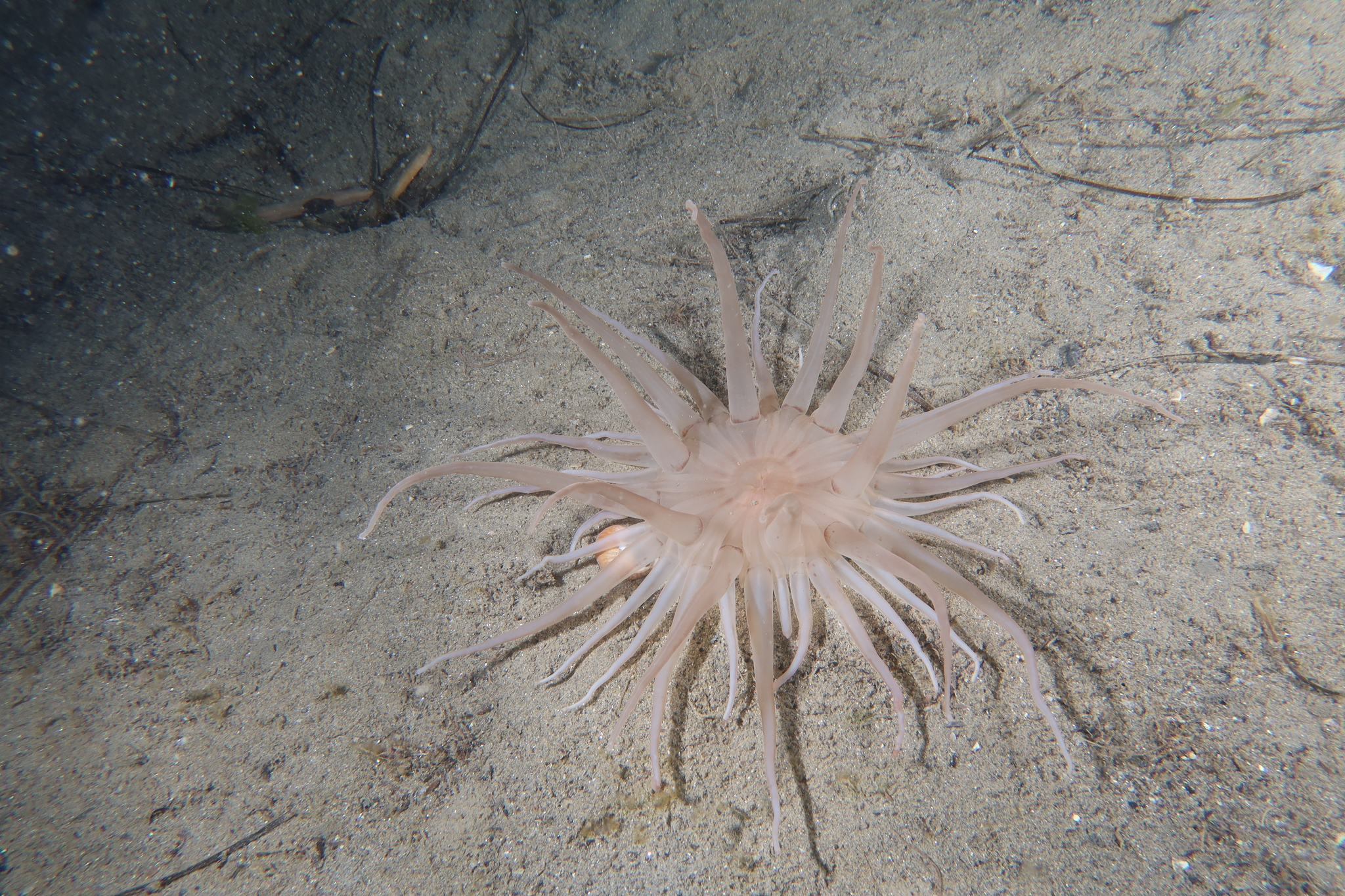

Conservation status
- Data Deficient (IUCN 3.1) (Mediterranean)

Scientific classification
- Kingdom: Animalia
- Phylum: Cnidaria
- Subphylum: Anthozoa
- Class: Hexacorallia
- Order: Actiniaria
- Family: Andresiidae
- Genus: Andresia; Stephenson, 1921
- Species: A. partenopea

Binomial name
- Andresia partenopea (Andrès, 1883)

= Andresia partenopea =

Species of sea anemone

Andresia is a monotypic genus of cnidarians belonging to the family Andresiidae. The only species is Andresia partenopea.

The species is found in Western Europe.
