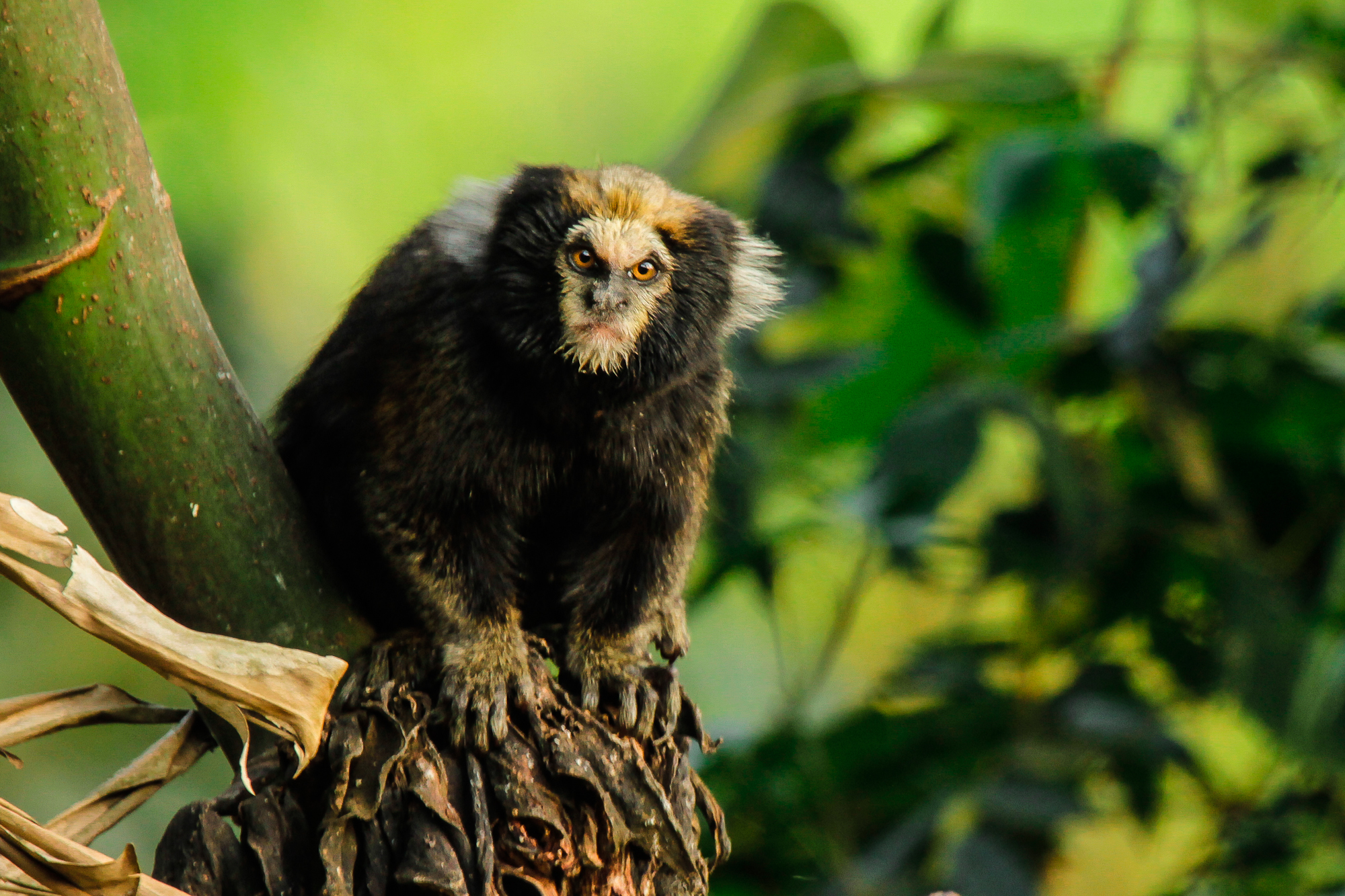

Conservation status
- Endangered (IUCN 3.1)
- CITES Appendix I

Scientific classification
- Kingdom: Animalia
- Phylum: Chordata
- Class: Mammalia
- Infraclass: Placentalia
- Order: Primates
- Family: Callitrichidae
- Genus: Callithrix
- Species: C. aurita

Binomial name
- Callithrix aurita (É. Geoffroy, 1812)

Synonyms
- chrysopyga Burmeister, 1854; coelestis Miranda Ribeiro, 1924; itatiayae Avila-Pires, 1959; petronius Miranda Ribeiro, 1924

= Buffy-tufted marmoset =

Species of New World monkey

The buffy-tufted marmoset (Callithrix aurita), also known as the buffy tufted-ear marmoset or white-eared marmoset, is a New World monkey that lives in the forests on the Atlantic coast of southeast Brazil. Of all the marmosets, it has the southernmost range.

The buffy-tufted marmoset resembles the common marmoset, but is somewhat larger. It has grey-black skin, and the most obvious differences from the common marmoset are its whitish face ("skull-like facial mask",) brown crown, and shorter ear tufts.

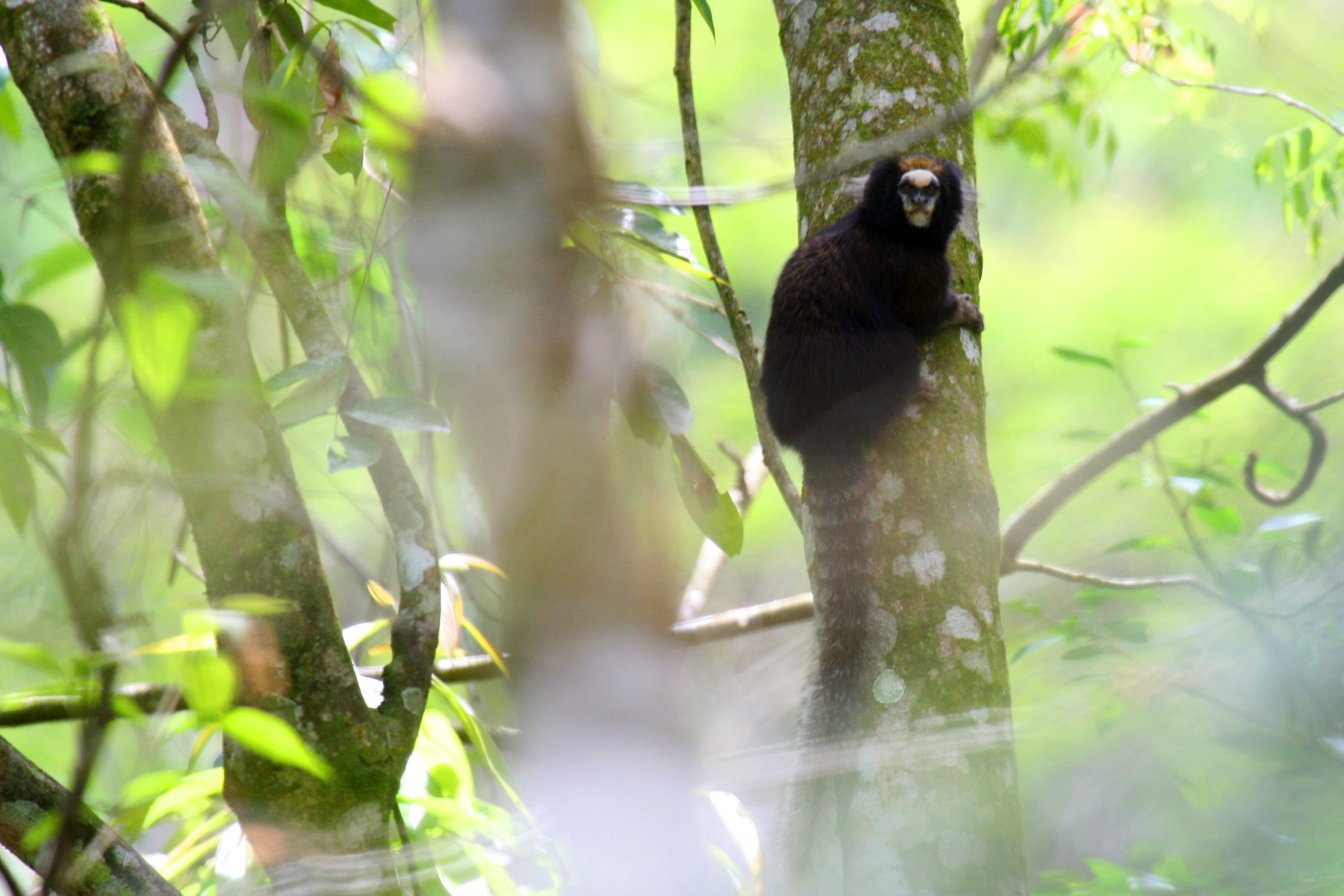
The Buffy-tufted marmoset is a species threatened of extinction due to the high level of deforestation in the Atlantic Forest.

== Distribution ==
The buffy-tufted marmoset is endemic to the Atlantic Forest of southern Brazil, occurring in ombrophilous and semideciduous forests in the Serras do Mar and Mantiqueira in the states of Minas Gerais, São Paulo, and Rio de Janeiro, and extending to the North of Rio Doce in Minas Gerais. They forage and travel in the lower canopy and dense understorey vegetation, typically found between 6 and 9 meters above the ground. Alongside C. flaviceps, they are the species inhabiting areas with the most extreme climatic conditions.

It occurs in perennial, semideciduous, secondary, mixed montane forests, interspersed with stands of bamboo at altitudes ranging from 80 to 1200 meters.

== Morphology ==
It has an overall black coloration, but they can also be found with reddish spots or speckled with red, without presenting a general pattern of stripes. Moreover, its reddish spots provide the characteristic golden hue that gave rise to the species' name "aurita". Its forehead is white, with the sides of the face being black, sometimes speckled with red. They have short (20 to 50 mm), white intra-auricular tufts that can vary to a brownish hue. The feet are brown, and the hands are a strongly weathered brown color. The tail is black with white rings.

It is probably the largest species in the Callithrix genus, weighing 400–450 g and with a body length of 19–25 cm and a tail length of 27–35 cm.

== Ecology ==
It is diurnal and arboreal, living almost all its life in the trees in groups that usually consist of 4 to 8 individuals, although it's possible to find groups of 11 individuals, with only one reproductive pair of male and female, with a dominant female. The offspring, always twins, are born after a gestation period of 144 days and are carried by the parents in the first weeks of life. Older siblings assist in caring for the offspring. When they reach adulthood, they migrate to other groups to form new pairs. Their activity period is reduced during hot-dry times. During the rainy season - 6:30-19:00 / dry season - 7:30-16:30. Their resting sites are associated with dense vegetation.

They feed on resins and other plant secretions, as well as plant material itself, such as fruits and tree gum. During dry periods, they adapt their diet to include animal matter, such as lepidoptera larvae, orthopterans, cockroaches, spiders, harvestmen, snakes, lizards, small frogs and bird eggs. Studies also show that this species can feed on bamboo fungi.

It can establish sympatry with other species like those of the genus Cebus and Callicebus, but there are no records of sympatry with other forms of Callithrix.

== Conservation ==
This species is present on the list of endangered species in the mentioned states where it occurs, as well as on the Brazilian and global lists. Its restricted distribution, habitat destruction, population decline, competition with other species, and hybridization due to the introduction of invasive exotic species (Callithrix jacchus and C. penicillata) are among the main threats.

== Predation ==
Predators of buffy-tufted marmosets include pit vipers (Bothrops jararaca).
