= Tolaasin =

Bacterial toxins

Tolaasin, a non-host specific toxin secreted by the bacterium Pseudomonas tolaasii, is the cause of bacterial brown blotch disease of edible mushrooms. Tolaasin is composed of 18 amino acids and has a beta-hydroxy-octanoic acid chain located at the N terminus. In addition to forming an amphipathic left handed alpha-helix in a hydrophobic environment, the toxin has been shown to form Zn^{2+}-sensitive voltage-gated ion channels in planar lipid bilayers and to catalyze erythrocyte lysis by a colloid osmotic mechanism. At high concentrations, tolaasin acts as a detergent that is able to directly dissolve eukaryotic membranes. The fungal cell membranes are disrupted by the lipopeptides through the formation of trans-membrane pores. Tolaasin pores disrupt the cellular osmotic pressure, leading to membrane collapse. Compounds that inhibit the toxicity of tolaasin have been identified from varying food additives. Tolaasin cytotoxicity can be effectively inhibited by food detergents, as well as sucrose and polyglycerol esters of fatty acids.
