= Pseudomonas tolaasii =

Scientific classification
- Domain: Bacteria
- Kingdom: Pseudomonadati
- Phylum: Pseudomonadota
- Class: Gammaproteobacteria
- Order: Pseudomonadales
- Family: Pseudomonadaceae
- Genus: Pseudomonas
- Species: P. tolaasii

Binomial name
- Pseudomonas tolaasii Paine 1919

Type strain
- ATCC 33618 CCUG 23369 and 32782; CFBP 2068; CIP 106735; ICMP 12883; JCM 21583; LMG 2342; NCPPB 2192

Species of bacterium

Pseudomonas tolaasii is one of a complex of Pseudomonas species that acts as the causal agent of bacterial blotch in white button mushrooms (Agaricus bisporus). It is known to produce a toxin, called tolaasin, which is responsible for the brown blotches associated with the disease. It also demonstrates hemolytic activity, causing lysis of erythrocytes. Based on 16S rRNA analysis, P. tolaasii has been placed in the P. fluorescens group.
