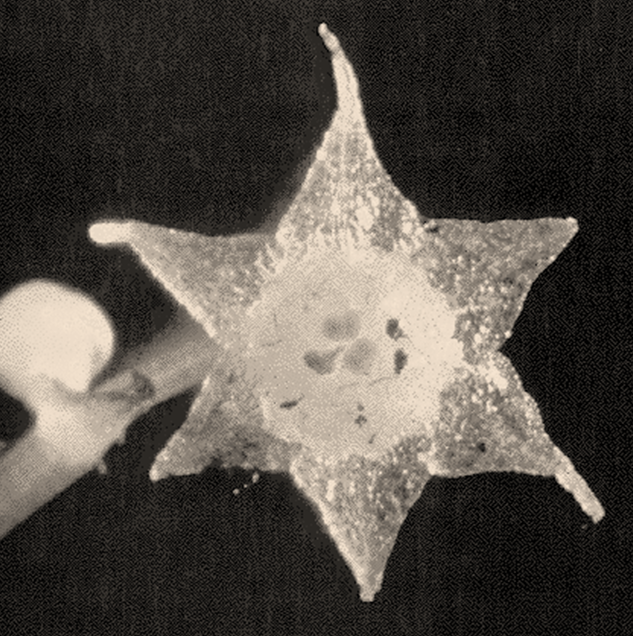
- Flower of Lacandonia schismatica

Scientific classification
- Kingdom: Plantae
- Clade: Tracheophytes
- Clade: Angiosperms
- Clade: Monocots
- Order: Pandanales
- Family: Triuridaceae
- Genus: Lacandonia; E.Martínez & Ramos

= Lacandonia =

Genus of flowering plants

Lacandonia is a mycoheterotrophic plant that contains no chlorophyll and has the unusual characteristic of inverted positions of the male (androecium) and female (gynoecium) floral parts, something that had not been seen in any other plants, with the exceptions of Trithuria and on occasion the related Triuris brevistylis.

== Description ==
Lacandonia is a small, mycoheterotrophic plant that lacks chlorophyll and has a rhizomatous growth pattern. This genus exhibits racemous inflorescences and small, bract-like leaves. The flowers are actinomorphic and are considered "inverted" from the typical flower arrangement–usually 3 (but sometimes two to four) male stamens are in the center of the flower, surrounded by 60 to 80 female pistils. This characteristic, where the positions of the androecium and the gynoecium are reversed, is unique in the known and described taxa of the flowering plants.

Flowers of Lacandonia are bisexual; they self-pollinate and fertilize before the flower opens (preanthesis cleistogamy). They are true flowers, as opposed to pseudanthia, as had been suggested earlier in the literature. The three-celled pollen grains germinate within the anthers and the pollen tube grows through the receptacle to reach the ovaries. L. schismatica can be found flowering year-round when its environment is moist enough, with a particularly active flowering period in November and December. Owing to the preathesis cleistogamy, a form of autogamy (self-pollination), the known population of L. schismatica lacks genetic variability and has a high incidence of homozygosity. The haploid chromosome number of this species is n = 9.

== Taxonomy and botanical history ==
Lacandonia is a genus of mycoheterotrophic plants in the Triuridaceae, with very unusual inverted floral morphology. It has two known species:

- Lacandonia schismatica E.Martínez & Ramos 1989 - Chiapas in Mexico
- Lacandonia brasiliana A.Melo & M.Alves 2012 - Paraíba in Brazil

Lacandonia schismatica was first described by Martínez and Clara Hilda Ramos in 1989, who placed the species in its own family, Lacandoniaceae, which itself was placed in the Triuridales. In 1991, Traudel Rübsamen-Weustenfeld suggested that L. schismatica be included in the family Triuridaceae within the genus Sciaphila, Peltophyllum, or its own genus. Another study in 1998 presented data that supports the separation of L. schismatica into its own family. The APG II system transferred the genus to the Triuridaceae and placed that family in the Pandanales. Lacandonia was long considered monotypic, until the discovery of a second species, Lacandonia brasiliana, in Guaribas Biological Reserve in Brazil in 2012.

== Evolution ==
The difficulty expressed in placing the species in the proper family is due to the unique floral morphology. How this inverted position of the androecium and gynoecium evolved is unknown, but some studies have posed hypotheses. Davidse and Martínez suggested that L. schismatica could be one of Richard Goldschmidt's "hopeful monsters", meaning that the inverted floral morphology could have arisen from a macromutation in the genes that control floral development. It is also possible that chromosomal repatterning was the origin of this species.

Since the original description and early work on this species in the 1990s, other field work has revealed some instances of L. schismatica flowers that were unisexual. The closely related species Triuris brevistylis was discovered to be mostly dioecious, but a few individuals were located that had bisexual flowers, with the flower arrangement inverted, in the same way as that of L. schismatica flowers. This discovery led the authors of the study to conclude that the inverted floral morphology evolved before L. schismatica and T. brevistylis diverged. Isolated populations during the Quaternary Period (around five million years ago), when temperatures in the Lacandon lowland rainforest were six to eight °C (10.8 to 14.4 °F) cooler than today. This hypothesis is supported by the geographic distribution, in which L. schismatica is restricted to the warmer lowlands and T. brevistylis has a distribution in the cooler highlands.
