= Sciaphila secundiflora =

Scientific classification
- Kingdom: Plantae
- Clade: Tracheophytes
- Clade: Angiosperms
- Clade: Monocots
- Order: Pandanales
- Family: Triuridaceae
- Genus: Sciaphila
- Species: S. secundiflora

Binomial name
- Sciaphila secundiflora Thwaites ex Benth.

Species of plant

Sciaphila secundiflora is a herb in the family Triuridaceae and native to southern Asia, Japan and the East Indies. T. secundiflora differs from all other Monocots in having female flowers with ten tepals and male flowers with eight tepals. It is a saprophyte. The flowers are purple and in globular clusters.
