= Sciaphila yakushimensis =

Scientific classification
- Kingdom: Plantae
- Clade: Tracheophytes
- Clade: Angiosperms
- Clade: Monocots
- Order: Pandanales
- Family: Triuridaceae
- Genus: Sciaphila
- Species: S. yakushimensis

Binomial name
- Sciaphila yakushimensis Suetsugu

Species of flowering plant

Sciaphila yakushimensis is a flowering plant in the family Triuridaceae found in Japan, at an elevation of 150 meters. It is a myco-heterotroph, meaning it parasitises fungi to gain nutrients instead of undergoing photosynthesis.

== Description ==
The stem of S. yakushimensis grows to between 3 and 9 cm tall, 0.6 mm thick. Pedicels are 2-5 mm long, and flowers are 1.5 mm across.
