= Stamen =

Male reproductive organs of a flower

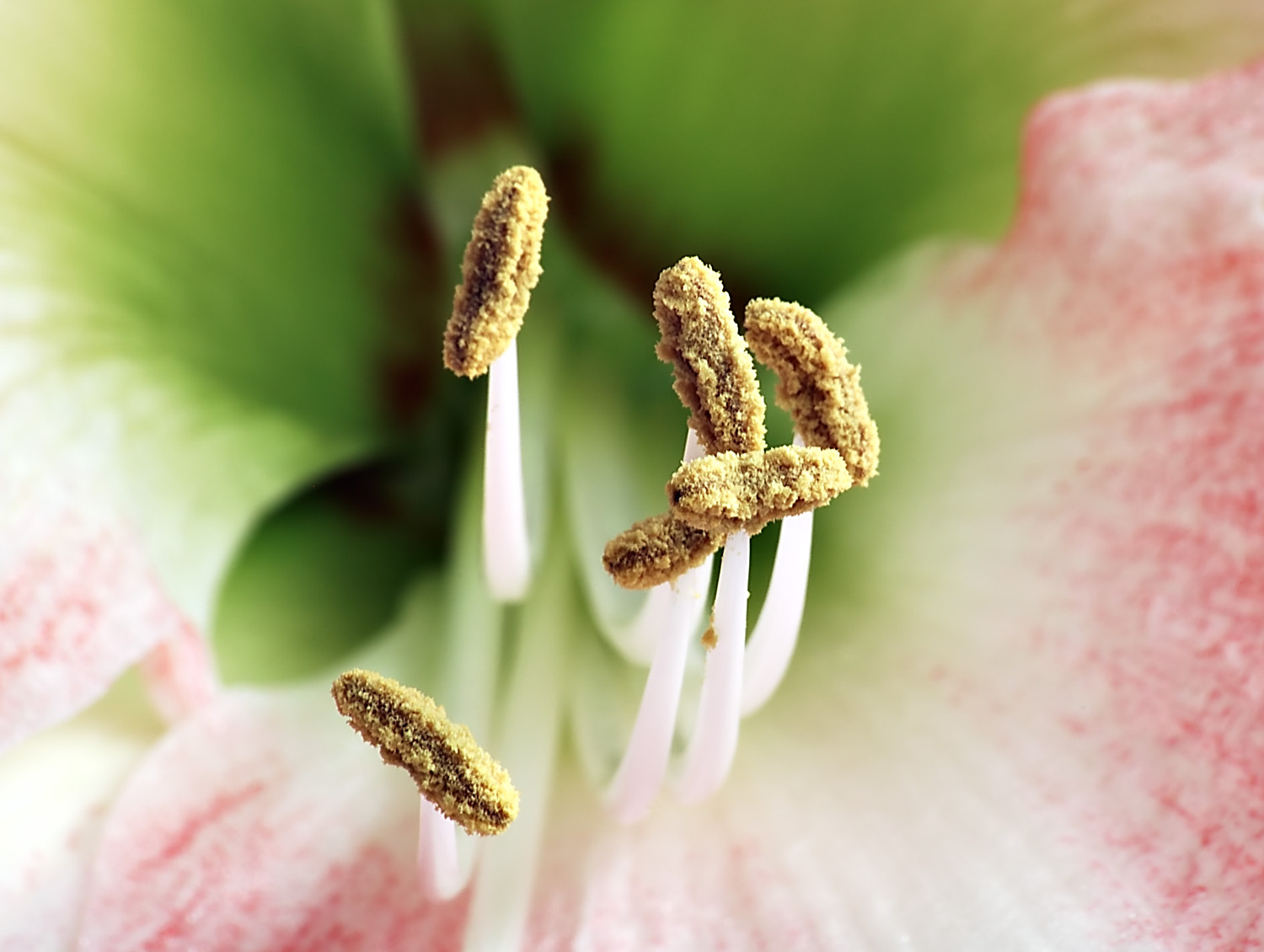
Stamens of a Hippeastrum with white filaments and prominent anthers carrying pollen

The stamen (pl.: stamina or stamens) is a part consisting of the male reproductive organs of a flower. Collectively, the stamens form the androecium.

== Morphology and terminology ==
Diagram of stamen

A stamen typically consists of a stalk called the filament and an anther which contains microsporangia. Most commonly, anthers are two-lobed (each lobe is termed a locule) and are attached to the filament either at the base or in the middle area of the anther. The sterile (i.e. nonreproductive) tissue between the lobes is called the connective, an extension of the filament containing conducting strands. It can be seen as an extension on the dorsal side of the anther. A pollen grain develops from a microspore in the microsporangium and contains the male gametophyte. The size of anthers differs greatly, from a tiny fraction of a millimeter in Wolfia spp up to five inches (13 centimeters) in Canna iridiflora and Strelitzia nicolai.

The stamens in a flower are collectively called the androecium. The androecium can consist of as few as one-half stamen (i.e. a single locule) as in Canna species or as many as 3,482 stamens which have been counted in the saguaro cactus (Carnegiea gigantea). The androecium in various species of plants forms a great variety of patterns, some of them highly complex. It generally surrounds the gynoecium and is surrounded by the perianth. A few members of the family Triuridaceae, particularly Lacandonia schismatica and Lacandonia brasiliana, along with a few species of Trithuria (family Hydatellaceae) are exceptional in that their gynoecia surround their androecia.

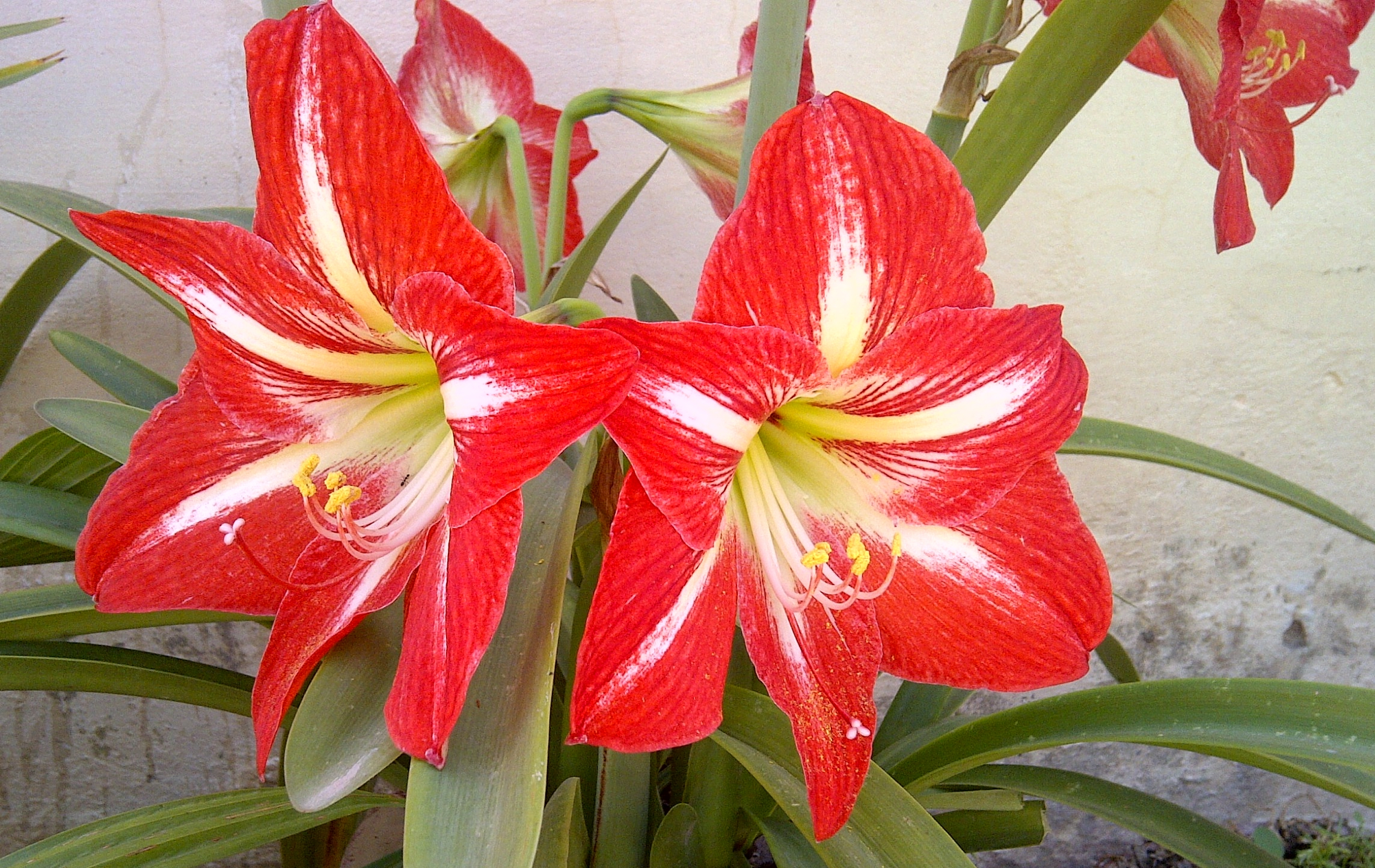
Hippeastrum flowers showing stamens above the style (with its terminal stigma)

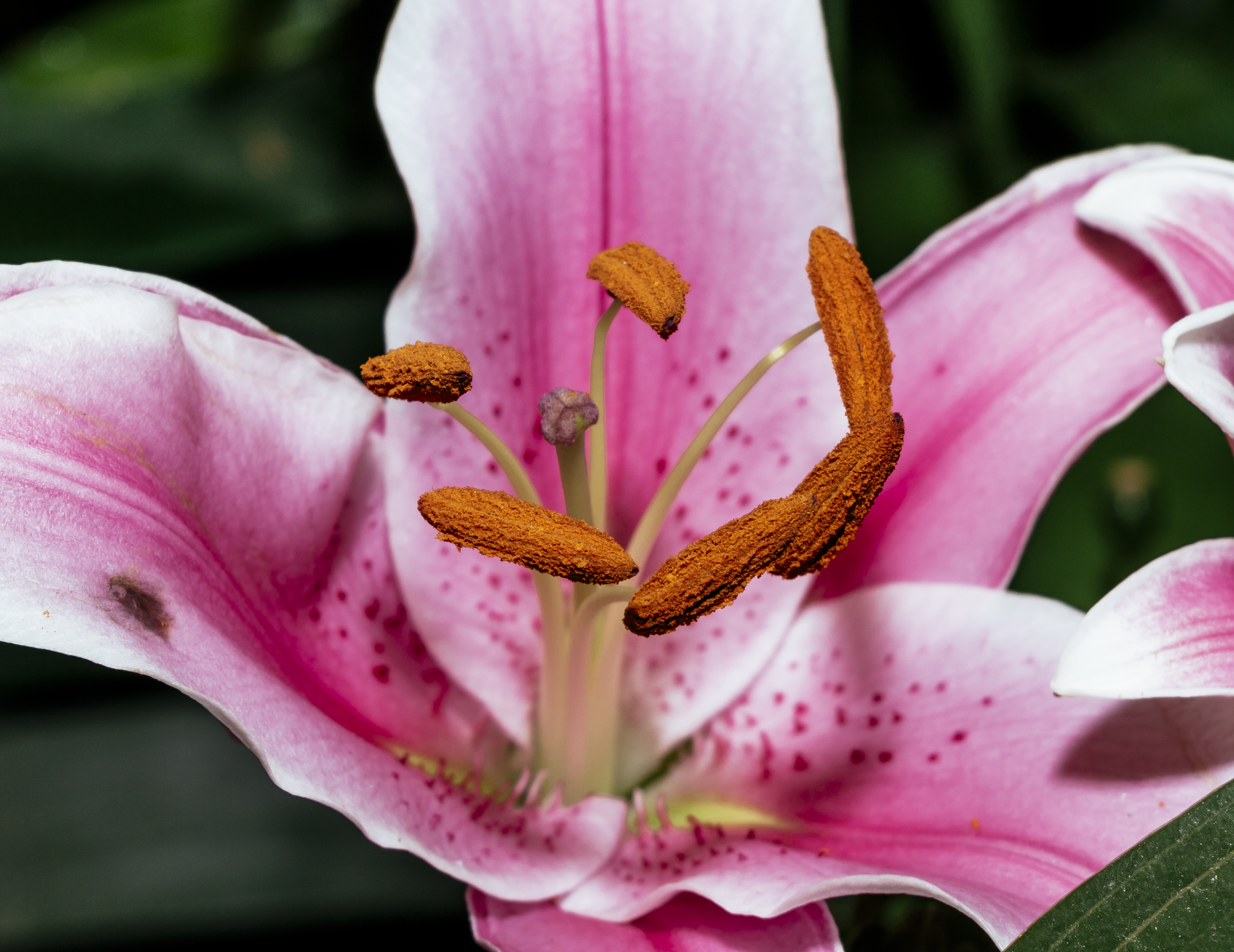
Closeup of stamens and pistil of Lilium 'Stargazer'

== Etymology ==
- Stamen is the Latin word meaning "thread" (originally thread of the warp, in weaving).
- Filament derives from classical Latin filum, meaning "thread"
- Anther derives from French anthère, from classical Latin anthera, meaning "medicine extracted from the flower" in turn from Ancient Greek ἀνθηρά (anthērá), feminine of ἀνθηρός (anthērós) meaning "flowery", from ἄνθος (ánthos) meaning "flower"
- Androecium (pl.: androecia) derives from Ancient Greek ἀνήρ (anḗr) meaning "man", and οἶκος (oîkos) meaning "house" or "chamber/room".

== Variation in morphology ==
Stamens, with distal anther attached to the filament stalk, in context of floral anatomy

Depending on the species of plant, some or all of the stamens in a flower may be attached to the petals or to the floral axis. They also may be free-standing or fused to one another in many different ways, including fusion of some but not all stamens. The filaments may be fused and the anthers free, or the filaments free and the anthers fused. Rather than there being two locules, one locule of a stamen may fail to develop, or alternatively the two locules may merge late in development to give a single locule. Extreme cases of stamen fusion occur in some species of Cyclanthera in the family Cucurbitaceae and in section Cyclanthera of genus Phyllanthus (family Euphorbiaceae) where the stamens form a ring around the gynoecium, with a single locule. Plants having a single stamen are referred to as "monandrous."

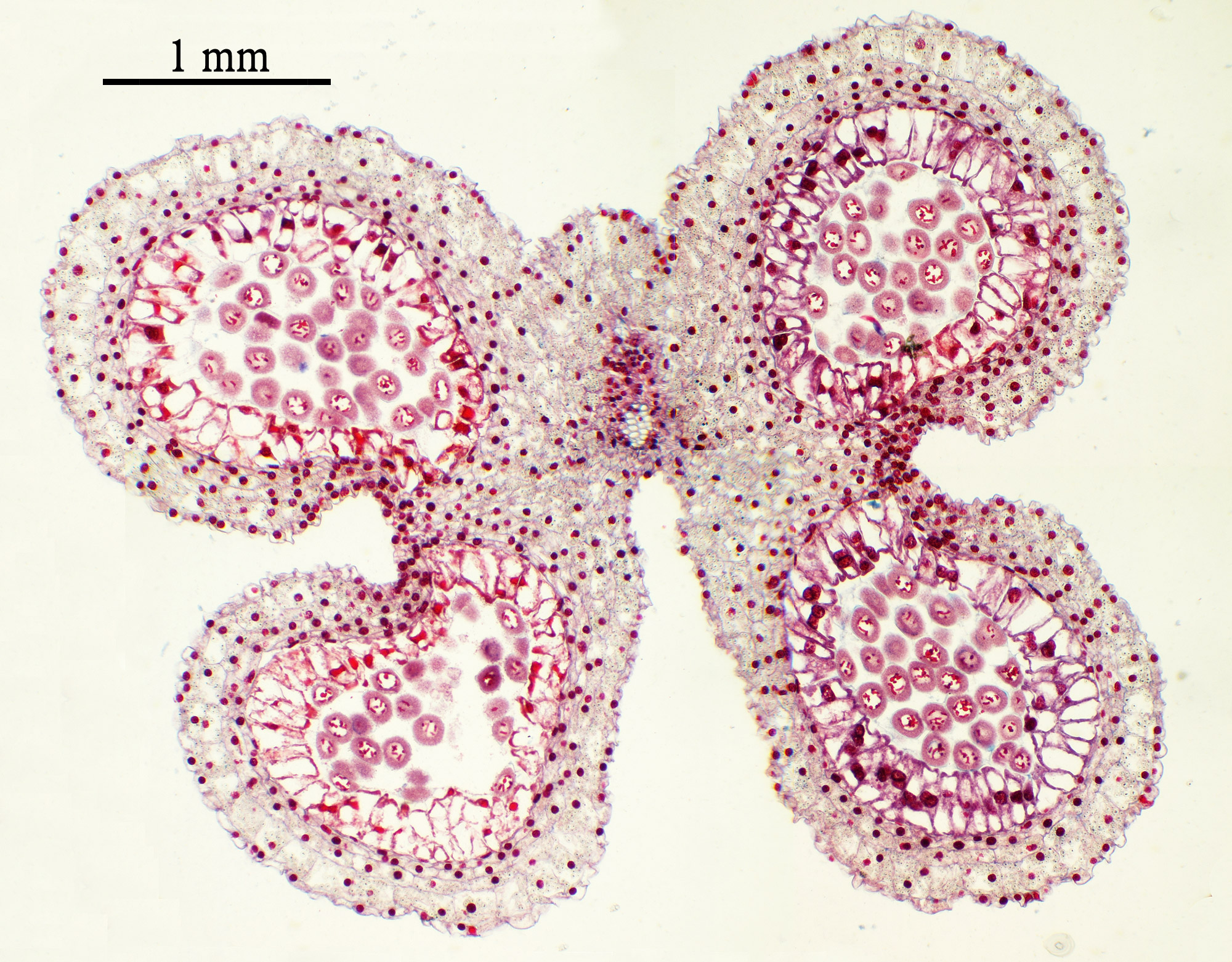
Cross section of a Lilium stamen, with four locules surrounded by the tapetum

== Pollen production ==
A typical anther contains four microsporangia. The microsporangia form sacs or pockets (locules) in the anther (anther sacs or pollen sacs). The two separate locules on each side of an anther may fuse into a single locule. Each microsporangium is lined with a nutritive tissue layer called the tapetum and initially contains diploid pollen mother cells. These undergo meiosis to form haploid spores. The spores may remain attached to each other in a tetrad or separate after meiosis. Each microspore then divides mitotically to form an immature microgametophyte called a pollen grain.

The pollen is eventually released when the anther forms openings (dehisces). These may consist of longitudinal slits, pores, as in the heath family (Ericaceae), or by valves, as in the barberry family (Berberidaceae). In some plants, notably members of the Orchidaceae and Asclepiadoideae families, the pollen remains in masses called pollinia, which are adapted to attach to particular pollinating agents such as birds or insects. More commonly, mature pollen grains separate and are dispensed by wind or water, pollinating insects, birds or other pollination vectors.

Pollen of angiosperms must be transported to the stigma, the receptive surface of the carpel, of a compatible flower, for successful pollination to occur. After arriving, the pollen grain (an immature microgametophyte) typically completes its development. It may grow a pollen tube and undergo mitosis to produce two sperm nuclei.

== Sexual reproduction in plants ==
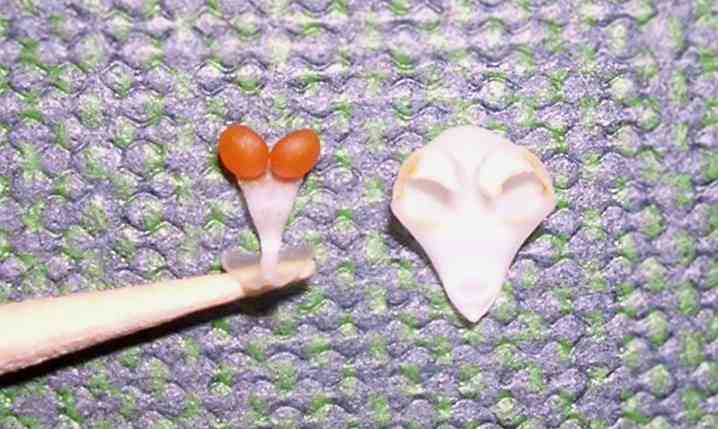
Stamen with pollinia and its anther cap. Phalaenopsis orchid.

In the typical flower (that is, in the majority of flowering plant species) each flower has both carpels and stamens. In some species, however, the flowers are unisexual with only carpels or stamens. (monoecious = both types of flowers found on the same plant; dioecious = the two types of flower found only on different plants). A flower with only stamens is called androecious. A flower with only carpels is called gynoecious.

A pistil consists of one or more carpels. A flower with functional stamens but no functional pistil is called a staminate flower, or (inaccurately) a male flower. A flower with a functional pistil but no functional stamens is called a pistillate flower, or (inaccurately) a female flower.

An abortive or rudimentary stamen is called a staminodium or staminode, such as in Scrophularia nodosa.

The carpels and stamens of orchids are fused into a column. The top part of the column is formed by the anther, which is covered by an anther cap.

== Terminology ==
=== Stamen ===
Stamens can also be adnate (fused or joined from more than one whorl):

- epipetalous: adnate to the corolla
- epiphyllous: adnate to undifferentiated tepals (as in many Liliaceae)

They can have different lengths from each other:

- didymous: two equal pairs
- didynamous: occurring in two pairs, a long pair and a shorter pair
- tetradynamous: occurring as a set of six stamens with four long and two shorter ones

or respective to the rest of the flower (perianth):

- exserted: extending beyond the corolla
- included: not extending beyond the corolla

They may be arranged in one of two different patterns:

- spiral; or
- whorled: one or more discrete whorls (series)

They may be arranged, with respect to the petals:

- diplostemonous: in two whorls, the outer alternating with the petals, while the inner is opposite the petals.
- haplostemenous: having a single series of stamens, equal in number to the proper number of petals and alternating with them
- obdiplostemonous: in two whorls, with twice the number of stamens as petals, the outer opposite the petals, inner opposite the sepals, e.g. Simaroubaceae (see diagram)

=== Connective ===
Where the connective is very small, or imperceptible, the anther lobes are close together, and the connective is referred to as discrete, e.g. Euphorbia pp., Adhatoda zeylanica. Where the connective separates the anther lobes, it is called divaricate, e.g. Tilia, Justicia gendarussa. The connective may also be a long and stalk-like, crosswise on the filament, this is a distractile connective, e.g. Salvia. The connective may also bear appendages, and is called appendiculate, e.g. Nerium odorum and some other species of Apocynaceae. In Nerium, the appendages are united as a staminal corona.

=== Filament ===
A column formed from the fusion of multiple filaments is known as an androphore. Stamens can be connate (fused or joined in the same whorl) as follows:

- monadelphous: fused into a single, compound structure
- declinate: curving downwards, then up at the tip (also – declinate-descending)
- diadelphous: joined partially into two androecial structures
- pentadelphous: joined partially into five androecial structures
- synandrous: only the anthers are connate (such as in the Asteraceae). The fused stamens are referred to as a synandrium.

=== Anther ===
The anther can be attached to the filament's connective in two ways:

- basifixed: attached at its base to the filament
  - pseudobasifixed: a somewhat misnomer configuration where connective tissue extends in a tube around the filament tip
- dorsifixed: attached at its center to the filament, and this position is usually combined with the anther being versatile, that is being able to move on the tip of the filament

Anthers can open in various ways.

- extrorse away from the centre of the flower
- introrse towards the centre of the flower
- latrorse towards the sides

Anthers occur in different shapes.

- linear meaning line-shaped
- rounded
- sagittate meaning arrow-shaped
- sinuous meaning winding or wavy
- reniform meaning kidney-shaped

== Gallery ==
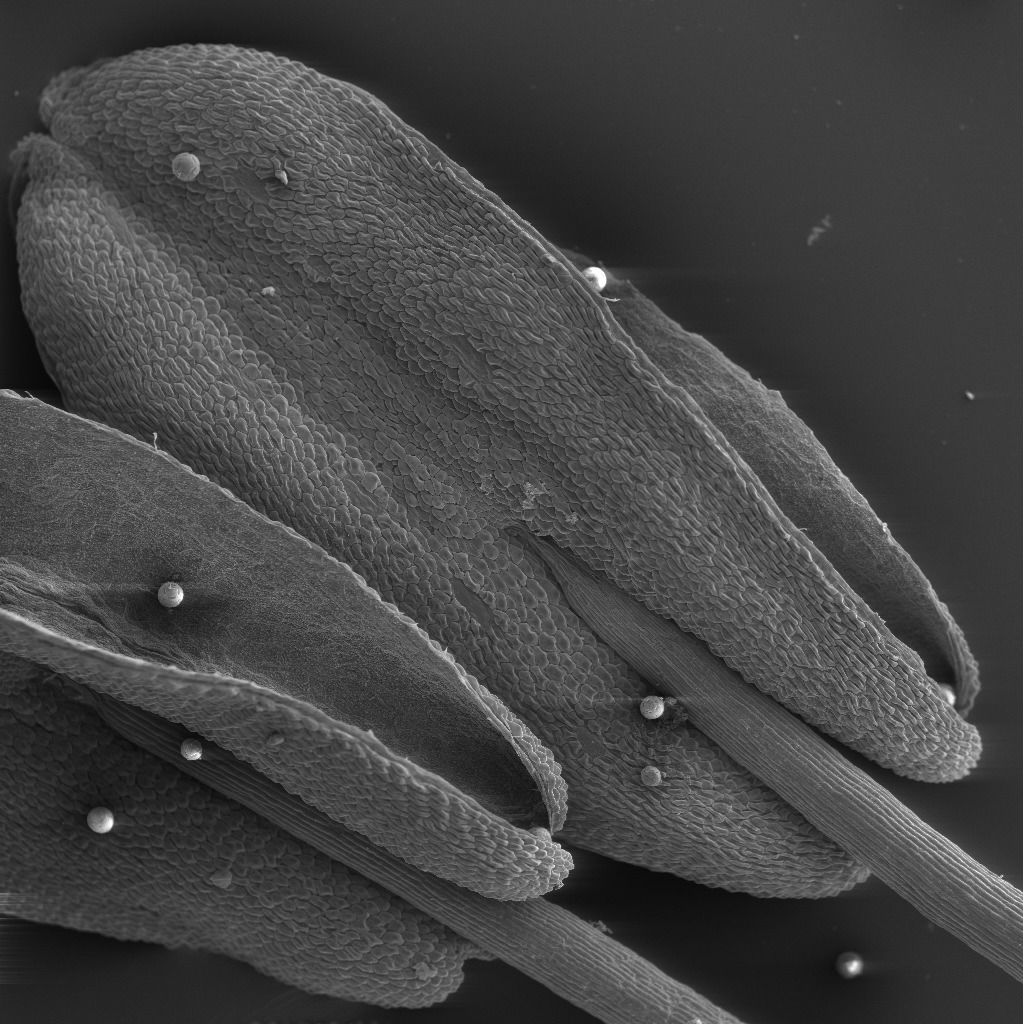
Scanning electron microscope image of Pentas lanceolata anthers, with pollen grains on surface

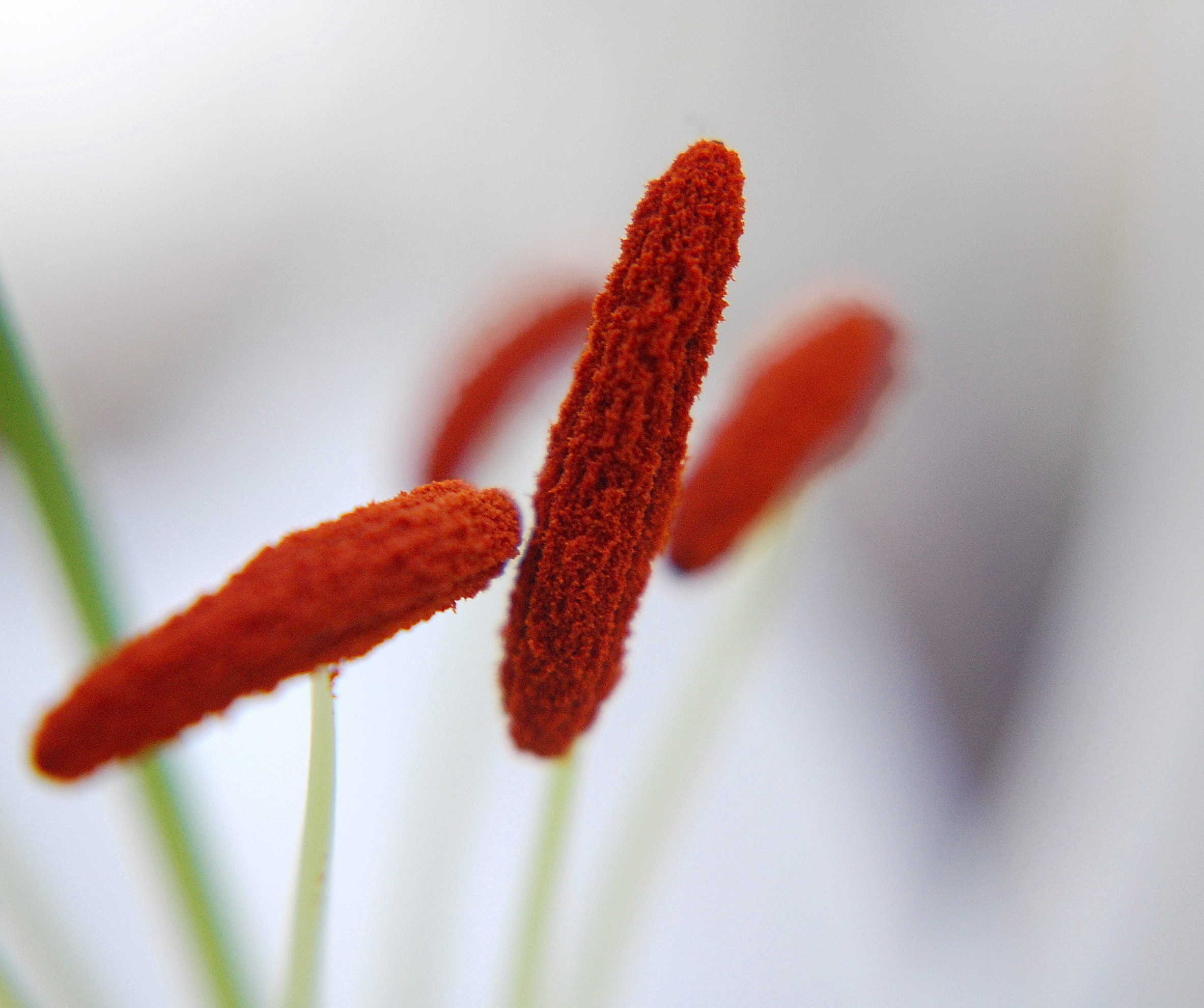
Lily stamens with prominent red anthers and white filaments

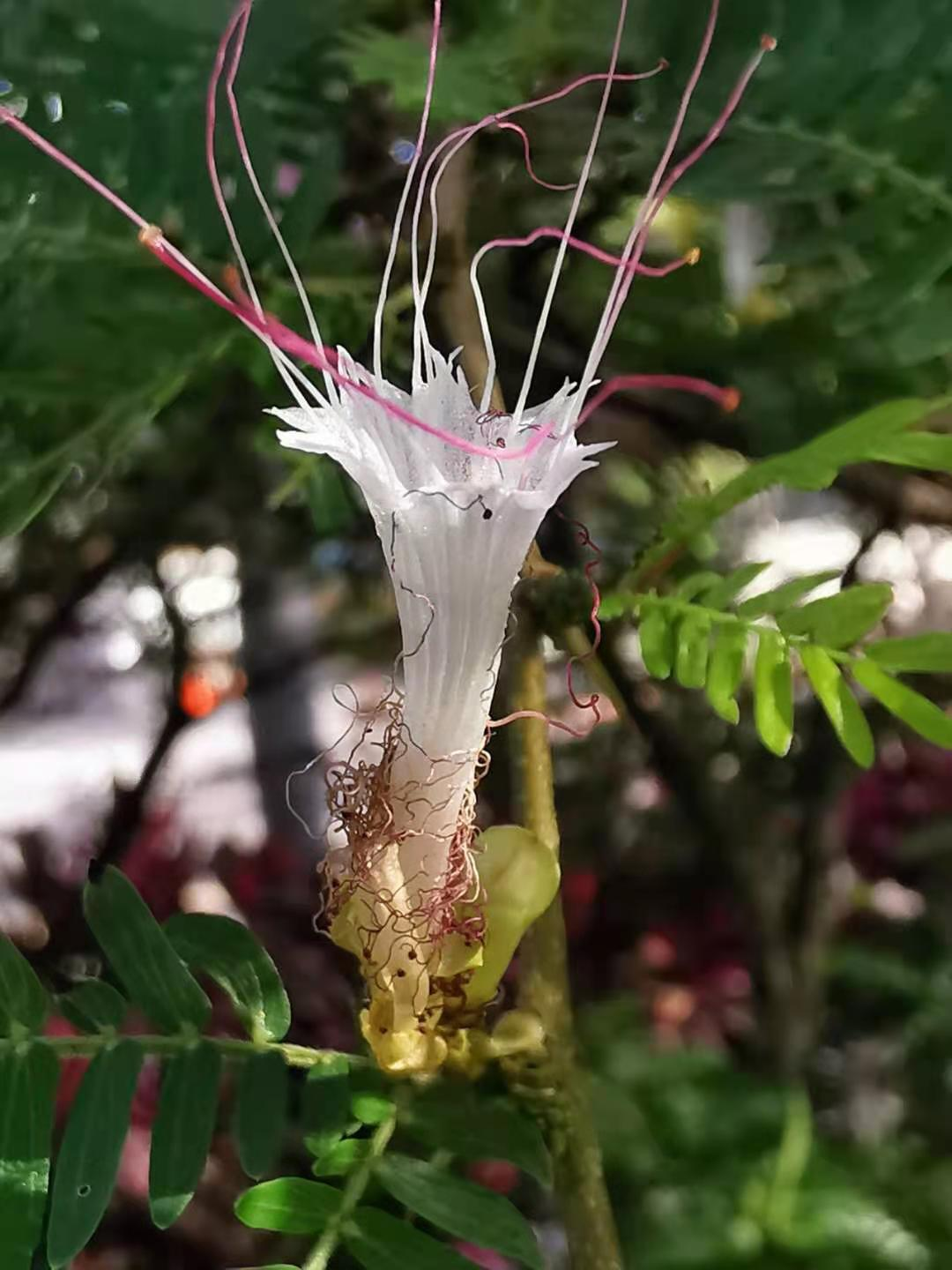
Calliandra surinamensis petaloid stamens

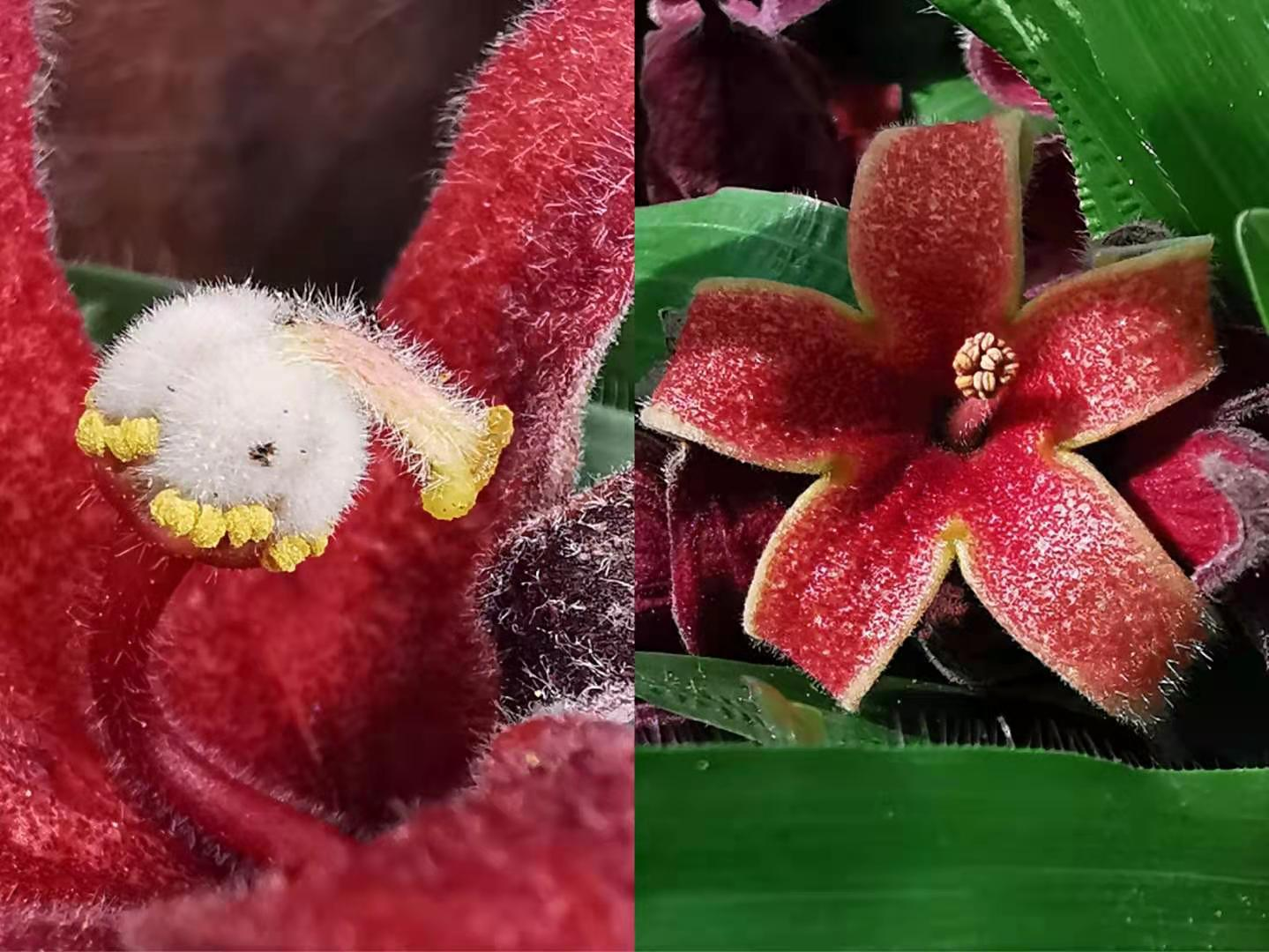
Sterculia foetida stamens

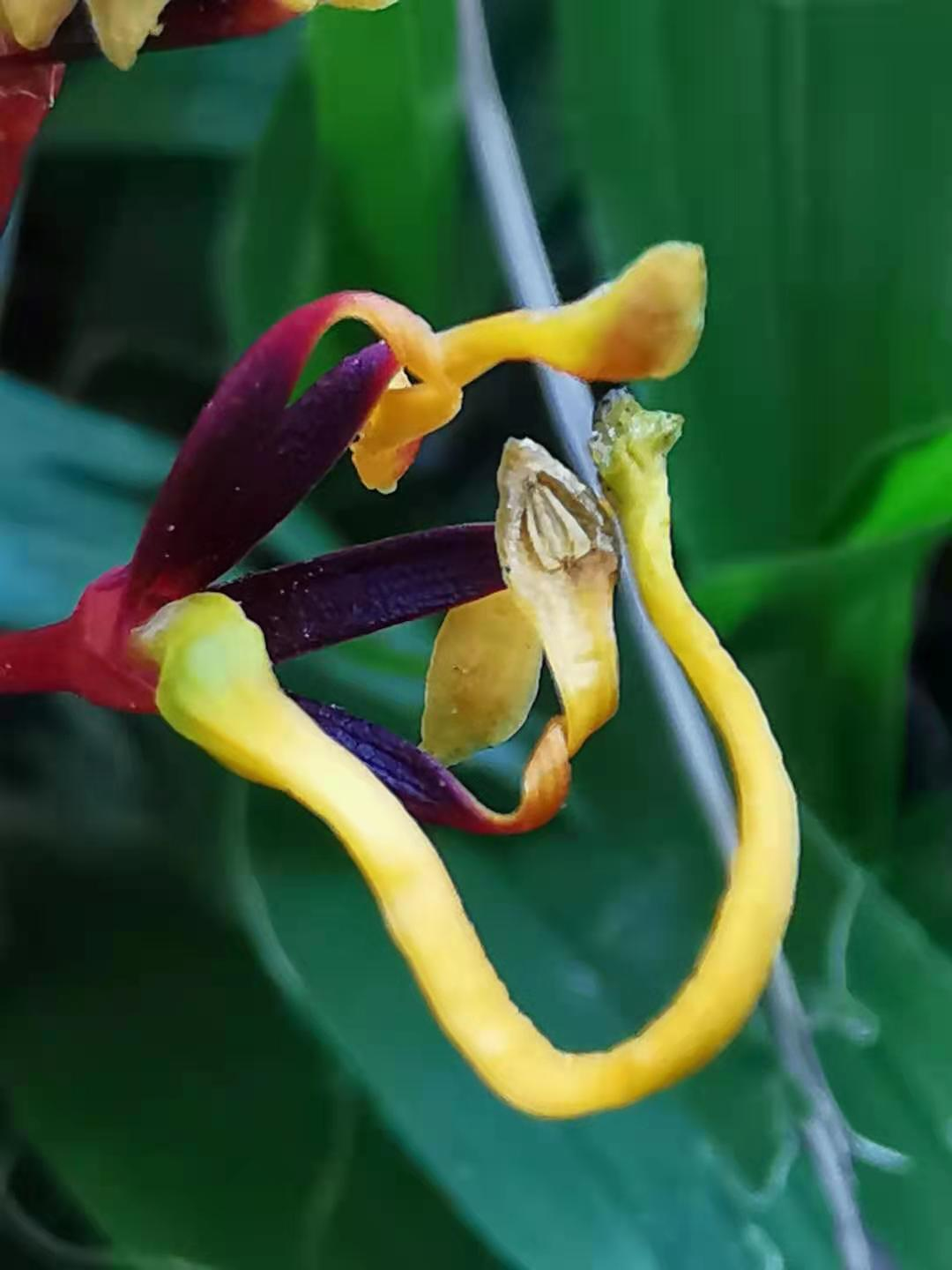
Stamen of a Grevillea robusta

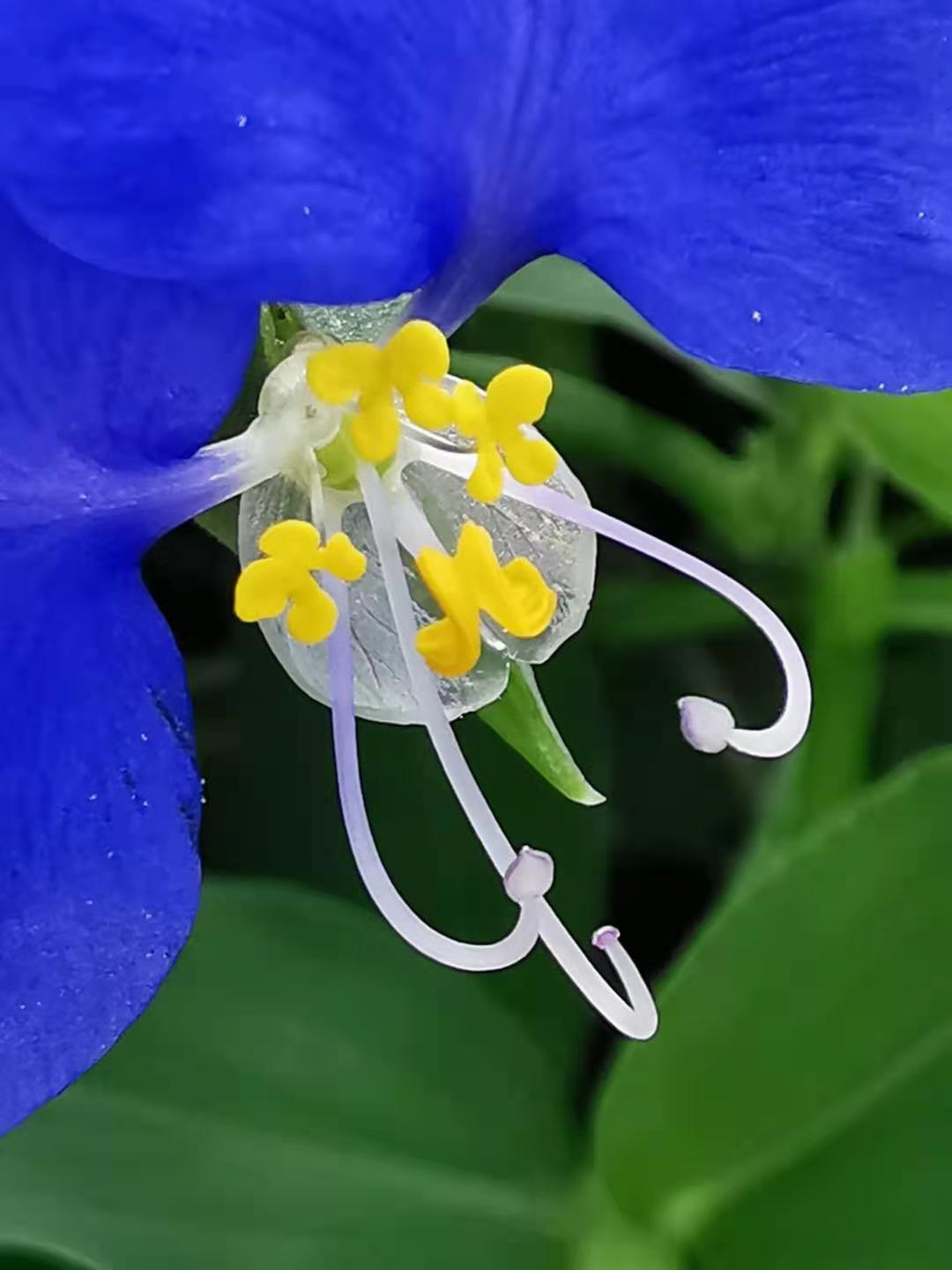
Commelina communis three different types of stamens

== Bibliography ==
- Rendle, Alfred Barton (1911). "Flower" . In Chisholm, Hugh (ed.). Encyclopædia Britannica. Vol. 10 (11th ed.). Cambridge University Press. pp. 553–573.
- Simpson, Michael G. (2011). "Androecium". Plant Systematics. Academic Press. p. 371. ISBN 978-0-08-051404-8.
- Weberling, Focko (1992). "1.5 The Androecium". Morphology of Flowers and Inflorescences (trans. Richard J. Pankhurst). CUP Archive. p. 93. ISBN 0-521-43832-2.
- "Obdiplostemony (obdiplostemonous)". Glossary for Vascular Plants. The William & Lynda Steere Herbarium, New York Botanical Garden.
