= Sciaphila thaidanica =

Scientific classification
- Kingdom: Plantae
- Clade: Tracheophytes
- Clade: Angiosperms
- Clade: Monocots
- Order: Pandanales
- Family: Triuridaceae
- Genus: Sciaphila
- Species: S. thaidanica

Binomial name
- Sciaphila thaidanica K.Larsen 1961

Species of flowering plant

Sciaphila thaidanica is one of the members of the genus Sciaphila, (a genus in the family Triuridaceae, one of the groups of mycoheterotrophic plants, plants that obtains food by digesting intracellular fungi, rather than by photosynthesis) It has light purple coloration with large flowers and inflorescence. It is characterized by one of the smallest plastomes ever encountered, which at the same time are very compact. It was recently discovered in Borneo.
