= Triuris hyalina =

Scientific classification
- Kingdom: Plantae
- Clade: Tracheophytes
- Clade: Angiosperms
- Clade: Monocots
- Order: Pandanales
- Family: Triuridaceae
- Genus: Triuris
- Species: T. hyalina

Binomial name
- Triuris hyalina Miers, 1841

Synonyms
- Heterotypic Synonyms: Triuris hyalina var. longicauda Brade; Triuris major Poulsen; Triuris mycenoides Ule

Species of flowering plant

Triuris hyalina is a species of flowering plant in family Triuridaceae. It is native to Bolivia, Brazil, Colombia, Ecuador,Guyana, Suriname, and Venezuela. It is small plant, no more than a few cm tall. It is mycoheterotrophic, lacking chlorophyll, and obtains its nutrients from associations with soil fungi.
