= Kupea martinetugei =

Conservation status
- Critically Endangered (IUCN 3.1)

Scientific classification
- Kingdom: Plantae
- Clade: Tracheophytes
- Clade: Angiosperms
- Clade: Monocots
- Order: Pandanales
- Family: Triuridaceae
- Genus: Kupea
- Species: K. martinetugei

Binomial name
- Kupea martinetugei Cheek & S.A.Williams

Species of flowering plant

Kupea martinetugei is a species of plant in the Triuridaceae family. It is endemic to Cameroon. Its natural habitat is subtropical or tropical moist lowland forest. It is threatened by habitat loss.
