= Barbara A. Ambrose =

American botanist

Barbara A. Ambrose Ph.D.
- Citizenship: United States of America
- Education: Ph.D. Molecular, Cellular and Developmental Biology, University of California, San Diego; B.S. Biology, University of the Virgin Islands
- Scientific career
- Fields: Botany, Plant Development, Plant Evolution, Evo-Devo, Genomics, Molecular Biology, Systematics
- Workplaces: New York Botanical Garden, Graduate Center, City University of New York, Massey University
- Thesis: PhD: "Floral organ specification in Zea mays" (2000)
- Doctoral advisor: Robert J. Schmidt

Barbara Ambrose is a botanist working in the field of Plant Evolutionary Developmental Biology (Evo-Devo). As the Director of Laboratory Research at the New York Botanical Garden, Ambrose is a researcher, leader and mentor in her field who is interested in patterns in plant diversity on macro and micro scales. Some of her research includes the development of fruit genes in the context of flowering plants.

== Education ==
Ambrose earned a Ph.D. in Biology from the University of California, San Diego in June 2000, starting her career as a developmental geneticist working on maize (Zea mays) flowers. She also holds a B.Sc. in Biology from University of the Virgin Islands, St. Thomas which she earned in 1994.

One of Ambrose's Ph.D. articles Molecular and genetic analyses of the Silky1 gene reveal conservation in floral organ specification between eudicots and monocots, published in Molecular Cell was one of the first Plant Evo-Devo papers, and has been cited nearly 500 times, as per Google Scholar metrics.

== Career ==
=== National Autonomous University of Mexico ===
Ambrose began her career first as a National Science Foundation International Postdoctoral fellow (2000-2002) and then as a Postdoctoral Fellow (2002–2003) at the National Autonomous University of Mexico (UNAM) in Mexico. During this time, her work was also focused on floral evo-devo in Lacandonia schismatica, a monocot with inside-out flowers. During her postdoctoral research, she analyzed Mexican triurids to study how Lacandonia schismatica developed its unusual floral structure.

=== Massey University ===
Ambrose was next a Lecturer in the Institute of Molecular BioScience (IMBS) at Massey University in New Zealand from October 2003 until August 2008, where her research focused on the control of plant development at the molecular level, including Evo-Devo research related to fruit. At Massey, Ambrose was involved in the planning of the Manawatu Microscopy & Imaging Centre (MMIC). She also developed a course in Plant Development and worked on a project with Plant Biology and Massey gardening staff to label plants in the living collection, making this collection more accessible.

=== City University of New York ===
Since 2008, Ambrose has been an adjunct professor for the Graduate Center, City University of New York (CUNY) in the Plant Science subprogram where she has taught courses on Plant Development and Comparative Morphology of Vascular Plants.

=== New York Botanical Garden ===
Ambrose has worked at the New York Botanical Garden since 2008. Hired as an Assistant Curator in the Plant Genomics department in 2008, she was promoted to Associate Curator in 2014. In 2017, Ambrose was named Director of Laboratory Research. Ambrose's research interest is in Plant Evolutionary Developmental Genomics with research foci in Evolution as it relates to Molecular Biology and Genomics and Biochemistry as they relate to Gene Expression/Gene Regulation and Genetics/Development. Her Evo-Devo research has continued to expand into work with leaves and seeds, using the latest scientific techniques to understand the evolution of morphological novelties. Recent projects also include the use of machine learning to identify herbarium specimens through kaggle competitions, notably in 2019 and 2020.

=== Grants ===
Ambrose has been awarded three grants from the National Science Foundation (NSF) over the span of fifteen years. In 2009 she received the Functional Evolution of the APETALA1/FRUITFULL gene lineage and in 2018 the MRI Acquisition-Advancing plant and fungal research at NYBG with a modern Scanning Electron Microscope. Most recently as of 2024, she received the grant titled Collaborative Research: The evolution and development of fundamental reproductive structures: sporangia.

==== Current research projects ====
- Evolution and Development in Lycophytes and Ferns
- Fruit Evolution and Development
- Transforming Selaginella Apoda Into a Major Model Species
- Elaphoglossum – the deer tongue ferns

=== Scientific outreach ===
In addition to her academic work, Ambrose is very active in scientific outreach activities in New York City, through CUNY, NYBG, and other local organizations including Cooper Hewitt.

== Selected works and publications ==
=== Publications ===
- B.A. Ambrose and A. Vasco (2016) Bringing the multicellular fern meristem into focus. New Phytologist 210: 790-793. doi:10.1111/nph.13825
- Ambrose, B.A. (2010) MADS-Box Genes in Plant Evolution and Development. International Journal of Plant Developmental Biology 4: 30-37.
- B.A. Ambrose, S. Espinosa-Matías, S. Vázquez-Santana, F. Vergara-Silva, E. Martínez, J. Márquez-Guzmán and E. Alvarez-Buylla. (2006) Comparative developmental series of the Mexican triurids support a euanthial interpretation for the unusual reproductive axes of Lacandonia schismatica (Triuridaceae). Am. J. Bot. 93: 15-35.
- B.A. Ambrose and K. Prasad. MADS about Plant Development. (2004) NZ Bioscience (August) 8-13.
- B.A. Ambrose, D.R. Lerner, P. Ciceri, C.M. Padilla, M.F. Yanofsky, and R.J. Schmidt (2000) Molecular and genetic analyses of the Silky1 gene reveal conservation in floral organ specification between eudicots and monocots. Molecular Cell 5: 569-579. doi:10.1016/S1097-2765(00)80450-5

=== Books ===
- Barbara A. Ambrose and Michael D. Purugganan, Editors. 2013. ‘The Evolution of Plant Form’ Annual Plant Reviews 45. Wiley-Blackwell, London.
- Barbara A. Ambrose. 2013. The Morphology and Development of Lycophytes in ‘The Evolution of Plant Form’ B.A. Ambrose and M.D. Purugganan (Eds.) Annual Plant Reviews 45. Wiley-Blackwell, London.
- Barbara A. Ambrose and Cristina Ferrandiz. 2013. Development and the Evolution of Form in ‘The Evolution of Plant Form’ B.A. Ambrose and M.D. Purugganan (Eds.) Annual Plant Reviews 45. Wiley-Blackwell, London.
