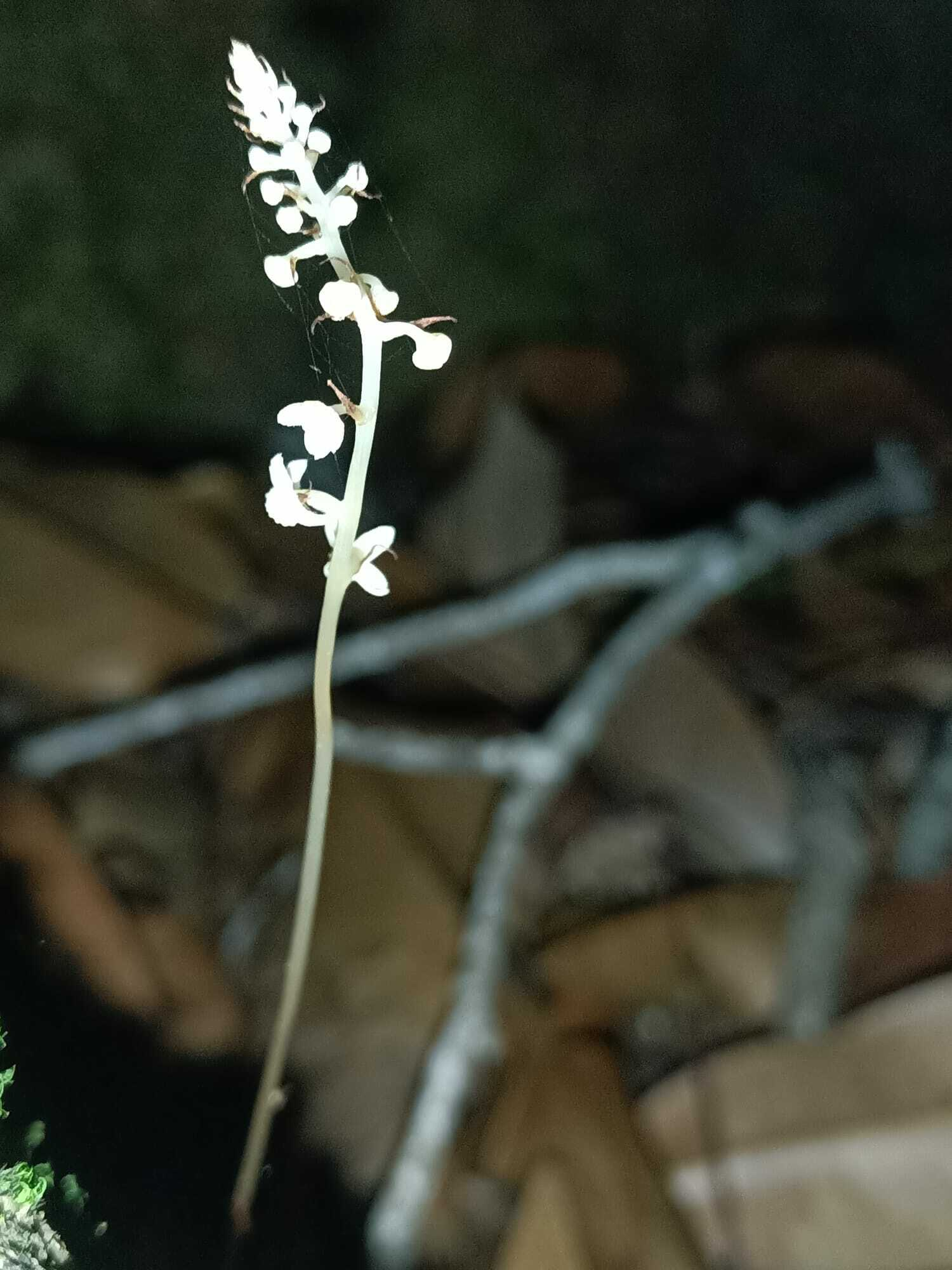
- Soridium spruceanum in French Guiana

Scientific classification
- Kingdom: Plantae
- Clade: Tracheophytes
- Clade: Angiosperms
- Clade: Monocots
- Order: Pandanales
- Family: Triuridaceae
- Genus: Soridium; Miers
- Species: S. spruceanum

Binomial name
- Soridium spruceanum Miers

Synonyms
- Homotypic Synonyms: Sciaphila spruceana (Miers) Engl.; Heterotypic Synonyms: Sciaphila brevipes S.F.Blake

= Soridium =

Genus of parasitic plants

Soridium is a monotypic genus of plants in the family Triuridaceae. The genus comprises only one known species, Soridium spruceanum. It is myco-heterotrophic, lacking chlorophyll, and instead obtains nutrients from fungi in the soil. It is native to Belize,Brazil, Colombia, French Guiana, Guatemala, Suriname, and Venezuela.
