= Kihansia =

Conservation status
- Critically Endangered (IUCN 3.1)

Scientific classification
- Kingdom: Plantae
- Clade: Tracheophytes
- Clade: Angiosperms
- Clade: Monocots
- Order: Pandanales
- Family: Triuridaceae
- Genus: Kihansia; Cheek
- Species: K. lovettii

Binomial name
- Kihansia lovettii Cheek

Genus of flowering plants

Kihansia is a genus of parasitic plants in the Triuridaceae, lacking chlorophyll and obtaining nutrients from fungi in the soil. It contains only one known species, Kihansia lovettii, endemic to the Ulanga District of Tanzania.
