= Kupea =

Scientific classification
- Kingdom: Plantae
- Clade: Tracheophytes
- Clade: Angiosperms
- Clade: Monocots
- Order: Pandanales
- Family: Triuridaceae
- Genus: Kupea; Cheek & S.A.Williams

Type species
- Kupea martinetugei Cheek & S.A.Williams

Genus of flowering plants

Kupea is a genus of myco-heterotrophic plants in family Triuridaceae, native to tropical Africa. It contains the following species:

- Kupea jonii Cheek – Ulanga District (Tanzania)
- Kupea martinetugei Cheek & S.A.Williams – Cameroon
