= Triuridopsis =

Scientific classification
- Kingdom: Plantae
- Clade: Tracheophytes
- Clade: Angiosperms
- Clade: Monocots
- Order: Pandanales
- Family: Triuridaceae
- Genus: Triuridopsis; H.Maas & Maas

Genus of flowering plants

Triuridopsis is a genus of parasitic flowering plants in the family Triuridaceae. It has two known species, both native to western South America.

- Triuridopsis intermedia T.Franke, Beenken & C.Hahn - Bolivia
- Triuridopsis peruviana H.Maas & Maas - Peru
