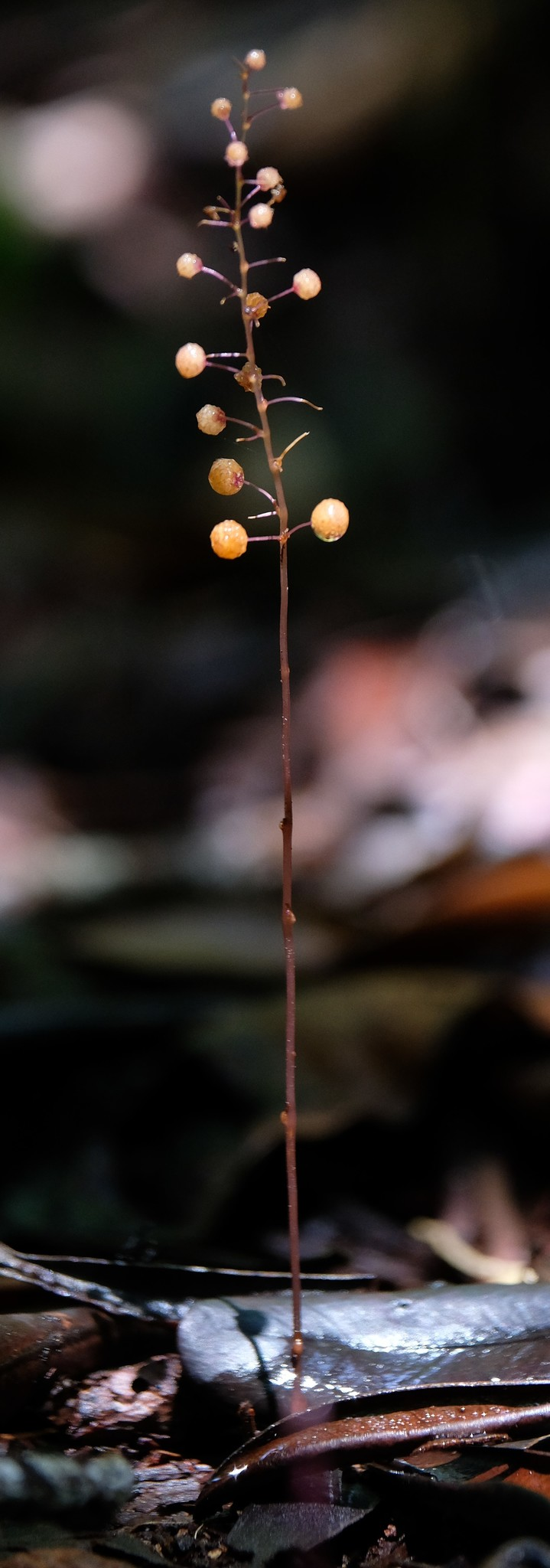
- Seychellaria madagascariensis in Madagascar

Scientific classification
- Kingdom: Plantae
- Clade: Tracheophytes
- Clade: Angiosperms
- Clade: Monocots
- Order: Pandanales
- Family: Triuridaceae
- Genus: Seychellaria; Hemsl.

Type species
- Seychellaria thomassetii Hemsl.

= Seychellaria =

Genus of plants

Seychellaria is a genus of myco-heterotrophic plants in family Triuridaceae, native to Tanzania and to certain islands in the Indian Ocean.

- Seychellaria africana Vollesen - Mwanihana Forest Reserve in Tanzania
- Seychellaria madagascariensis C.H.Wright - Madagascar
- Seychellaria perrieri Schltr. - Madagascar
- Seychellaria thomassetii Hemsl. - Mahé Island in the Seychelles
