= Triuris =

Scientific classification
- Kingdom: Plantae
- Clade: Tracheophytes
- Clade: Angiosperms
- Clade: Monocots
- Order: Pandanales
- Family: Triuridaceae
- Genus: Triuris; Miers, 1841

Genus of flowering plants

Triuris is a genus in the family Triuridaceae. Species in the genus are monocots that lack chlorophyll and derive their nutrients through symbiotic associations with fungi. The genus is native to Bolivia, Brazil, Colombia, Ecuador, Guatemala, Guyana, Mexico, Suriname, and Venezuela.

== Species ==
Accepted species include:

- Triuris alata Brade
- Triuris brevistylis Donn.Sm.
- Triuris hexophthalma Maas
- Triuris hyalina Miers
