= Peltophyllum =

Scientific classification
- Kingdom: Plantae
- Clade: Tracheophytes
- Clade: Angiosperms
- Clade: Monocots
- Order: Pandanales
- Family: Triuridaceae
- Genus: Peltophyllum; Gardner

Type species
- Peltophyllum luteum Gardner

Synonyms
- Hexuris Miers

Genus of flowering plants

Peltophyllum is a genus of myco-heterotrophic plants in family Triuridaceae, native to southern South America. It contains the following species:

- Peltophyllum caudatum (Poulsen) R.Schmid & M.D.Turner - Rio de Janeiro
- Peltophyllum luteum Gardner - Brazil, Argentina, Paraguay
