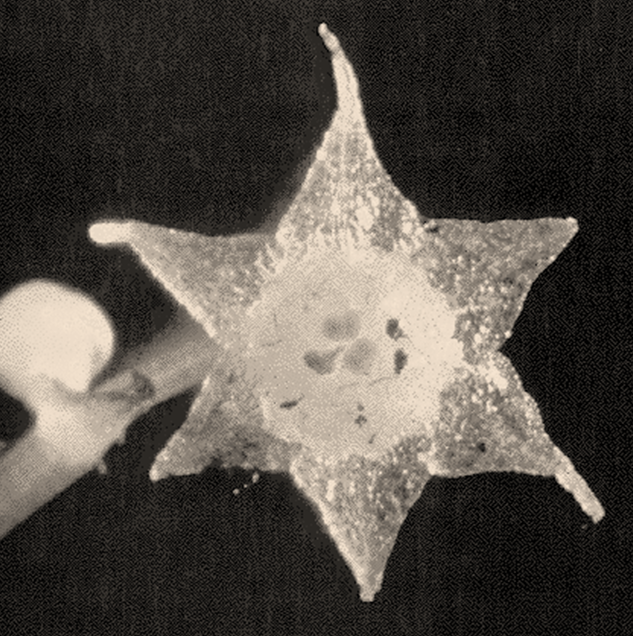
- Flower of Lacandonia schismatica

Scientific classification
- Kingdom: Plantae
- Clade: Embryophytes
- Clade: Tracheophytes
- Clade: Spermatophytes
- Clade: Angiosperms
- Clade: Monocots
- Order: Pandanales
- Family: Triuridaceae
- Genus: Lacandonia
- Species: L. schismatica

Binomial name
- Lacandonia schismatica E.Martínez & Ramos

= Lacandonia schismatica =

Species of flowering plant

Lacandonia schismatica is a species of plant in the Triuridaceae family which has a symbiotic relationship with fungi, known as myco-heterotrophy. It is endemic to the Lacandon Jungle in the State of Chiapas in southern Mexico. It is known from very few populations and is considered endangered by the researchers who investigate this species. It, and its recently discovered relation Lacandonia braziliana, are the only known flowering plants which in its natural population has a spatial inversion of the reproductive floral whorls (ie stamens and carpels): the two to four stamens are positioned centrally within the flower, and the 60 to 80 carpels arranged in a ring around them. The pollen grain never leaves the anther, but sends the pollen tube backwards through the length of the stamen, across the receptacle and then into the pistil from below. The only thing distantly like this is among the species of Albuca, where the pollen tube passes through the tepals.

Lacandonia schismatica is known from several small populations at altitudes around 200 m (656 ft) in the Lacandon Jungle. It grows in shady sites within this rainforest. Gerrit Davidse and Esteban Martínez noted in 1990 how the plants are "extremely localized and highly endangered" due to encroaching habitat conversion to cattle pasture. They also explain that the species is difficult to cultivate and therefore they encourage other scientists to study this unique organism's biology before it can no longer be found in the wild.
