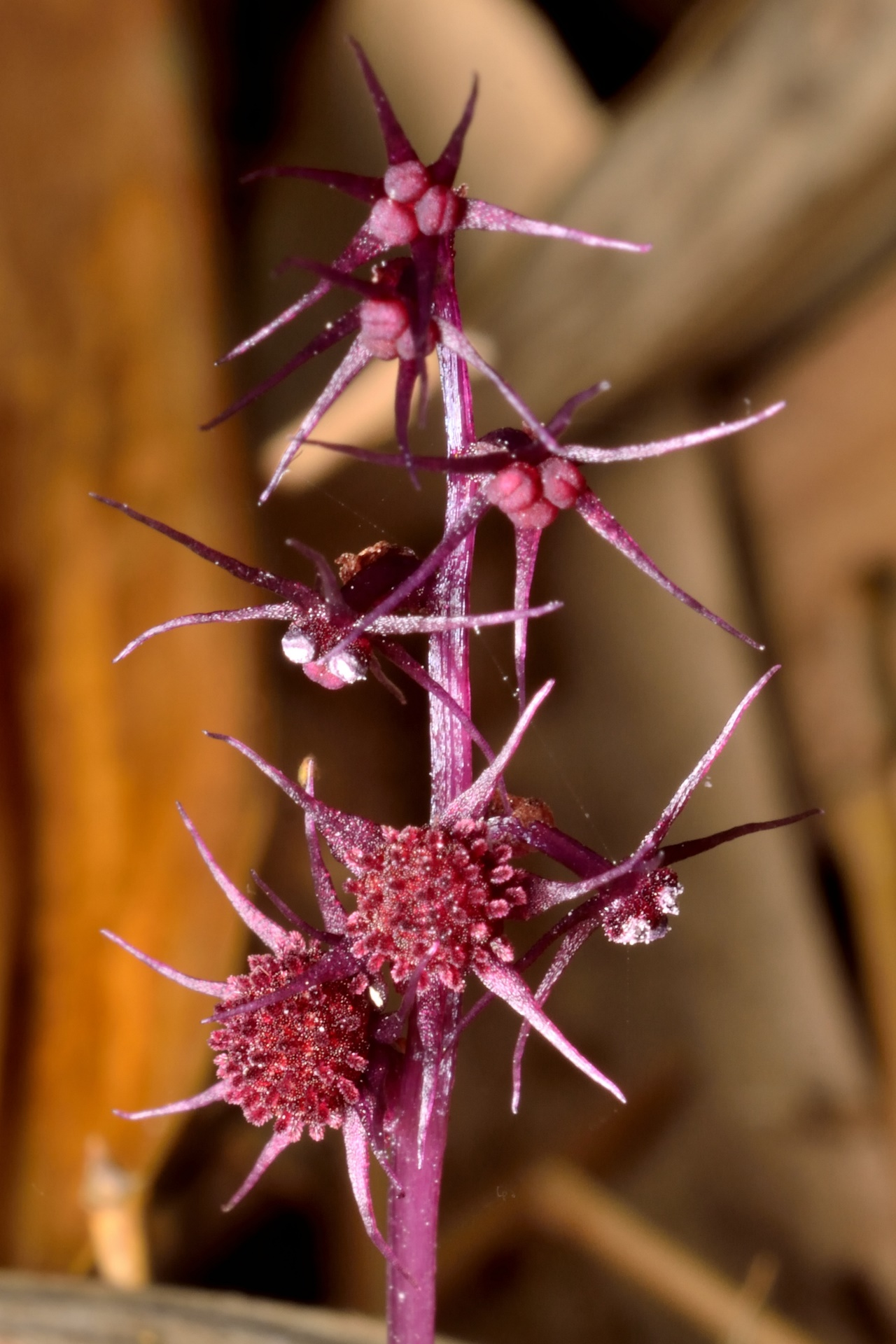
- Sciaphila secundiflora

Scientific classification
- Kingdom: Plantae
- Clade: Embryophytes
- Clade: Tracheophytes
- Clade: Spermatophytes
- Clade: Angiosperms
- Clade: Monocots
- Order: Pandanales
- Family: Triuridaceae; Gardner

Genera
- See text

= Triuridaceae =

Family of flowering plants

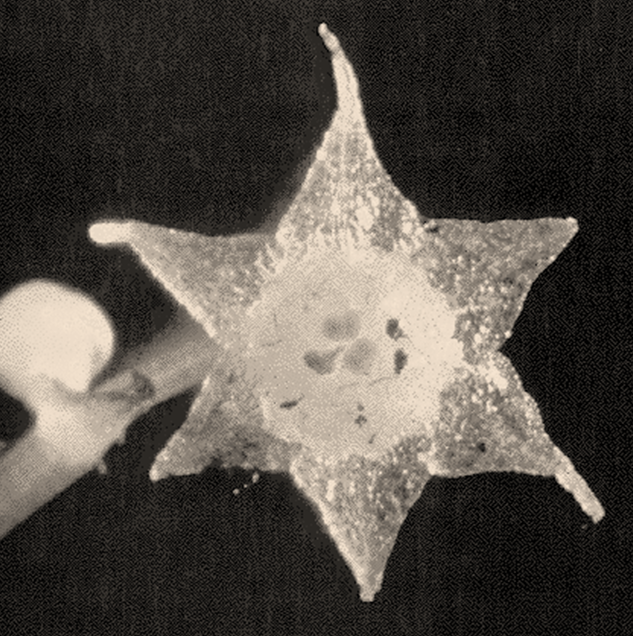
Flower of Lacandonia schismatica

Triuridaceae are a family of tropical and subtropical flowering plants, including nine genera with a total of approximately 55 known species. All members lack chlorophyll and are mycoheterotrophic (obtain food by digesting intracellular fungi, often erroneously called 'saprophytes'). The heterotrophic lifestyle of these plants has resulted in a loss of xylem vessels and stomata, and a reduction of leaves to scales.

The flowers of Triuridaceae have tepals which are fused at the base and contain 10 to many free carpels.

== Systematics ==
The circumscription of Triuridaceae has been unstable and some taxa may be paraphyletic.

Triuridaceae have been allied with Alismataceae (based on the free carpels) but the APG III system (2009) places them among the non-commelinid monocots, in the Order Pandanales.

The genus Lacandonia is sometimes placed in its own family, Lacandoniaceae.

Triuridaceae are included in the Kew Royal Botanical Garden World Checklist of Selected Plant Families and were reviewed by H. Maas-van de Kamer and P. Maas-van de Kamer in 2005. In this list, the genera Andruris and Hyalisma are subsumed into Sciaphila and Hexuris is subsumed into Peltophyllum, but two new genera Kupea and Kihansia are included. Both genera were described (and placed in Triuridaceae) in 2003. Mabelia and Nuhliantha are fossil genera that were both described in 2002 from the Turonian of New Jersey. The included genera therefore are:

- Kihansia Cheek
- Kupea Cheek & S.A.Williams
- Lacandonia E.Martínez & Ramos
- †Mabelia Gandolfo, Nixon et Crepet
- †Nuhliantha Gandolfo, Nixon et Crepet
- Peltophyllum Gardner (syn. Hexuris Miers)
- Sciaphila Blume (syn. Hyalisma Champion)
- Seychellaria Hemsl.
- Soridium Miers
- Triuridopsis H.Maas & Maas
- Triuris Miers

- Triuridaceae
  - - Kihansia
    - Kupea
  - - - Seychellaria
      - - Sciaphila
        - Soridium
    - - Peltophyllum
      - - Triuridopsis
        - - Triuris
          - Lacandonia
