= Coaxana =

Scientific classification
- Kingdom: Plantae
- Clade: Tracheophytes
- Clade: Angiosperms
- Clade: Eudicots
- Clade: Asterids
- Order: Apiales
- Family: Apiaceae
- Tribe: Selineae
- Genus: Coaxana; J.M.Coult. & Rose

Species
- Coaxana bambusioides Mathias & Constance; Coaxana purpurea J.M.Coult. & Rose

Genus of flowering plants

Coaxana is a genus of flowering plant in the family Apiaceae, native to Mexico, Guatemala and Honduras. It has two species.
