= Salix dibapha =

Scientific classification
- Kingdom: Plantae
- Clade: Tracheophytes
- Clade: Angiosperms
- Clade: Eudicots
- Clade: Rosids
- Order: Malpighiales
- Family: Salicaceae
- Genus: Salix
- Species: S. dibapha

Binomial name
- Salix dibapha C.K.Schneid.

Shrub in the genus of willows

Salix dibapha is a shrub from the genus of willow (Salix) with mostly 4 to 6 centimeters long leaf blades. The natural range of the species is in China.

== Description ==
Salix dibapha grows as a shrub up to 4 meters high. The twigs are black-brown, glabrous or hairy at first and later balding. The leaves have a 4 to 7 millimeter long petiole. The leaf blade is ovate or elliptical or oblong-elliptical, 4 to 6 rarely to 8 centimeters long and 1.4 to 2 rarely to 2.4 centimeters wide. The leaf margin is entire, the leaf base wedge-shaped or almost rounded, the leaf end pointed or pointed. The upper side of the leaf is greenish or green, the underside whitish, both sides are bare.

The male inflorescences are not known. The female catkins have an inflorescence stalk about 5 millimeters long and 1 centimeter long when the fruit is ripe, with sometimes only one, usually two or three small leaves that can fall off early. The bracts are dark brown or yellowish green, elliptical-oblong, obovate or obovate-oblong with a blunt or almost pointed end. The underside is shaggy hairy and ciliate or sparsely shaggy hairy, sometimes balding towards the tip. The top of the leaf is bare. Female flowers have an adaxial or an adaxial and an abaxial nectar gland. The glands are entire or split. TheOvary is narrowly ovoid, about 2 millimeters long, sessile and hairy white downy. The stylus is about a third to half the length of the ovary and bilobed to split. The scar is split. The fruits are about 4 millimeter long capsules with or without a short stem. Salix dibapha flowers before or with the leaf shoots in April, the fruits ripen from May to June.

== Range ==
The natural range is in the Chinese province of Gansu, in the northwest of Yunnan, and in the east of Tibet. There the species grows on mountain slopes, on sandy banks and near the water at altitudes of 2600 to 3100 meters.

== Taxonomy ==
Salix dibapha is a species from the genus of willows (Salix) in the willow family (Salicaceae). There, it is the section Eriocladae assigned. It was first scientifically described in 1917 by Camillo Karl Schneider in The Botanical Gazette.

There are two varieties:

- Salix dibapha var. Biglandulosa C.F.Fang with bare branches, an approximately 5 mm long peduncle, yellowish green, inverted-egg-shaped or obovate-elongated hand under sparse villous support hairy leaves and zweidrüsigen female flowers. The variety blooms in June and July.
- Salix dibapha var. Dibapha with initially daunig hairy and later verkahlenden branches, one about 1 centimeter long peduncle, dark brown, elliptical-oblong, unterseits shaggy haired and ciliated and sometimes towards the tip verkahlenden bracts and only eindrüsigen female flowers.

== Literature ==
- Wu Zheng-yi, Peter H. Raven (Ed.): Flora of China. Volume 4: Cycadaceae through Fagaceae. Science Press / Missouri Botanical Garden Press, Beijing / St. Louis 1999, ISBN 0-915279-70-3, pp. 234, 236 (English).
