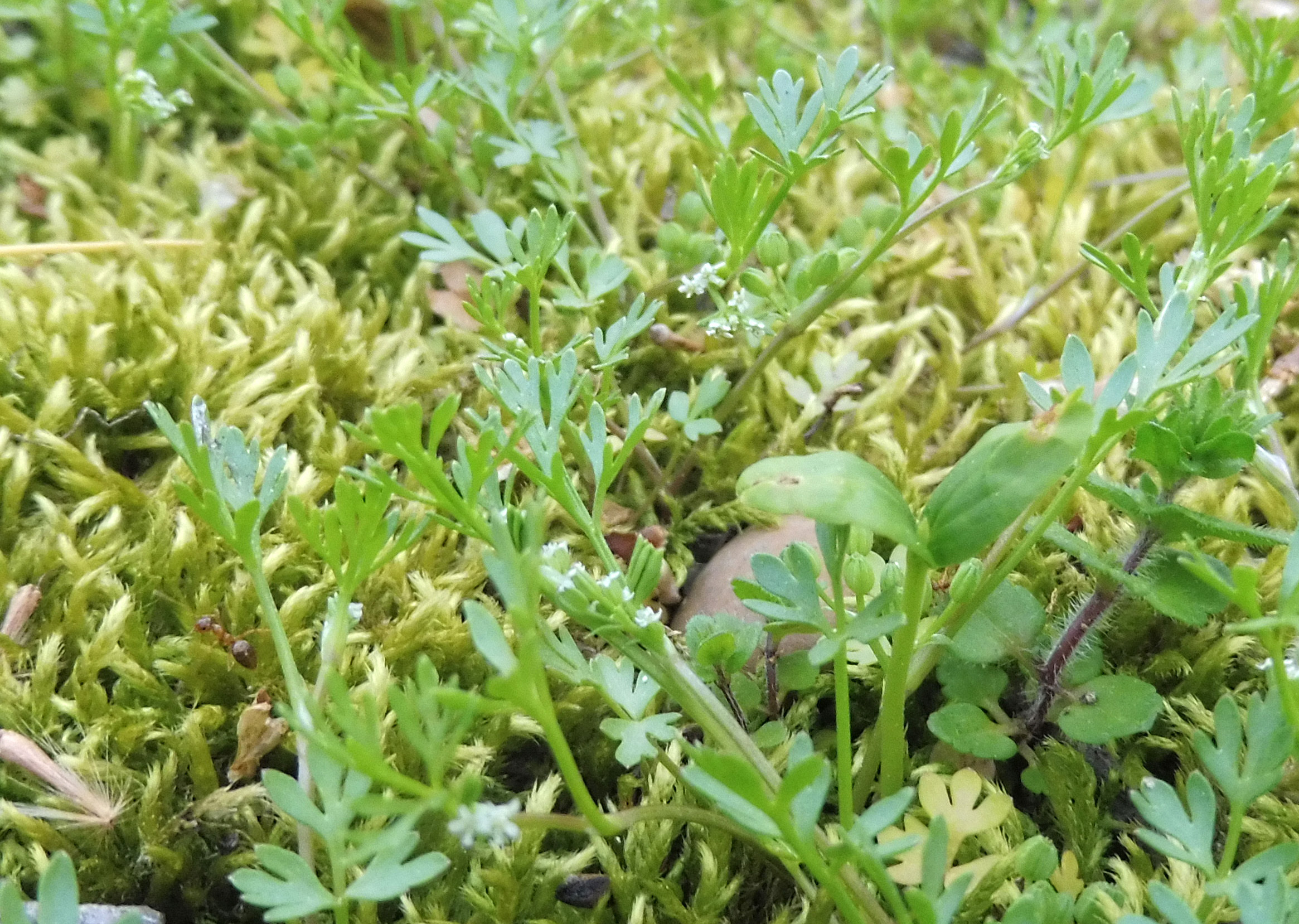

Scientific classification
- Kingdom: Plantae
- Clade: Tracheophytes
- Clade: Angiosperms
- Clade: Eudicots
- Clade: Asterids
- Order: Apiales
- Family: Apiaceae
- Genus: Ammoselinum
- Species: A. butleri

Binomial name
- Ammoselinum butleri (Engelm. ex S. Watson) J.M. Coult. & Rose

= Ammoselinum butleri =

Species of plant

Ammoselinum butleria, commonly called the Butler's sandparsley, is a species of flowering plant in the carrot family (Apiaceae). It is native to North America, where it is found primarily in the South Central United States. It is most often found in disturbed sandy areas, including lawns. Its range has expanded eastward in recent times, leading some authorities to consider populations east of the Mississippi River to be non-native.

== Description ==
Ammoselinum butleri is small annual, usually reaching no more than 5 cm (2.0 in) high (rarely up to 12 cm (4.7 in)). It has leaves that are decompound, and divided into linear segments. It blooms in the spring, where it produces small umbels of flowers in the axils of stem leaves. In contrast to the similar Ammoselinum popei, the fruits of Ammoselinum butleri are nearly smooth.
