= Charles Chamberlain =

Charles Chamberlain may refer to:

- Charles E. Chamberlain (1917–2002), U.S. Representative from Michigan
- Charles H. Chamberlain (1841–1894), Civil War veteran and author of the Illinois (state song)
- Charles Joseph Chamberlain (1863–1943), American botanist
- Charles R. Chamberlain (born 1969), American political leader
