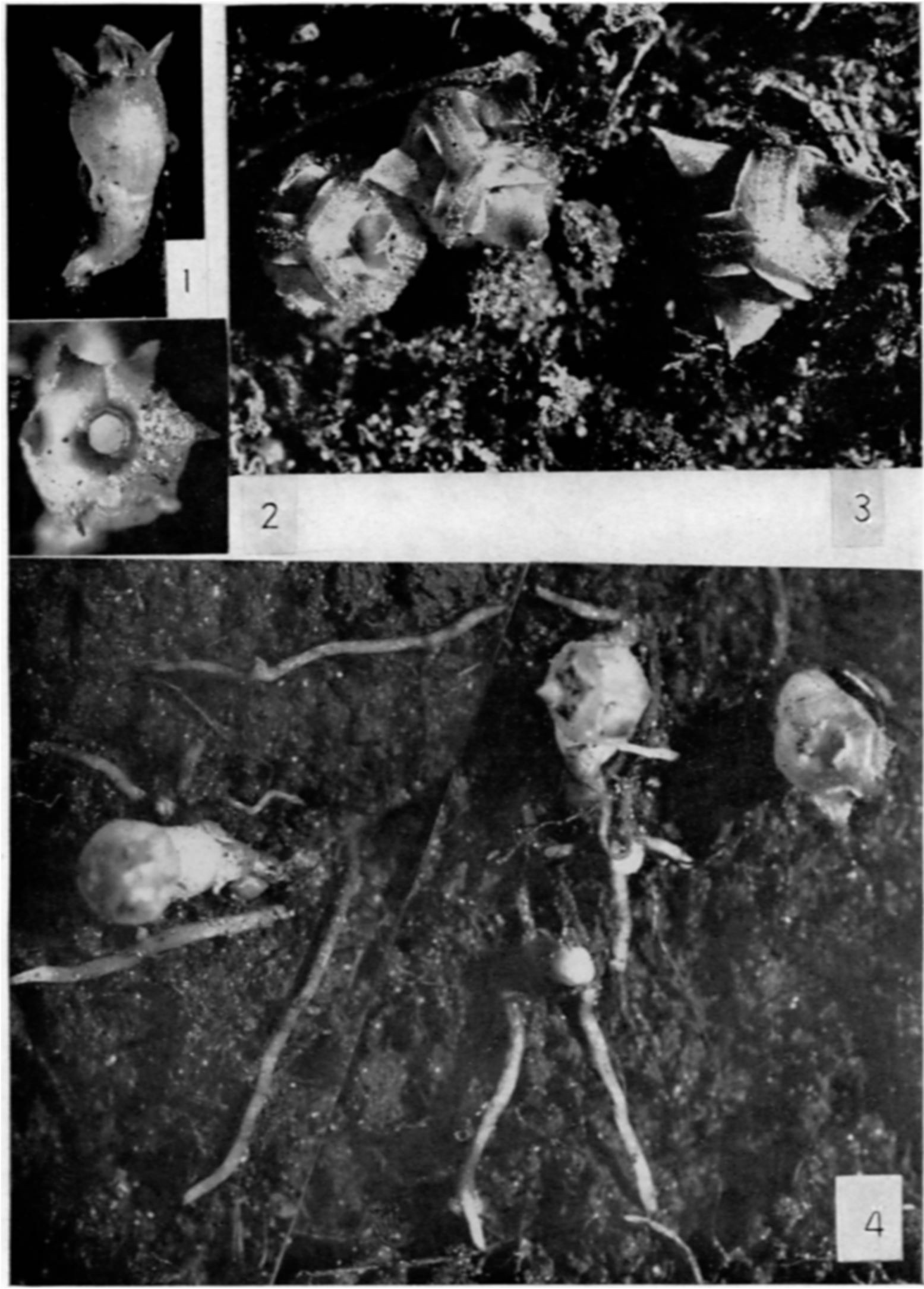

Conservation status
- Possibly Extinct (NatureServe)

Scientific classification
- Kingdom: Plantae
- Clade: Tracheophytes
- Clade: Angiosperms
- Clade: Monocots
- Order: Dioscoreales
- Family: Burmanniaceae
- Genus: Thismia
- Species: T. americana

Binomial name
- Thismia americana N.Pfeiff.

Synonyms
- Sarcosiphon americanus (N.Pfeiff.) Schltr.

= Thismia americana =

Species of plant

Thismia americana, known as thismia or banded Trinity, was a species of flowering plant that was first discovered in 1912 by Norma Etta Pfeiffer in the wetlands surrounding Chicago's Lake Calumet, and described by her in 1914. The type specimen was found in what was then a wet-mesic sand prairie at 119th Street and Torrence Avenue in what would become the industrial neighborhood of South Deering. The plant has not been seen since 1916, and the ground where it was observed has since been extensively altered by industrial development. The species is believed to be extinct. Several extensive searches have not uncovered any living specimens of the vanished species.

Although occasionally regarded as a hoax, preserved specimens exist. One was located in the Naturalis Biodiversity Center in the Netherlands in 2022. In the 1980s, one of Pfeiffer's specimens had been sent to the Utrecht herbarium, but it went missing after the collection moved to a new site in 2006. This was located when staff undertook delayed maintenance and curation during the COVID-19 epidemic.

== Life cycle ==
Thismia americana drew interest from botanists because of its extremely specialized ecological niche. T. americana lacked chlorophyll. Instead of converting solar energy, the flowering plant was a mycoheterotroph, utilizing local fungi of the southern Lake Michigan wetlands for its nourishment. The plant enjoyed a short, shy life cycle above ground; in July, its roots would sprout a tiny flowering head, which produced a white flower the size of a pea.

The description of Thismia americana was published by University of Chicago student Norma Etta Pfeiffer in the Botanical Gazette and reprinted in her doctoral thesis Morphology of Thismia americana. She became the first and only scientist to collect the species. By examining the plant's morphology, Pfeiffer determined that it was a species of the genus Thismia, a genus that at the time was believed to occur only in the Southern Hemisphere. No one knows how this isolated population survived in North America until historic times.

== See also ==
- Thismia kobensis
