= Thismia abei =

Scientific classification
- Kingdom: Plantae
- Clade: Tracheophytes
- Clade: Angiosperms
- Clade: Monocots
- Order: Dioscoreales
- Family: Burmanniaceae
- Genus: Thismia
- Species: T. abei

Binomial name
- Thismia abei (Smith, 1858)

Species of plant

Thismia abei is a species of plant in the genus Thismia. It does not produce chlorophyll, and is found in plant litter on the ground of evergreen forests. Its native location ranges from South Japan to the Izu Islands.
