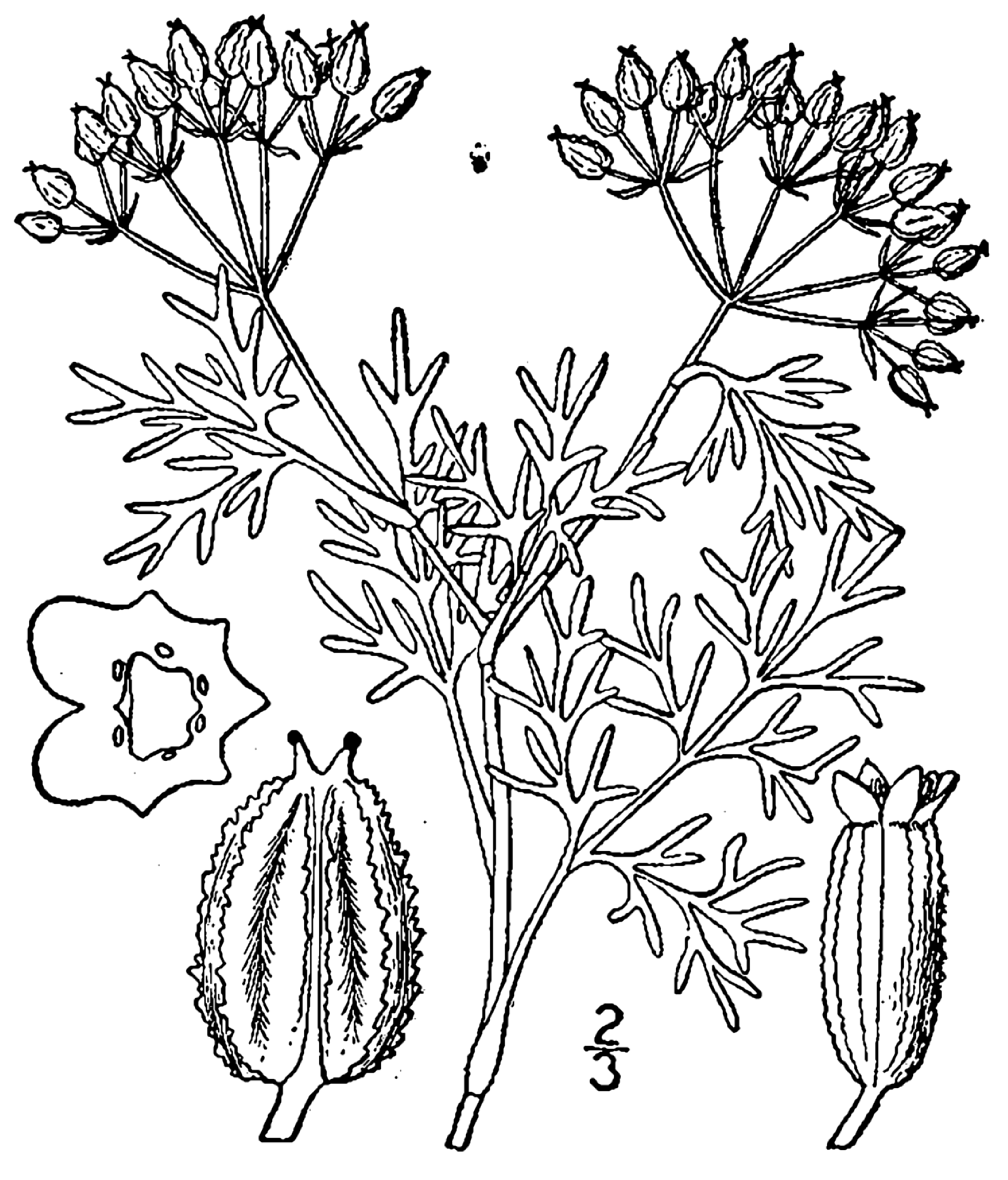
- Ammoselinum popei

Scientific classification
- Kingdom: Plantae
- Clade: Tracheophytes
- Clade: Angiosperms
- Clade: Eudicots
- Clade: Asterids
- Order: Apiales
- Family: Apiaceae
- Subfamily: Apioideae
- Tribe: Selineae
- Genus: Ammoselinum; Torr. & A.Gray

Species
- See text.

= Ammoselinum =

Sandparsley

Genus of flowering plant

Ammoselinum is a genus of flowering plant in the family Apiaceae, known commonly as sandparsley. It is native to temperate North and South America.

Species:

- Ammoselinum butleri (Engelm. ex S.Watson) J.M.Coult. & Rose – Butler's sandparsley
- Ammoselinum occidentale Munz & I.M.Johnst.
- Ammoselinum popei orr. & A.Gray – plains sandparsley
- Ammoselinum rosengurtii Mathias & Constance
