= Thismia hawkesii =

Fairy lantern

Conservation status
- Least Concern (NCA)

Scientific classification
- Kingdom: Plantae
- Clade: Tracheophytes
- Clade: Angiosperms
- Clade: Monocots
- Order: Dioscoreales
- Family: Burmanniaceae
- Genus: Thismia
- Species: T. hawkesii

Binomial name
- Thismia hawkesii W.E.Cooper

Species of flowering plant

Thismia hawkesii, commonly known as fairy lantern, is a plant in the family Burmanniaceae found only in the Wet Tropics bioregion of Queensland, Australia.

== Description ==
Thismia hawkesii is a small underground herb and an obligate myco-heterotroph, that is, it lacks chlorophyll and relies on a symbiotic association with fungi to obtain its nutrients. The roots, stem and leaves of the plant remain underground and only the flower appears above ground. The leaves are white and measure up to 3.5 mm long by 1 mm wide. The flowers are solitary and are 18–26 mm long by 5–6 mm wide. The fruit is a capsule about 4.5 mm long by 7.5 mm wide, containing numerous seeds.

== Taxonomy ==
This species was first described by the Australian botanist Wendy Elizabeth Cooper, and published in the journal Austrobaileya in 2017. The species epithet hawkesii honours the naturalist and field assistant Tim Hawkes.

== Distribution and habitat ==
As of June 2024, it is only known from collections in the Baldy Mountain Forest Reserve, west of Atherton, Queensland.

== Conservation ==
Despite its extremely limited known range, Thismia hawkesii is listed as least concern under the Queensland Government's Nature Conservation Act. As of 21 June 2024, it has not been assessed by the International Union for Conservation of Nature (IUCN).
