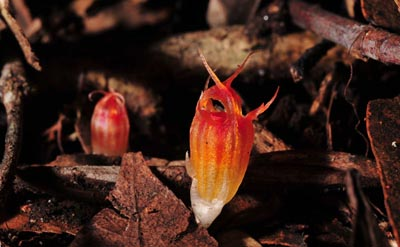

Scientific classification
- Kingdom: Plantae
- Clade: Tracheophytes
- Clade: Angiosperms
- Clade: Monocots
- Order: Dioscoreales
- Family: Burmanniaceae
- Genus: Thismia
- Species: T. megalongensis

Binomial name
- Thismia megalongensis C.Hunt, G.Steenbeeke & V.Merckx

= Thismia megalongensis =

Fairy Lantern

Species of flowering plant

Thismia megalongensis is a seldom seen species of flowering plant in the Burmanniaceae family. It is endemic to the Blue Mountains region, west of Sydney. Described in 2014 from a plant collected from the Megalong Valley.
