= Thismia acuminata =

Scientific classification
- Kingdom: Plantae
- Clade: Tracheophytes
- Clade: Angiosperms
- Clade: Monocots
- Order: Dioscoreales
- Family: Burmanniaceae
- Genus: Thismia
- Species: T. acuminata

Binomial name
- Thismia acuminata Hrones, Dancák & Sochor

Species of plant

Thismia acuminata is a species of plant in the genus Thismia. It was identified in 2018 by Hrones, Dancák and Sochor. It is native to Borneo, and is found throughout South Asia. The plant has a slender stem, with roots ranging from 20 to 80 centimeters long.
