= Thismia hongkongensis =

Scientific classification
- Kingdom: Plantae
- Clade: Tracheophytes
- Clade: Angiosperms
- Clade: Monocots
- Order: Dioscoreales
- Family: Burmanniaceae
- Genus: Thismia
- Species: T. hongkongensis

Binomial name
- Thismia hongkongensis S.S.Mar & R.M.K.Saunders, 2015

Species of flowering plant

Thismia hongkongensis is a species of Thismia. S.S.Mar and R.M.K.Saunders, the discoverers, published their discovery in the journal PhytoKeys on 4 February 2015. This species is endemic to Hong Kong.
