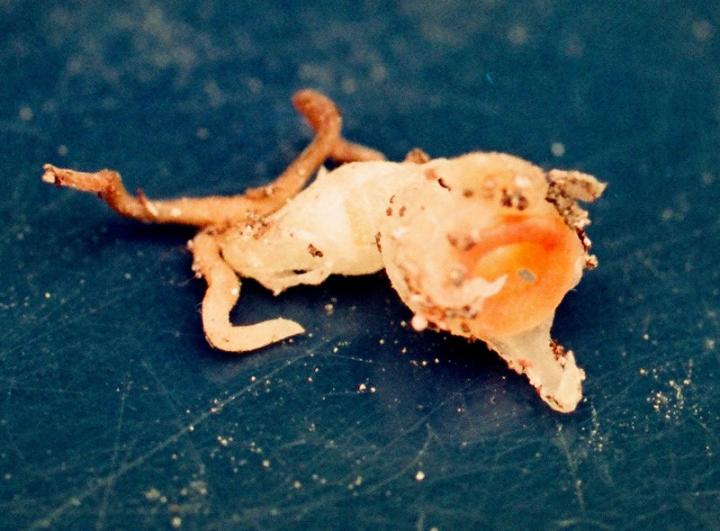
- Holotype specimen after dissection on 10 June 1992

Scientific classification
- Kingdom: Plantae
- Clade: Tracheophytes
- Clade: Angiosperms
- Clade: Monocots
- Order: Dioscoreales
- Family: Burmanniaceae
- Genus: Thismia; Griffith, 1844
- Species: T. kobensis

Binomial name
- Thismia kobensis Suetsugu et al., 2018

= Thismia kobensis =

Species of flowering plant

Thismia kobensis is a species of flowering plant from the Thismia genus in the myco-heterotrophic family Burmanniaceae.

The type and originally only specimen was discovered in Kobe, Japan, in 1992, and preserved without identification, although it was originally assigned to the genus Oxygyne. No new specimens were found in follow-up surveys between 1993 and 1999, and the plant's original habitat was destroyed by land development in 1999. T. kobensis was declared extinct in 2010 due to habitat loss and deforestation. It was described as a species of Thismia in 2018.

In 2021 the plant was rediscovered some 30 km away from the original location. 20 specimens were found in a conifer plantation. News of the rediscovery was published in 2023.

== See also ==
- Thismia americana
