= Thismia aliasii =

Conservation status
- Critically Endangered (IUCN 3.1)

Scientific classification
- Kingdom: Plantae
- Clade: Tracheophytes
- Clade: Angiosperms
- Clade: Monocots
- Order: Dioscoreales
- Family: Burmanniaceae
- Genus: Thismia
- Species: T. aliasii

Binomial name
- Thismia aliasii Siti-Munirah

Species of fairy lantern described in 2025

Thismia aliasii is a species of myco-heterotrophic plant from the genus Thismia. It was formally described in 2025 by Shakri Mohamad Alias after being found in a forest reserve in Gunung Chemerong, Malaysia. Only 5 individual plants have been found, and have been identified by the authors as critically endangered according to the IUCN Red list criteria.

== Discovery ==
Thismia aliasii was discovered during a field trip to Peninsular Malaysia by botanist Shakri Mohamad Alias. Alias stated that they had difficulty obtaining the plant for study due to the mountainous terrain and delays caused by the COVID-19 pandemic. The field trip was funded by the 12th Malaysian Plan, with additional funding provided by the Nagao Research Grant.

== Characteristics ==
Thismia aliasii possesses multiple characteristics that differ from other Thismia species. All of their tepals are equal in size and shape, but with different lengths of their inner and outer tepals. The inner tepals are typically 3 millimeters long, whilst the outer ones range from 26 to 33 millimeters. The plants identified stood at around 11 centimeters tall, comparatively smaller than that of other plants in their genus.

Thismia aliasii does not use photosynthesis to produce their nutrients; they instead use a process called myco-heterotrophy, where they will absorb nutrients from nearby fungi. The roots do not have branches, and average 1.5 millimeters in diameter. The plants rely on small insects called fungus gnats to help facilitate pollination and their reproduction.
