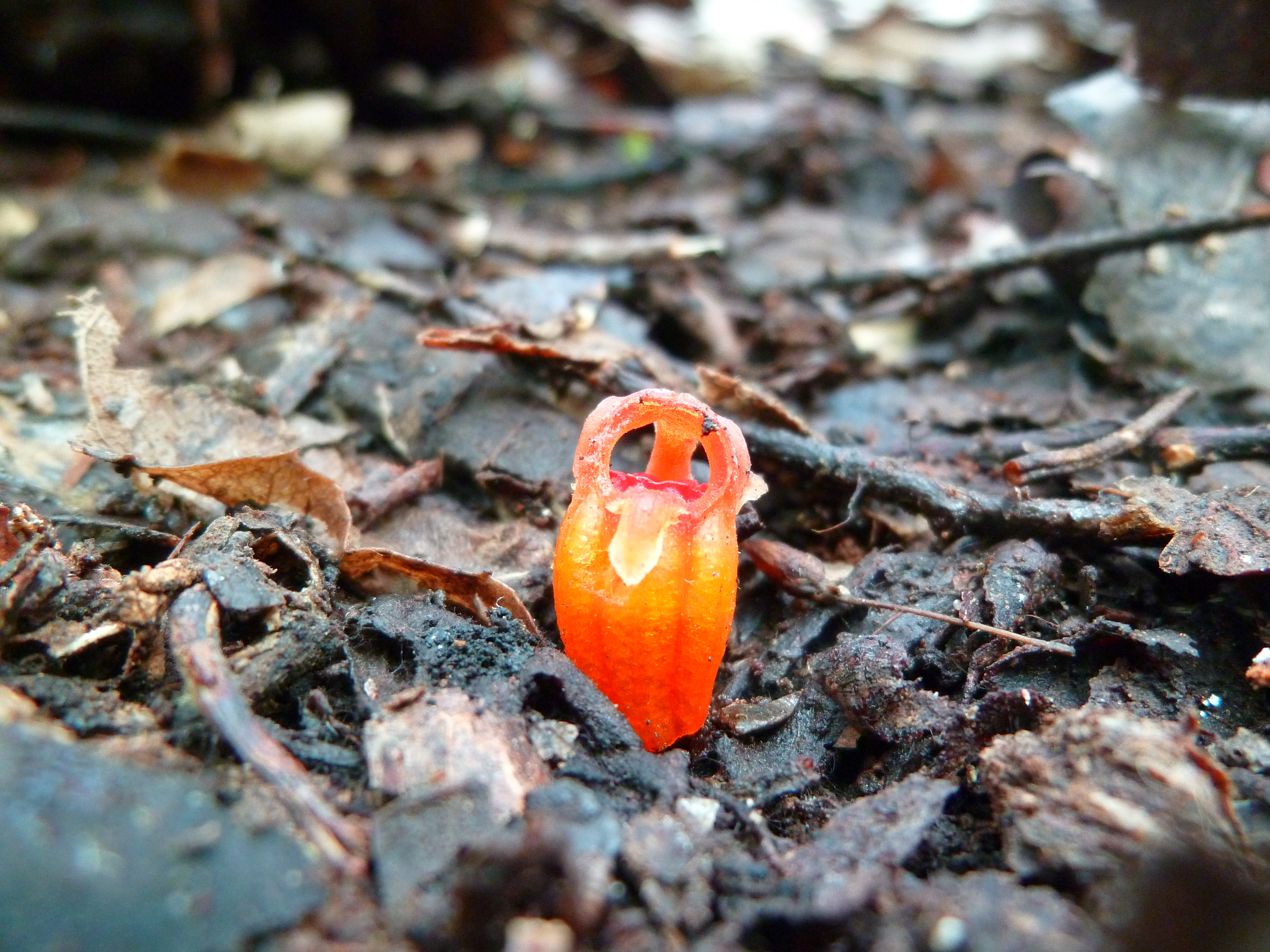

Scientific classification
- Kingdom: Plantae
- Clade: Tracheophytes
- Clade: Angiosperms
- Clade: Monocots
- Order: Dioscoreales
- Family: Burmanniaceae
- Genus: Thismia
- Species: T. rodwayi

Binomial name
- Thismia rodwayi F.Muell., 1890

= Thismia rodwayi =

Species of flowering plant

Thismia rodwayi, also known as a fairy lantern, is a non-chlorophyllous plant belonging to the Burmanniaceae family, found in the Australian states of Tasmania, Victoria and New South Wales, and in several locations in New Zealand.

The small number of known individuals of this species has put it under Schedule 5 (Rare) of the Tasmanian Threatened Species Protection Act 1995. However, Thismia rodwayi is not considered threatened by the International Union for Conservation of Nature (IUCN).

== Biology ==
Thismia rodwayi is a small reddish-yellowish flower – the lantern – seemingly without stem and leaves. The plant most often emerges from the forest floor or lies hidden under the litter. As it does not contain any chlorophyll, the mature plant consists of a flower stalk and roots, both devoid of chlorophyll.

As a mycoheterotroph, Thismia Rodwayi is associated with a fungus, which is the true saprophyte. Its whole life cycle, and especially its reproduction, is still mostly unknown.

=== Description ===
Thismia rodwayi is, as botanist Mark Wapstra puts it, 'aptly described' by its common name: fairy lantern. It is a very small flower, only visible as an orange and red obovate floral tube of 10 to 18 mm in length. This flower is surmounted by six perianth lobes: three inner lobes curving inward, and three outer ones spreading outward.

The flower lies atop a 0.5 to 3 cm long colourless and subterranean flower stem which bears six bracts, increasing in size toward the flower. The flower stem arises from the juncture of the 1 to 1.5 mm thick and 4 to 15 cm long roots.

Each individual plant usually produces only one flower per bloom cycle, occasionally two; plants can be found in groups of 2 to 5 (and up to 12) in an area of less than 1 m^{2}.

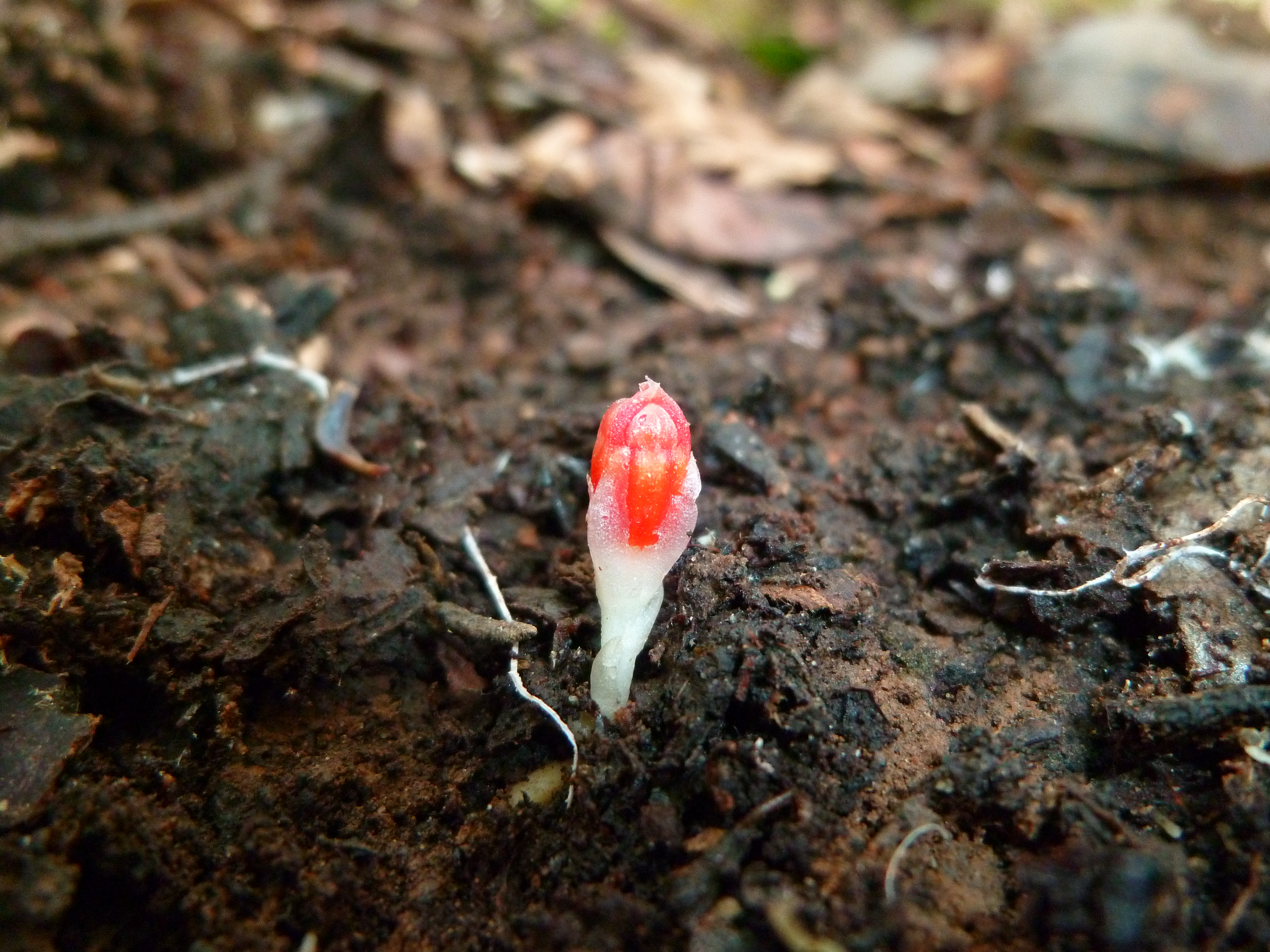
Thismia rodwayi in bud.

=== Autecology ===
Thismia rodwayi occurs in wet eucalyptus forests, mainly Eucalyptus obliqua, E. regnans, E. delegatensis and E. viminalis, between 100 and 650 m above sea level. The potential habitat in Tasmania is estimated with the RFA (Regional Forest Agreement), such as "tall E. obliqua forest" (OT) or "wet E. viminalis forest" (VW). As occurrence data for the species are sparse, the potential habitat is much more widespread than the flower itself.

On a local scale, potential Thismia areas are identified by a sparse canopy cover, and a damp, dense and cohesive topsoil with a thick litterfall.

=== Biological life cycle ===
Thismia rodwayi's life cycle is still very poorly understood. As it usually appears in patches of closely situated individuals, it is generally accepted that both pollen and seeds are transported only short distances, which could explain why the plant occurs in only a fraction of its potential habitat.

There currently exist two main hypotheses concerning the mechanisms of Thismia rodwayi's pollination:

- Entomophily: Fungus gnats could be constrained inside the floral tube, and be forced to exit through the gaps between the anthers, thus coating themselves in pollen.
- Zoophily: Mammals such as the potoroo (Potorous tridactylus) are known to feed on roots and subterranean fungus in similar habitats and could serve as pollinators. Another possible vector could be the superb lyrebird (Menura novaehollandiae).

Vegetative expansion by stolons is also considered a possibility.

=== Mycoheterotrophy ===
Although earlier regarded as a saprophyte, Thismia rodwayi is actually a mycoheterotroph, a non-chlorophyllous plant associated with a truly saprophytic fungus. The fungal hyphae are found in the cortical cells of the plant's roots, and also around those roots.

Nutrients in rotting organic material are absorbed by the fungus and stocked as fat globules in the hyphal bladders of the fungus. The hyphal cells are then induced to discharge the fat globules into the cells of the plant, where they are turned into a polysaccharide, possibly glycogen.

== Rarity and protection ==
Because of the anecdotal occurrence data concerning this plant, Thismia rodwayi is not listed by the IUCN. It is, however, listed on Schedule 5 (Rare) of the Tasmanian Threatened Species Protection Act 1995 under criterion B (species subject to stochastic risk of endangerment because of naturally small population sizes).

One of the main difficulties in obtaining new data is the covert nature of the plant: although brightly coloured, it is often covered by litterfall, and non-specific botanical surveys have a high probability of missing it. Improved surveys, however, have been increasingly successful in detecting Thismia rodwayi, and the amount of data is growing.

Although most potential habitat zones are protected by being located in national parks, riparian reserves or other protected areas, Thismia rodwayi may not be negatively impacted by normal native forest silvicultural operations such as clearfelling, selective cutting, or even regeneration burning. On the other hand, a conversion to monospecific plantations may be deleterious to plant populations.
