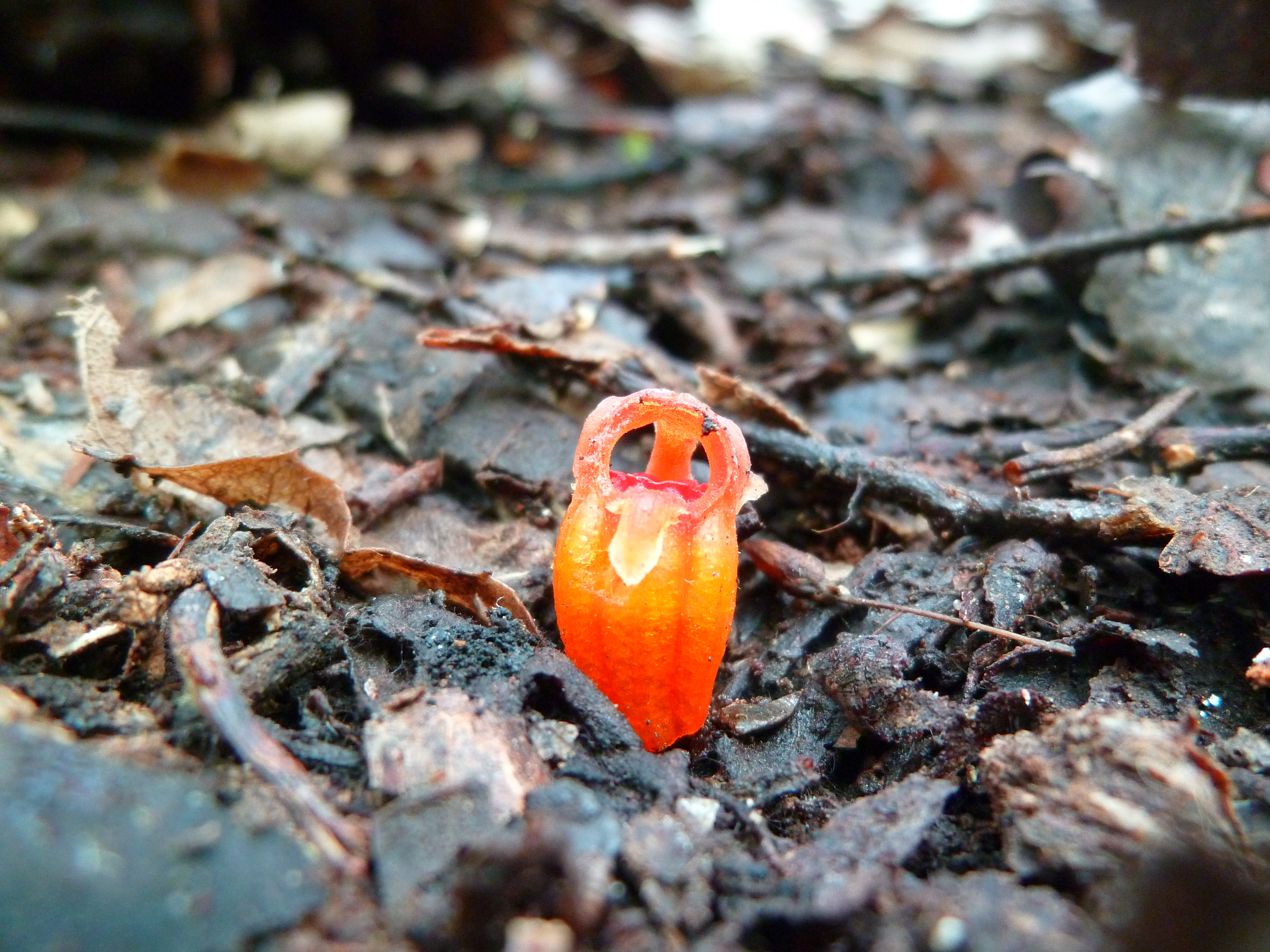
- Thismia rodwayi

Scientific classification
- Kingdom: Plantae
- Clade: Tracheophytes
- Clade: Angiosperms
- Clade: Monocots
- Order: Dioscoreales
- Family: Burmanniaceae
- Genus: Thismia; Griff.

Type species
- Thismia brunonis Griff.

Species
- See text

Synonyms
- Bagnisia Becc.; Geomitra Becc.; Glaziocharis Taub. ex Warm.; Mamorea de la Sota; Myostoma Miers; Ophiomeris Miers; Rodwaya F.Muell.; Sarcosiphon Blume; Scaphiophora Schltr.; Tribrachys Champ. ex Thwaites; Triscyphus Taub.; Triurocodon Schltr.

= Thismia =

Genus of plants

Thismia is a genus of myco-heterotrophic plants in family Burmanniaceae, known as "fairy lanterns". They are native to East and Southeast Asia, New Guinea, Australia, New Zealand, and the Americas.

== Description ==
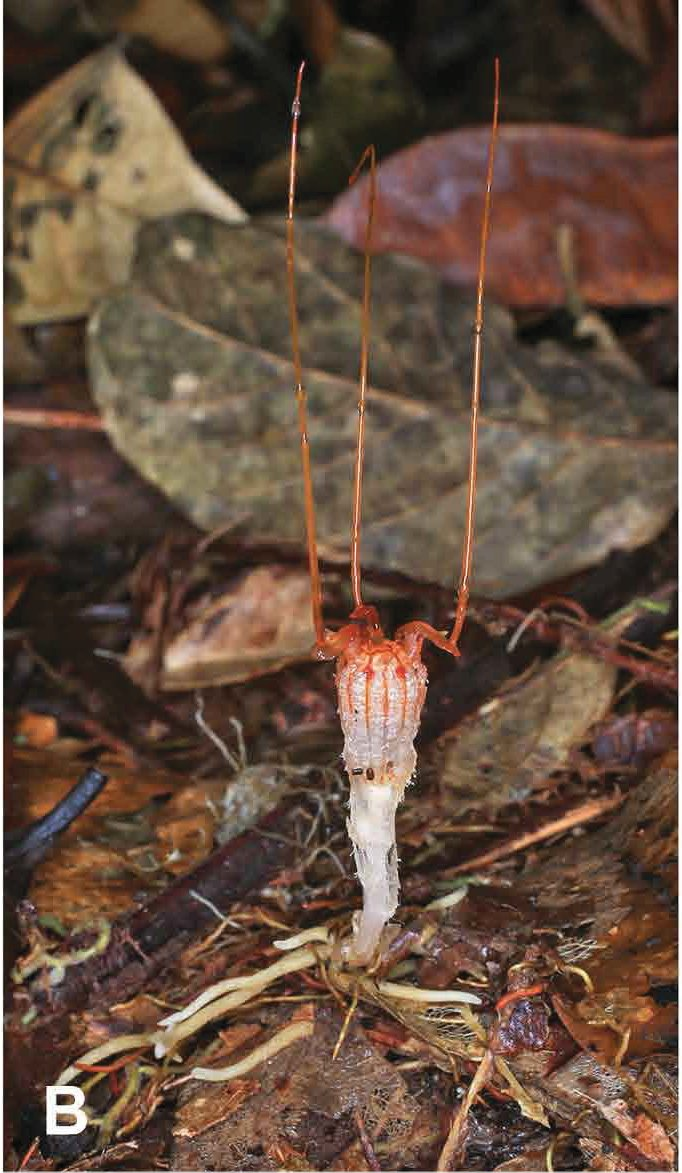
Thismia neptunis

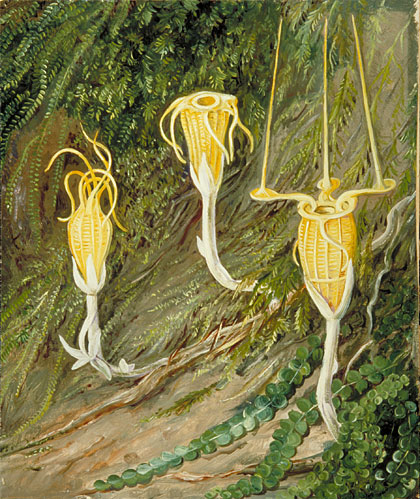
Thismia neptunis painted by Marianne North

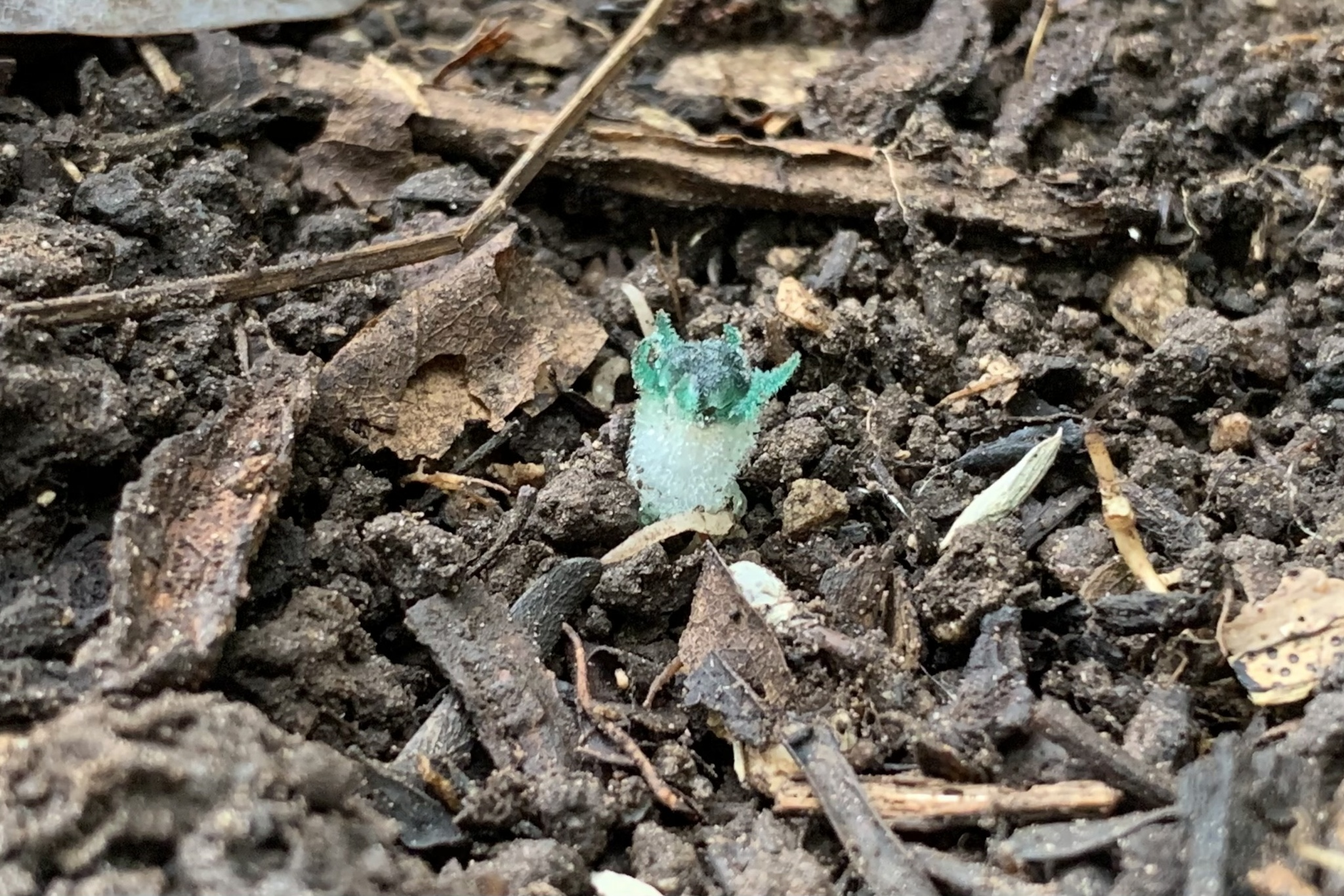
Thismia thaithongiana

Thismia are perennial, achlorophyllous, mycoheterotrophic, tuberous plants with branched or simple stems. The 1–4 terminal, solitary flowers are erect. The androecium consists of 6 stamens. The gynoecium consists of one carpel.

== Name ==
The generic name Thismia refers to Thomas Smith (English microscopist, died ca. 1825). It is an anagram of his name.

== Conservation ==
Most Thismia species are threatened with extinction and many species are only known from very few collections. For instance, the IUCN conservation status of Thismia melanomitra is Vulnerable (VU), Thismia malayana is categorized as Vulnerable (VU), Thismia kobensis, which was previously believed to be extinct, is now categorized as Critically Endangered (CR), and Thismia americana is believed to be possibly extinct.

== Ecology ==
The flowers of Thismia tentaculata are pollinated by fungus gnats. The flowers of Thismia hongkongensis are visited by fungus gnats and scuttle flies.

== Cytology ==
The chromosome count of Thismia huangii is 2n = 18. The chromosome count of Thismia abei is 2n = 12.

== Taxonomy ==
It was published by William Griffith in 1845 with Thismia brunonis Griff. as the type species.

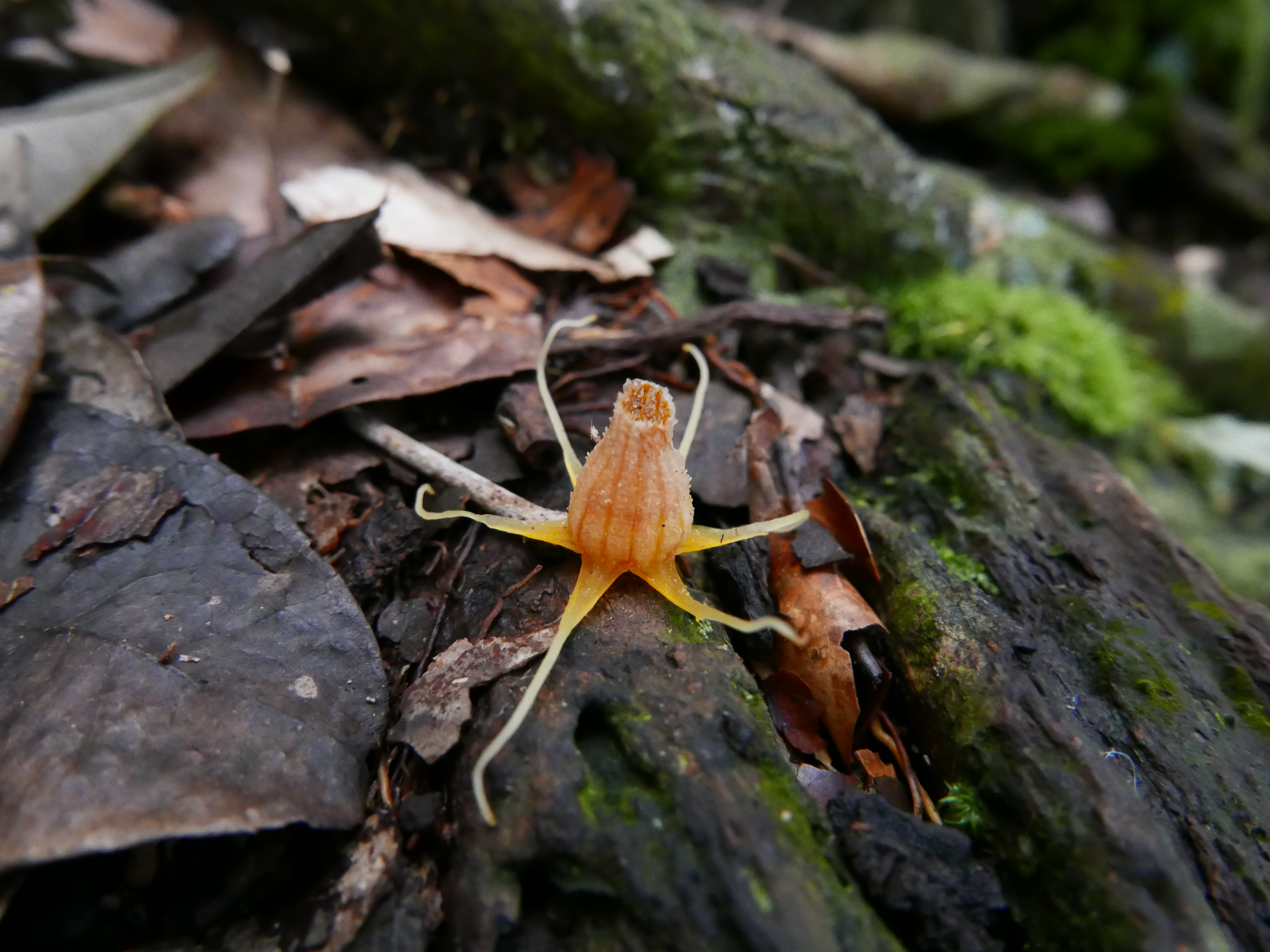
Thismia sp. in Sarawak, Borneo

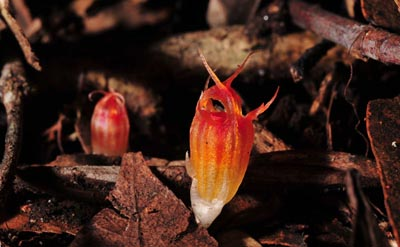
Thismia megalongensis

=== Species ===
As of June 2024, Plants of the World Online recognised 108 species in this genus, as follows:

- Thismia abei (Akasawa) Hatus.
- Thismia acuminata Hrones, Dancák & Sochor
- Thismia alba Holttum ex Jonker
- Thismia americana N.Pfeiff.
- Thismia andicola Aguilar-Cano, S.Guzm.-Guzm. & Lopera-Toro
- Thismia angustimitra Chantanaorr.
- Thismia annamensis K.Larsen & Aver.
- Thismia appendiculata Schltr.
- Thismia arachnites Ridl.
- Thismia aseroe Becc.
- Thismia aurantiaca Hareesh & M.Sabu
- Thismia belumensis Siti-Munirah & Suhaimi-Miloko
- Thismia betung-kerihunensis Tsukaya & H.Okada
- Thismia bifida M.Hotta
- Thismia bokorensis Suetsugu & Tsukaya
- Thismia breviappendiculata Nob.Tanaka
- Thismia brunneomitra Hrones, Kobrlová & Dancák
- Thismia brunneomitroides Suetsugu & Tsukaya
- Thismia brunonis Griff.
- Thismia bryndonii Tsukaya, Suetsugu & Suleiman
- Thismia calcarata D.F.Silva, Honório & J.M.A.Braga
- Thismia caudata Maas & H.Maas
- Thismia chrysops Ridl.
- Thismia clandestina (Blume) Miq.
- Thismia clavarioides K.R.Thiele
- Thismia claviformis Chantanaorr. & J.Wai
- Thismia clavigera (Becc.) F.Muell.
- Thismia clavigeroides Chantanaorr. & Seelanan
- Thismia cordata D.F.Silva & J.M.A.Braga
- Thismia cornuta Hrones, Sochor & Dancák
- Thismia coronata Hrones, Dancák & Sochor
- Thismia crocea (Becc.) J.J.Sm.
- Thismia domei Siti-Munirah
- Thismia episcopalis (Becc.) F.Muell.
- Thismia espirito-santensis Brade
- Thismia filiformis Chantanaorr.
- Thismia fumida Ridl.
- Thismia fungiformis (Taub. ex Warm.) Maas & H.Maas
- Thismia gardneriana Hook.f. ex Thwaites
- Thismia gigantea (Jonker) Hroneš
- Thismia glaziovii Poulsen
- Thismia gongshanensis Hong Qing Li & Y.K.Bi
- Thismia goodii Kiew
- Thismia grandiflora Ridl.
- Thismia guangdongensis Xiao J.Li, A.Liu & D.X.Zhang
- Thismia hawkesii W.E.Cooper
- Thismia hexagona Dančák, Hroneš, Kobrlová & Sochor
- Thismia hongkongensis Mar & R.M.K.Saunders
- Thismia huangii P.Y.Jiang & T.H.Hsieh
- Thismia hyalina (Miers) Benth. & Hook.f. ex F.Muell.
- Thismia iguassuensis (Miers) Warm.
- Thismia inconspicua Sochor & Dancák
- Thismia janeirensis Warm.
- Thismia javanica J.J.Sm.
- Thismia jianfenglingensis Han Xu, H.J.Yang & S.Q.Fang
- Thismia kelabitiana Dančák, Hroneš & Sochor
- Thismia kelantanensis Siti-Munirah
- Thismia kenyirensis Siti-Munirah & Dome
- Thismia kinabaluensis T.Nishioka & Suetsugu
- Thismia kobensis Suetsugu
- Thismia labiata J.J.Sm.
- Thismia laevis Sochor, Dancák & Hrones
- Thismia lanternata W.E.Cooper
- Thismia latiffiana Siti-Munirah & Dome
- Thismia lauriana Jarvie
- Thismia limkokthayi Siti-Munirah & E.Chan
- Thismia luetzelburgii Goebel & Suess.
- Thismia macahensis (Miers) F.Muell.
- Thismia mantiqueirensis Engels & E.C.Smidt
- Thismia megalongensis C.A.Hunt, G.Steenbee. & V.Merckx
- Thismia melanomitra Maas & H.Maas
- Thismia minutissima Dančák, Hroneš & Sochor
- Thismia mirabilis K.Larsen
- Thismia mucronata Nuraliev
- Thismia mullerensis Tsukaya & H.Okada
- Thismia neptunis Becc.
- Thismia nigra Dančák, Hroneš & Sochor
- Thismia nigricans Chantanaorr. & Sridith
- Thismia nigricoronata Kumar & S.W.Gale
- Thismia okhaensis Luu, Tich, G.Tran & Dinh
- Thismia ophiuris Becc.
- Thismia ornata Dančák, Hroneš & Sochor
- Thismia pallida Hrones, Dancák & Rejzek
- Thismia panamensis (Standl.) Jonker
- Thismia paradisiaca S.Guzm.-Guzm.
- Thismia petasiformis D.F.Silva & J.M.A.Braga
- Thismia prataensis Mancinelli, C.T.Blum & E.C.Smidt
- Thismia pseudomelanomitra D.F.Silva & J.M.A.Braga
- Thismia puberula Nuraliev
- Thismia racemosa Ridl.
- Thismia ribeiroi Engels, D.F.Silva & Soares-Lopes
- Thismia rodwayi F.Muell.
- Thismia sahyadrica Sujanapal, Robi & Dantas
- Thismia saulensis H.Maas & Maas
- Thismia singeri (de la Sota) Maas & H.Maas
- Thismia sitimeriamiae Siti-Munirah, Dome & Thorogood
- Thismia submucronata Chantanaorr., Tetsana & Tripetch
- Thismia sumatrana Suetsugu & Tsukaya
- Thismia taiwanensis Sheng Z.Yang, R.M.K.Saunders & C.J.Hsu
- Thismia tectipora Cowie
- Thismia tentaculata K.Larsen & Aver.
- Thismia terengganuensis Siti-Munirah
- Thismia thaithongiana Chantanaorr. & Suddee
- Thismia tuberculata Hatus.
- Thismia variabilis D.F.Silva, Honório & J.M.A.Braga
- Thismia violacea D.F.Silva & J.M.A.Braga
- Thismia viridistriata Sochor, Hrones & Dancák
- Thismia yorkensis Cribb

Recently described species include:

2024

- Thismia malayana Siti-Munirah, Hardy-Adrian, Mohamad-Shafiq & Irwan-Syah
- Thismia malipoensis J. D. Ya & W. B. Yu
- Thismia papillata Nuraliev et al.
- Thismia perlisensis Besi & Rusea

2025

- Thismia aliasii Siti-Munirah & Alias

- Thismia dasyantha Dančák, Sochor & Hroneš
- Thismia velaris Dančák, Sochor & Hroneš
- Thismia selangorensis Siti-Munirah, Siew, Mat-Tahir, & Azhar

2026

- Thismia daemona Seelanan & Chantaorr
