= Thismia melanomitra =

Conservation status
- Vulnerable (IUCN 3.1)

Scientific classification
- Kingdom: Plantae
- Clade: Tracheophytes
- Clade: Angiosperms
- Clade: Monocots
- Order: Dioscoreales
- Family: Burmanniaceae
- Genus: Thismia
- Species: T. melanomitra

Binomial name
- Thismia melanomitra Maas & H.Maas

Species of flowering plant

Thismia melanomitra is a species of plant in the Burmanniaceae family. It is endemic to Ecuador. Its natural habitat is subtropical or tropical moist lowland forests. It is threatened by habitat loss.
