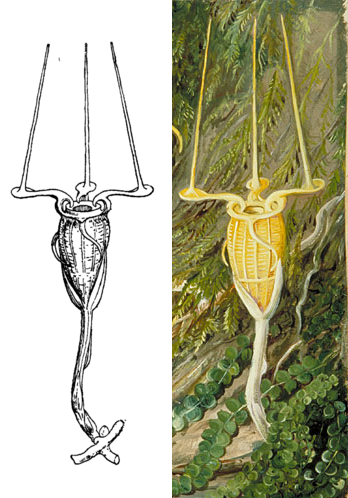
- Left: Beccari's original illustration. Right: North's painting based on the original illustration.

Scientific classification
- Kingdom: Plantae
- Clade: Tracheophytes
- Clade: Angiosperms
- Clade: Monocots
- Order: Dioscoreales
- Family: Burmanniaceae
- Genus: Thismia
- Species: T. neptunis

Binomial name
- Thismia neptunis Becc.

= Thismia neptunis =

Species of flowering plant

Thismia neptunis is a species of Thismia endemic to Borneo. It was discovered by Italian botanist Odoardo Beccari in 1866, and described in 1878. It was not observed again until 2017, when it was first photographed by a team of biologists from the Czech Republic. It was found in the Gunung Matang massif in western Sarawak, in the Malaysian part of the island of Borneo.

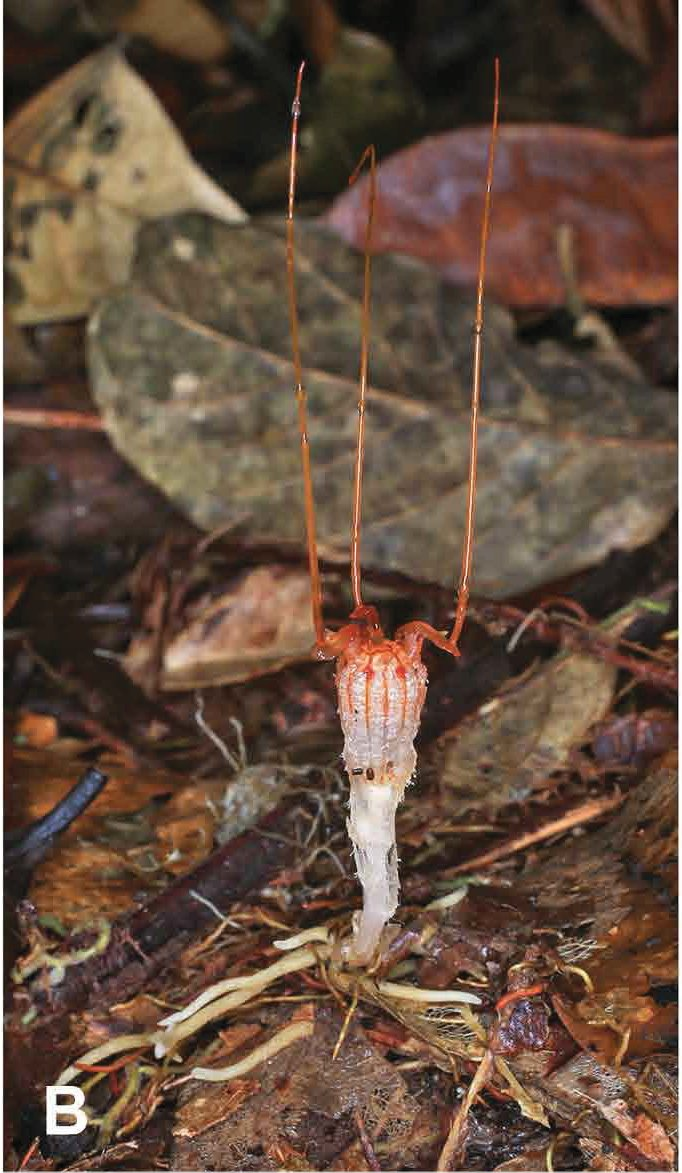
Thismia neptunis

T. neptunis lives underground, and is a myco-heterotroph, a plant which obtains nutrients through a parasitic relationship with fungi. It does not bloom every year, and when it does, its flower appears above the soil for only a few weeks.
