= Norma Etta Pfeiffer =

American botanist (1889-1989)

- Born: 1889; Chicago, IL
- Died: 23 August 1989 (aged 99–100); Dallas, TX
- Education: University of Chicago
- Scientific career
- Fields: Botany
- Workplaces: University of North Dakota, Boyce Thompson Institute
- Thesis: Morphology of Thismia americana (1913)
- Doctoral advisor: John M. Coulter

Norma Etta Pfeiffer (1889–1989) was an American botanist who specialized in the study of lilies and Isoetes. She discovered and described the Chicago-endemic flowering plant species Thismia americana described in her doctoral thesis in 1913.

== Education ==
She studied for her B.S. degree at the University of Chicago and it was awarded in 1909. She continued with doctoral research, with her Ph.D. awarded in 1913. During these studies she was elected to both Phi Beta Kappa and the Society of Sigma Xi.

Her Ph.D. described a new plant species, Thismia americana. She described its habitat in wetlands surrounding Chicago's Lake Calumet. The type specimen was found in what was then a wet-mesic sand prairie at 119th Street and Torrence Avenue in what would become the industrial neighborhood of South Deering. The plant has not been seen since 1916, and the ground where it was observed has since been extensively altered by industrial development. The species is believed to be extinct.

== Career ==
=== University of North Dakota ===
Before being awarded her doctorate, she was employed part-time at the University of North Dakota, and continued to hold an appointment in botany at the university for a decade. During the first year (1912–13) she also worked as governess to the daughters of the Dean of the College of Liberal Arts, Melvin A. Brannon. She was appointed as assistant professor in botany in 1915 and associate professor in 1922. Pfeiffer was an active member of the university, as well as a scientific researcher. In 1918 she volunteered at the hospital set up by the university for women students during the influenza pandemic, and eventually ran it. In 1919 she was one of the founding members of the Associated Teachers of the State University of North Dakota, a local chapter of the American Federation of Teachers. She was elected President of the North Dakota Academy of Science for 1922 - 23. Pfeiffer spent the fall semester of 1922 researching at the University of Wisconsin. Her Monograph of the Isoetaceae published in 1922, was the major result of this time and remained a standard reference into the twenty-first century. She undertook her teaching at University of North Dakota in the second semester, and then resigned. She was one of several faculty who were dissatisfied with the university's president, Thomas F. Kane, and this may have been a factor in her resignation. Pfeiffer then spent the rest of 1923 and part of 1924 on the family farm of a colleague, Zella Colvin, who had also resigned.

== Boyce Thompson Institute for Plant Research ==
In 1924 Pfeiffer was offered a post at the new Boyce Thompson Institute for Plant Research in New York. Her appointment was as a plant morphologist. She specialised in developing new varieties of lilies and remained at the institute until her retirement in 1954.

She lived in Yonkers, New York until moving to Dallas, Texas in her 90s, where she remained until her death.

The standard author abbreviation N.Pfeiff. is used to indicate this person as the author when citing a botanical name.

== Works ==
- Pfeiffer, Norma Etta (1914). Morphology of Thismia americana ... University of Chicago.
- Pfeiffer, Norma E. (1914). "Undiscovered Plants". The Quarterly Journal. 5 (1). University of North Dakota.: 43–48.
- Pfeiffer, Norma Etta (1922). Monograph of the Isoetaceae. doi:10.5962/bhl.title.1629.
