= Thismia lanternata =

Fairy lantern

Conservation status
- Least Concern (NCA)

Scientific classification
- Kingdom: Plantae
- Clade: Tracheophytes
- Clade: Angiosperms
- Clade: Monocots
- Order: Dioscoreales
- Family: Burmanniaceae
- Genus: Thismia
- Species: T. lanternata

Binomial name
- Thismia lanternata W.E.Cooper

Species of flowering plant

Thismia lanternata, commonly known as fairy lantern, is a plant in the family Burmanniaceae found only in the Wet Tropics bioregion of Queensland, Australia.

== Description ==
Thismia lanternata is a small underground herb and an obligate myco-heterotroph, that is, it lacks chlorophyll and relies on a symbiotic association with fungi to obtain its nutrients. The roots, stem and leaves of the plant remain underground and only the flower appears above ground. The leaves are scale-like, pale, and measure up to 5 mm long by 3 mm wide. The flowers are solitary and are about 25 mm long by 12 mm wide. Only one fruit (immature) has been observed, which measured about 5 mm long and wide.

== Taxonomy ==
This species was first described (as Thismia lanternatus) by the Australian botanist Wendy Elizabeth Cooper, and published in the journal Austrobaileya in 2017. The species epithet lanternata is a reference to the lantern-like flower.

== Distribution and habitat ==
As of June 2024, it is only known from collections in disturbed rainforest near Chilverton, between Evelyn and Ravenshoe on the Atherton Tableland, Queensland.

== Conservation ==
Despite its extremely limited known range, Thismia lanternata is listed as least concern under the Queensland Government's Nature Conservation Act. As of 21 June 2024, it has not been assessed by the International Union for Conservation of Nature (IUCN).
