= International Journal of Plant Sciences =

- Discipline: Plant Sciences
- Language: English

Publication details
- Former name(s): Botanical Bulletin, Botanical Gazette
- History: 1875-present
- Publisher: University of Chicago Press (United States)
- Frequency: 9/year

Standard abbreviations
- ISO 4: Int. J. Plant Sci.

Indexing
- ISSN: 1058-5893
- LCCN: 00-227434
- JSTOR: 10585893
- OCLC no.: 24335365

Links
- Journal homepage

The International Journal of Plant Sciences covers botanical research including genetics and genomics, developmental and cell biology, biochemistry and physiology, morphology and structure, systematics, plant-microbe interactions, paleobotany, evolution, and ecology. The journal also regularly publishes important symposium proceedings. It is published by the University of Chicago Press. From 1875 to 1876 it was known as the Botanical Bulletin and from 1876 to 1991 as the Botanical Gazette. The first issue titled The International Journal of Plants Sciences was dated March 1992 (volume 53, number 1). For the years 1992 and 1993, the journal was published quarterly.

The journal was founded by brothers John Merle Coulter and Stanley Coulter. John brought the journal to the University of Chicago when he started the Department of Botany.
