= Charles Joseph Chamberlain =

American botanist (1863–1943)

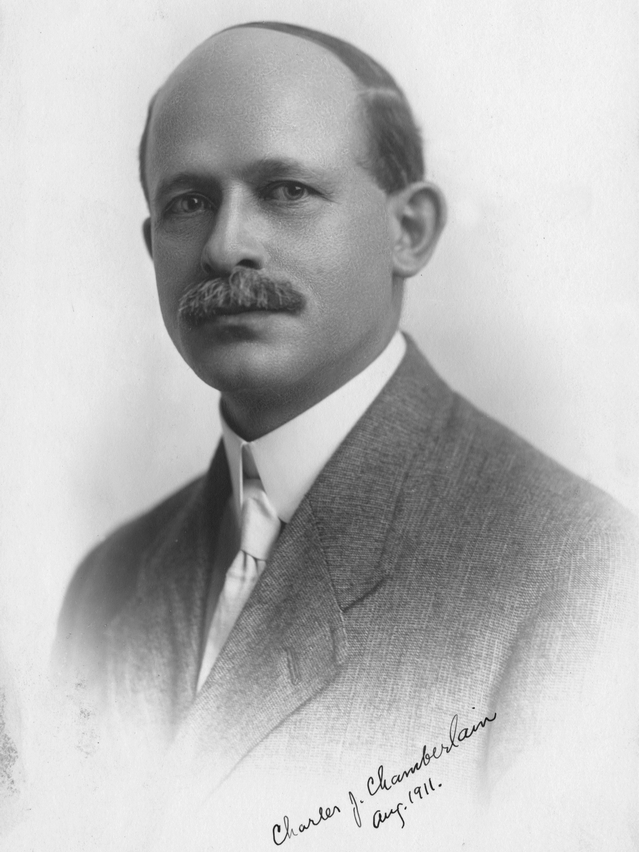
- Born: February 23, 1863; Sullivan, Ohio
- Died: February 5, 1943 (aged 79); Chicago, Illinois
- Scientific career
- Fields: Botany
- Author abbrev. (botany): Chamb.

Charles Joseph Chamberlain, Ph.D. (February 23, 1863 – February 5, 1943) was an American botanist, born near Sullivan, Ohio, and educated at Oberlin College and at the University of Chicago, where he earned the first Ph.D. in that institution's botany department, and where he was a long-time employee, becoming associate professor in 1911. He is known for pioneering the use of zoological techniques on the study of plants, particularly in the realm of microscopic studies of tissues and cells; his specialty was the cycad. He made contributions to the Botanical Gazette, and was the author of Methods in Plant Histology (1901) and The Morphology of Angiosperms (1903). In collaboration with John M. Coulter, he wrote The Morphology of Gymnosperms (1910).

Chamberlain married Mary E. Life in 1888 and they had one daughter; after his wife died in 1931, he married Martha Stanley Lathrop in 1938. He died in Chicago, Illinois.
