= Stanley Coulter =

American biologist (1853–1943)

Stanley Coulter (June 2, 1853 – June 26, 1943) was an American biologist, brother of botanist John Merle Coulter. He was born in Ningpo, China, to missionary parents Moses Stanley Coulter and Caroline Elvira (nee Crowe). He was educated at Hanover College. In 1887 he was appointed professor of biology at Purdue. His publications include more than 125 pamphlets on nature study, scientific researches, sketches, and also Flora of Indiana (1899), and A Key to the Genera of the Native Forest Trees and Shrubs of Indiana (1907). He was dean of the School of Sciences at Purdue from 1905 until his retirement in 1926. He married Lucy Eunice Post in 1877, and they had one daughter, Mabel Post (Coulter) Smith. Coulter's archives are held at Purdue University.
