= John Merle Coulter =

American botanist and educator (1851–1928)

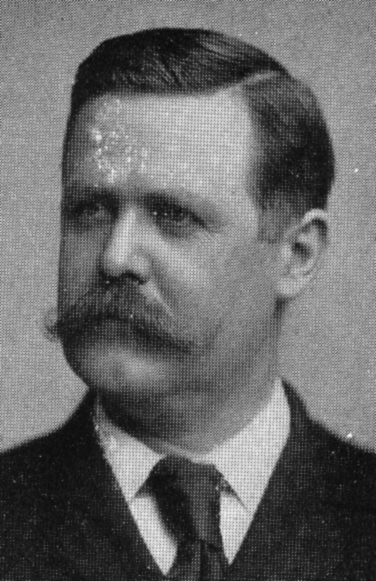

4th President of the Lake Forest College
- In office 1893–1896
- Preceded by: William C. Roberts
- Succeeded by: James Gore King McClure

8th President of Indiana University
- In office 1891–1893
- Preceded by: David Starr Jordan
- Succeeded by: Joseph Swain

Personal details
- Born: November 20, 1851 Ningbo, China
- Died: December 23, 1928 (aged 77) Yonkers, New York, US
- Resting place: Warsaw, Indiana, US
- Scientific career
- Education: Hanover College; Indiana University
- Fields: Botany
- Workplaces: Hanover College; U.S. Geological Survey; Wabash College; Indiana University; Lake Forest College; University of Chicago; Boyce Thompson Institute
- Doctoral students: Charles Joseph Chamberlain; Henry Chandler Cowles; Theodore C. Frye; Reginald Ruggles Gates; Lester W. Sharp; John Theodore Buchholz; Norma Etta Pfeiffer
- Author abbrev. (botany): J.M.Coult.

John Merle Coulter, Ph. D. (November 20, 1851 – December 23, 1928) was an American botanist and educator. In his career in education administration, Coulter is notable for serving as the president of Indiana University and Lake Forest College and the head of the Department of Botany at the University of Chicago.

== Early life and education ==
John Merle Coulter was born in Ningpo, China to missionary parents Caroline Elvira Crowe and Moses Stanley Coulter. His brother was the botanist Stanley Coulter. He graduated from Hanover College in Indiana receiving the degree A.B. in 1870, followed by an A.M. in 1873 and Ph.D. in 1883 from the Indiana University. Indiana University conferred a pro merito Ph.D. to Coulter in 1884 while he was serving as professor of botany at Wabash College. He married Georgie M. Gaylord of Delphi, Indiana, on January 1, 1874.

== Career ==
John Merle Coulter held the following positions:

- 1871–1879 Professor of Natural Sciences at Hanover College
- 1872–1875 Botanist to the United States Geological Survey in the Rocky Mountains
- 1879–1891 Professor of Botany at Wabash College
- 1891–1893 President and Professor of Botany of Indiana University, succeeding David Starr Jordan as president
- 1893–1896 President of Lake Forest University
- 1896–1925 Professor and head of the department of Botany at the University of Chicago.
- 1925–1928 Dean and adviser of the Boyce Thompson Institute for Plant Research in Yonkers, New York, a position he held until his death.

=== Memberships in scientific societies ===
Coulter was elected to the American Academy of Arts and Sciences in 1898. In 1901, Coulter was the general secretary of the American Association for the Advancement of Science and in 1918 served as the Association's president. From 1897 to 1898, he was the president of the Botanical Society of America. He was also an elected member of both the United States National Academy of Sciences and the American Philosophical Society.

=== Survival of the sinking of Republic ===
In 1909, Coulter and his wife, along with their children Grace and Merle, survived the sinking of the White Star liner Republic in which six were killed.

=== Later life ===
While employed at the Boyce Thompson Institute, Coulter died from heart disease at his home in Yonkers, New York, on December 23, 1928, at the age of 77.

== Notable works ==
John Merle Coulter's published works include:

- Synopsis of the Flora of Colorado (1874), with Thomas Porter and Ferdinand Vandeveer Hayden
- Manual of Rocky Mountain Botany (1885; revised, 1909)
- Manual of Texan Botany (1892–93)
- Plant Relations (1899; third revision, 1910)
- Plant Structures (1899; second edition, 1904)
- Morphology of Spermatophytes (1901)
- Morphology of Angiosperms (1903), with C. J. Chamberlain
- Plant Studies (1902; revised 1905)
- A Text-Book of Botany for Colleges and Universities(two volumes, 1910–11)
- Elementary Studies in Botany (1913)
- Plant Breeding (1914)
- Evolution, Heredity and Eugenics (1916)
- Religion and Science (1923)

In 1875, Coulter founded the Botanical Gazette and thereafter continued to be its editor.

== Legacy and contributions ==
=== As president of Indiana University ===
Coulter's student, Henry Chandler Cowles played a significant role in documenting the ecological importance of the Indiana Dunes. Many conservationists attempted to preserve parts of the Indiana Dunes.

Academic offices
Preceded by David Starr Jordan	President of Indiana University; 1891–1893	Succeeded by Joseph Swain
