= Spes (disambiguation) =

Spes is the Roman goddess of hope.

Spes may also refer to:

- Hope (virtue), spes in Latin

== Acronym ==
- Synergistic Processing Elements (SPEs), a type of accelerated processing unit in a Cell microprocessor
- Single particle extinction and scattering, a technique in physics used to characterise micro and nanoparticles
- South Place Ethical Society, former name of the Conway Hall Ethical Society
- Stanley Park Ecology Society
- Swedish Public Employment Service (Swedish: Arbetsförmedlingen), a Swedish government agency
- School of Philosophy and Economic Science, worldwide organisation based in London
- St. Paul's Episcopal School, in Mobile, Alabama

== Other uses ==
- Spes Bona, a suburb of Johannesburg, South Africa
- Spes Utia Island or Spesutie Island, in the Chesapeake Bay, Maryland, United States
- Temple of Spes, Ancient Rome

== See also ==
- Gaudium et spes, the Pastoral Constitution on the Church in the Modern World, was one of the principal documents of the Second Vatican Council
- SPE (disambiguation)
