= SPE =

SPE may refer to:

== Science and technology ==
- A monomer used to make polysulfobetaines, or occasionally the resulting polymer itself
- Serum protein electrophoresis
- Solar particle event, generating very high energy protons
- Solid phase extraction, from a mixture
- Solid-phase epitaxy, from amorphous to crystalline
- The Sound Pattern of English, a 1968 book by Noam Chomsky and Morris Halle
- SpE, abbreviation for Sporadic E propagation
- Spe (planet), 14 Andromedae b
- Stanford prison experiment, in psychology
- Synchronous payload envelope, in synchronous optical networking

=== Computer science ===
- Synergistic Processing Element in the Cell microprocessor
- Signal-Processing Engine, for example in the PowerPC e500
- Single-Pair Ethernet

== Organizations ==
- Sauber Petronas Engineering, car engine manufacturer
- Societas Privata Europaea, a Europe-wide type of limited company
- Sony Pictures Entertainment, a US company
- SPE, later Luminus (company)
- Special Police Establishment, later Central Bureau of Investigation, India
- Special purpose entity, for a specific purpose

=== Professional societies ===
- Society for Photographic Education
- Society of Petroleum Engineers
- Society of Plastics Engineers
- Society of Professional Engineers UK

== Other ==
- US supervisory patent examiner
- SPE Certified, a food standard
- Setiawangsa–Pantai Expressway, an expressway in Kuala Lumpur, Malaysia
- Société Parisienne d'Édition (S.P.É.), a French publisher
- Struga Poetry Evenings, an annual poetry festival in North Macedonia

== Gaming ==
- Seasonal Player Experience, a self imposed challenge in Realm of the Mad God

== See also ==
- Spes (disambiguation)
