= Temple of Spes =

'Temple of Spes or Temple of Hope refers to several ancient Roman temples primarily dedicated to Spes, a personification of Hope.

In particular, it may intend

- Temple of Spes (Carmental), the temple of Spes at the Forum Olitorium near the Carmental Gate in Rome
- Temple of Spes (Quirinal), the temple of Spes on the Quirinal Hill in Rome
