= Agriculture =

Cultivation of plants and animals to produce foods, fibers, fuels, and raw materials

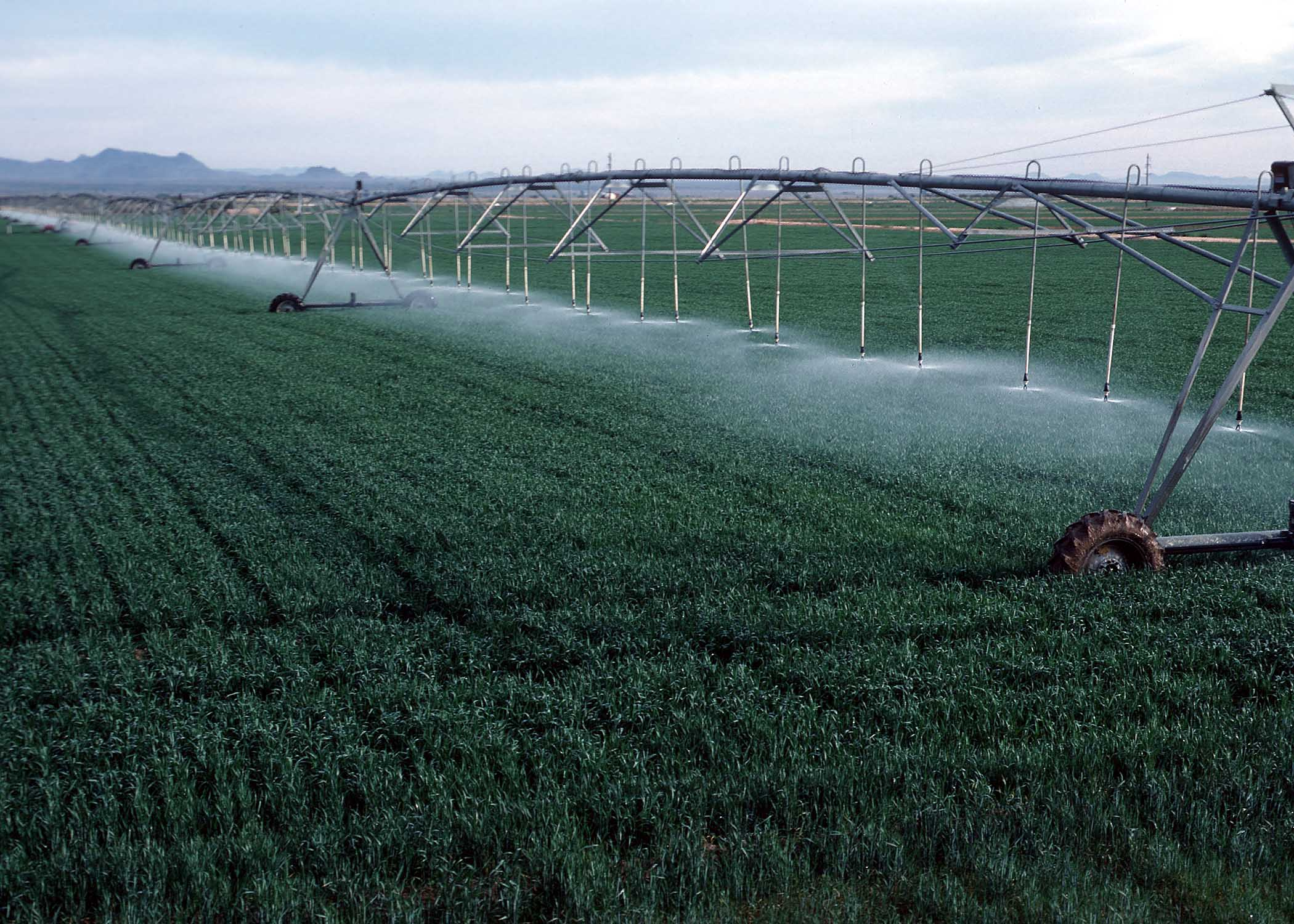
Modern agriculture: a center pivot irrigation system on a field

Agriculture is the practice of cultivating the soil, planting, raising, and harvesting both food and non-food crops, as well as livestock production. Broader definitions also include forestry and aquaculture. Agriculture was a key factor in the rise of sedentary human civilization, whereby farming of domesticated plants and animals created food surpluses that enabled people to live in the cities. While humans started gathering grains at least 105,000 years ago, nascent farmers only began planting them around 11,500 years ago. Sheep, goats, pigs, and cattle were domesticated around 10,000 years ago. Plants were independently cultivated in at least 11 regions of the world. In the 20th century, industrial agriculture based on large-scale monocultures came to dominate agricultural output.

As of 2021, small farms, of which the vast majority are one hectare (about 2.5 acres) or smaller, produce about one-third of the world's food. Moreover, five of every six farms in the world consist of fewer than 2 hectares (4.9 acres) and take up only around 12% of all agricultural land. In terms of total land use, large farms are dominant. While only 1% of all farms globally are greater than 50 hectares (120 acres), they encompass more than 70% of the world's farmland. Further, nearly 40% of all global agricultural land is found on farms larger than 1,000 hectares (2,500 acres).

Farms and farming greatly influence rural economics and greatly shape rural society, affecting both the direct agricultural workforce and broader businesses that support the farms and farming populations.

The major agricultural products can be broadly grouped into foods, fibers, fuels, and raw materials (such as rubber and timber). Food classes include cereals (grains), vegetables, fruits, cooking oils, meat, milk, eggs, and fungi. Global agricultural production amounts to approximately 11 billion tonnes of food, 32 million tonnes of natural fibers and 4 billion m^{3} of wood. However, around 14% of the world's food is lost from production before reaching the retail level.

Modern agronomy, plant breeding, agrochemicals such as pesticides and fertilizers, and technological developments have sharply increased crop yields, but also contributed to ecological and environmental damage. Selective breeding and modern practices in animal husbandry have similarly increased the output of meat, but have raised concerns about animal welfare and environmental damage. Environmental issues include contributions to climate change, depletion of aquifers, deforestation, antibiotic resistance, and other agricultural pollution. Agriculture is both a cause of and sensitive to environmental degradation, such as biodiversity loss, desertification, soil degradation, and climate change, all of which can cause decreases in crop yield. Genetically modified organisms are widely used, although some countries ban them.

== Etymology and scope ==
The word agriculture is a late Middle English adaptation of Latin agricultūra, from ager 'field' and cultūra 'cultivation' or 'growing'. Agriculture is defined with varying scopes, in its broadest sense using natural resources to "produce commodities which maintain life, including food, fiber, forest products, horticultural crops, and their related services". Thus defined, it includes arable farming, horticulture, animal husbandry and forestry, but horticulture and forestry are in practice often excluded. It may also be broadly decomposed into plant agriculture, which concerns the cultivation of useful plants, and animal agriculture, the production of agricultural animals.

While agriculture usually refers to human activities, other species have been cultivating crops for up to 60 million years, such as some ant (see agriculture in ants), termite and beetle.

== History ==
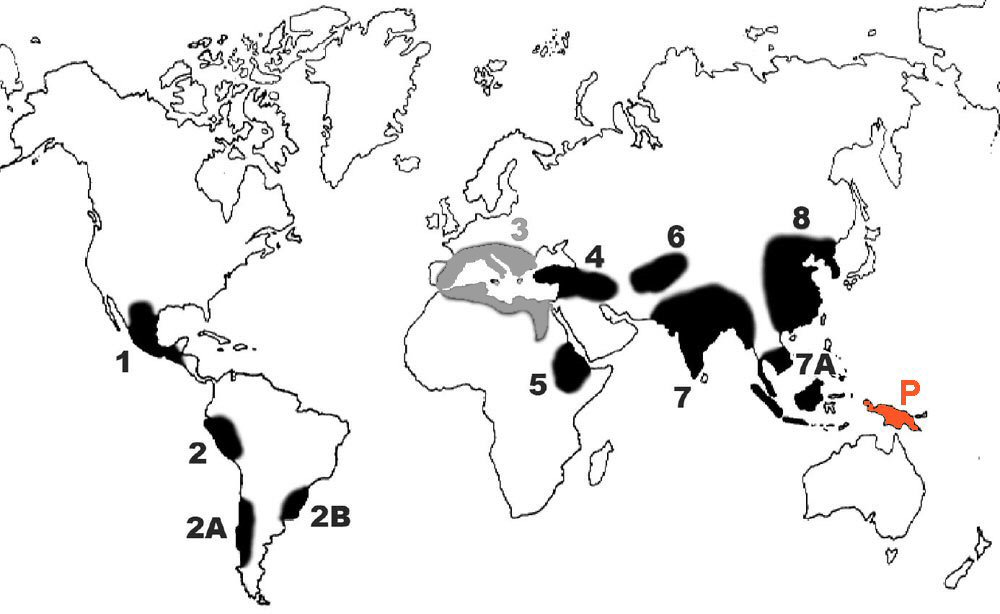
Centres of origin, as numbered by Nikolai Vavilov in the 1930s Area 3 is no longer recognized as a center of origin. New Guinea (area P) was identified more recently.

=== Origins ===
The development of agriculture enabled the human population to grow many times larger than could be sustained by hunting and gathering. Agriculture began independently in different parts of the globe, and included a diverse range of taxa, in at least 11 separate centers of origin. Wild grains were collected and eaten from at least 105,000 years ago. In the Paleolithic Levant, 23,000 years ago, cereals cultivation of emmer, barley, and oats has been observed near the sea of Galilee. Rice was domesticated in China between 11,500 and 6200 BC with the earliest known cultivation from 5700 BC, followed by mung, soy and azuki beans. Sheep were domesticated in Mesopotamia between 13,000 and 11,000 years ago. Cattle were domesticated from the wild aurochs in the areas of modern Turkey and Pakistan some 10,500 years ago. Pig production emerged in Eurasia, including Europe, East Asia and Southwest Asia, where wild boar were first domesticated about 10,500 years ago. In the Andes of South America, the potato was domesticated between 10,000 and 7,000 years ago, along with beans, coca, llamas, alpacas, and guinea pigs. Sugarcane and some root vegetables were domesticated in New Guinea around 9,000 years ago. Sorghum was domesticated in the Sahel region of Africa by 7,000 years ago. Cotton was domesticated in Peru by 5,600 years ago, and was independently domesticated in Eurasia. In Mesoamerica, wild teosinte was bred into maize (corn) from 10,000 to 6,000 years ago. The horse was domesticated in the Eurasian Steppes around 3500 BC. Scholars have offered multiple hypotheses to explain the historical origins of agriculture. Studies of the transition from hunter-gatherer to agricultural societies indicate an initial period of intensification and increasing sedentism; examples are the Natufian culture in the Levant, and the Early Chinese Neolithic in China. Then, wild stands that had previously been harvested started to be planted, and gradually came to be domesticated.

=== Civilizations ===
Map of the world showing approximate centers of origin of agriculture and its spread in prehistory. DNA studies have shown that agriculture was introduced in Europe by the expansion of the early farmers from Anatolia about 9,000 years ago.

In the Middle East, the Sumerians started to live in villages from about 8000 BC, relying on the Tigris and Euphrates rivers and a canal system for irrigation. Ploughs appear in pictographs around 3000 BC; seed-ploughs around 2300 BC. Farmers grew wheat, barley, vegetables such as lentils and onions, and fruits including dates, grapes, and figs. Ancient Egyptian agriculture relied on the Nile River and its seasonal flooding. Farming started in the predynastic period at the end of the Paleolithic, after 10,000 BC. Staple food crops were grains such as wheat and barley, alongside industrial crops such as flax and papyrus.

In India, wheat, barley and jujube were domesticated by 9000 BC, soon followed by sheep and goats. Cattle, sheep and goats were domesticated in Mehrgarh culture by 8000–6000 BC. Cotton was cultivated by the 5th–4th millennium BC. Archeological evidence indicates an animal-drawn plough from 2500 BC in the Indus Valley civilization.

In China, from the 5th century BC, there was a nationwide granary system and widespread silk farming. Water-powered grain mills were in use by the 1st century BC, followed by irrigation. By the late 2nd century, heavy ploughs had been developed with iron ploughshares and mouldboards. These spread westwards across Eurasia. Asian rice was domesticated 8,200–13,500 years ago – depending on the molecular clock estimate that is used– on the Pearl River in southern China with a single genetic origin from the wild rice Oryza rufipogon.

In Greece and Rome, the major cereals were wheat, emmer, and barley, alongside vegetables including peas, beans, and olives. Sheep and goats were kept mainly for dairy products.

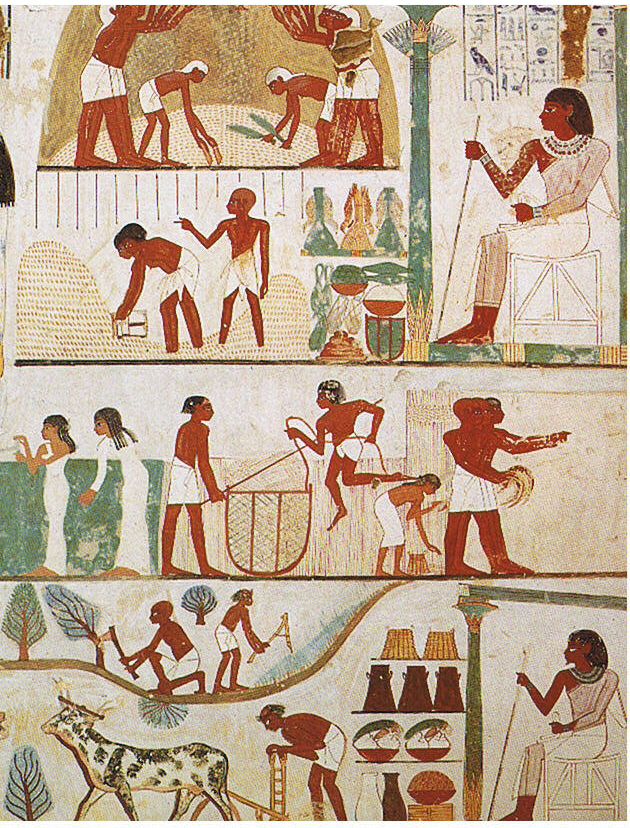
Agricultural scenes of threshing, a grain store, harvesting with sickles, digging, tree-cutting and ploughing from ancient Egypt. Tomb of Nakht, 15th century BC

In the Americas, crops domesticated in Mesoamerica (apart from teosinte) include squash, beans, and cacao. Cocoa was domesticated by the Mayo Chinchipe of the upper Amazon around 3000 BC. The turkey was probably domesticated in Mexico or the American Southwest. The Aztecs developed irrigation systems, formed terraced hillsides, fertilized their soil, and developed chinampas or artificial islands. The Mayas used extensive canal and raised field systems to farm swampland from 400 BC. In South America agriculture may have begun about 9000 BC with the domestication of squash (Cucurbita) and other plants. Coca was domesticated in the Andes, as were the peanut, tomato, tobacco, and pineapple. Cotton was domesticated in Peru by 3600 BC. Animals including llamas, alpacas, and guinea pigs were domesticated there. In North America, the indigenous people of the East domesticated crops such as sunflower, tobacco, squash and Chenopodium. Wild foods including wild rice and maple sugar were harvested. The domesticated strawberry is a hybrid of a Chilean and a North American species, developed by breeding in Europe and North America. The indigenous people of the Southwest and the Pacific Northwest practiced forest gardening and fire-stick farming. The natives controlled fire on a regional scale to create a low-intensity fire ecology that sustained a low-density agriculture in loose rotation; a sort of "wild" permaculture. A system of companion planting called the Three Sisters was developed in North America. The three crops were winter squash, maize, and climbing beans.

Indigenous Australians, long supposed to have been nomadic hunter-gatherers, practiced systematic burning, possibly to enhance natural productivity in fire-stick farming. Scholars have pointed out that hunter-gatherers need a productive environment to support gathering without cultivation. Because the forests of New Guinea have few food plants, early humans may have used "selective burning" to increase the productivity of the wild karuka fruit trees to support the hunter-gatherer way of life.

The Gunditjmara and other groups developed eel farming and fish trapping systems from some 5,000 years ago. There is evidence of 'intensification' across the whole continent over that period. In two regions of Australia, the central west coast and eastern central, early farmers cultivated yams, native millet, and bush onions, possibly in permanent settlements.

=== Revolution ===
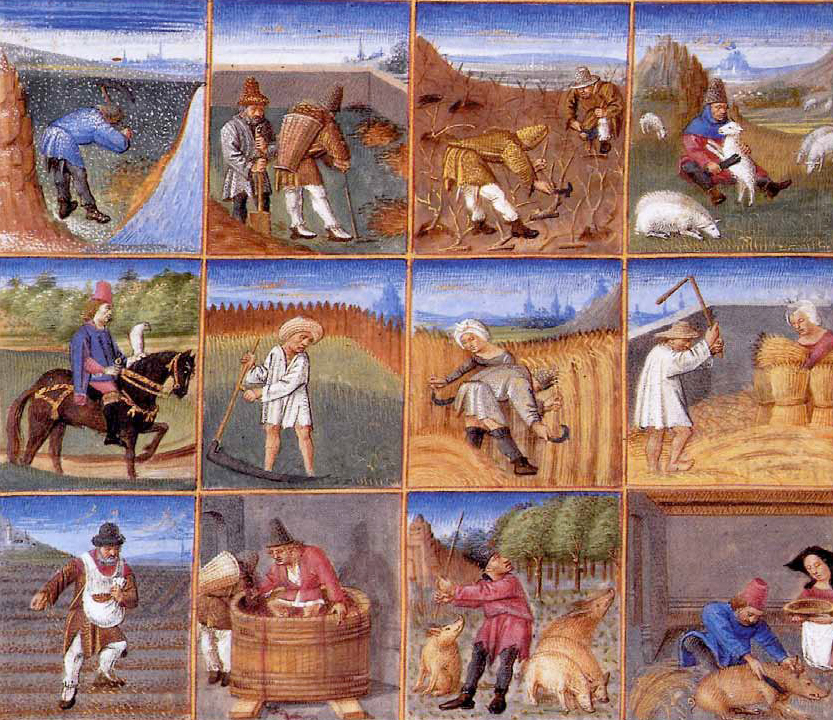
Agricultural calendar, c. 1470, from a manuscript of Pietro de Crescenzi

In the Middle Ages, compared to the Roman period, agriculture in Western Europe became more focused on self-sufficiency. The agricultural population under feudalism was typically organized into manors consisting of several hundred or more acres of land presided over by a lord of the manor with a Roman Catholic church and priest.

Thanks to the exchange with the Al-Andalus where the Arab Agricultural Revolution was underway, European agriculture transformed, with improved techniques and the diffusion of crop plants, including the introduction of sugar, rice, cotton and fruit trees (such as the orange).

After 1492, the Columbian exchange brought New World crops such as maize, potatoes, tomatoes, sweet potatoes, and manioc to Europe, and Old World crops such as wheat, barley, rice, and turnips, and livestock (including horses, cattle, sheep and goats) to the Americas.

Irrigation, crop rotation, and fertilizers advanced from the 17th century with the British Agricultural Revolution, allowing global population to rise significantly. Since 1900, agriculture in developed nations, and to a lesser extent in the developing world, has seen large rises in productivity as mechanization replaces human labor, and assisted by synthetic fertilizers, pesticides, and selective breeding. The Haber-Bosch method allowed the synthesis of ammonium nitrate fertilizer on an industrial scale, greatly increasing crop yields and sustaining a further increase in global population.

== Types ==
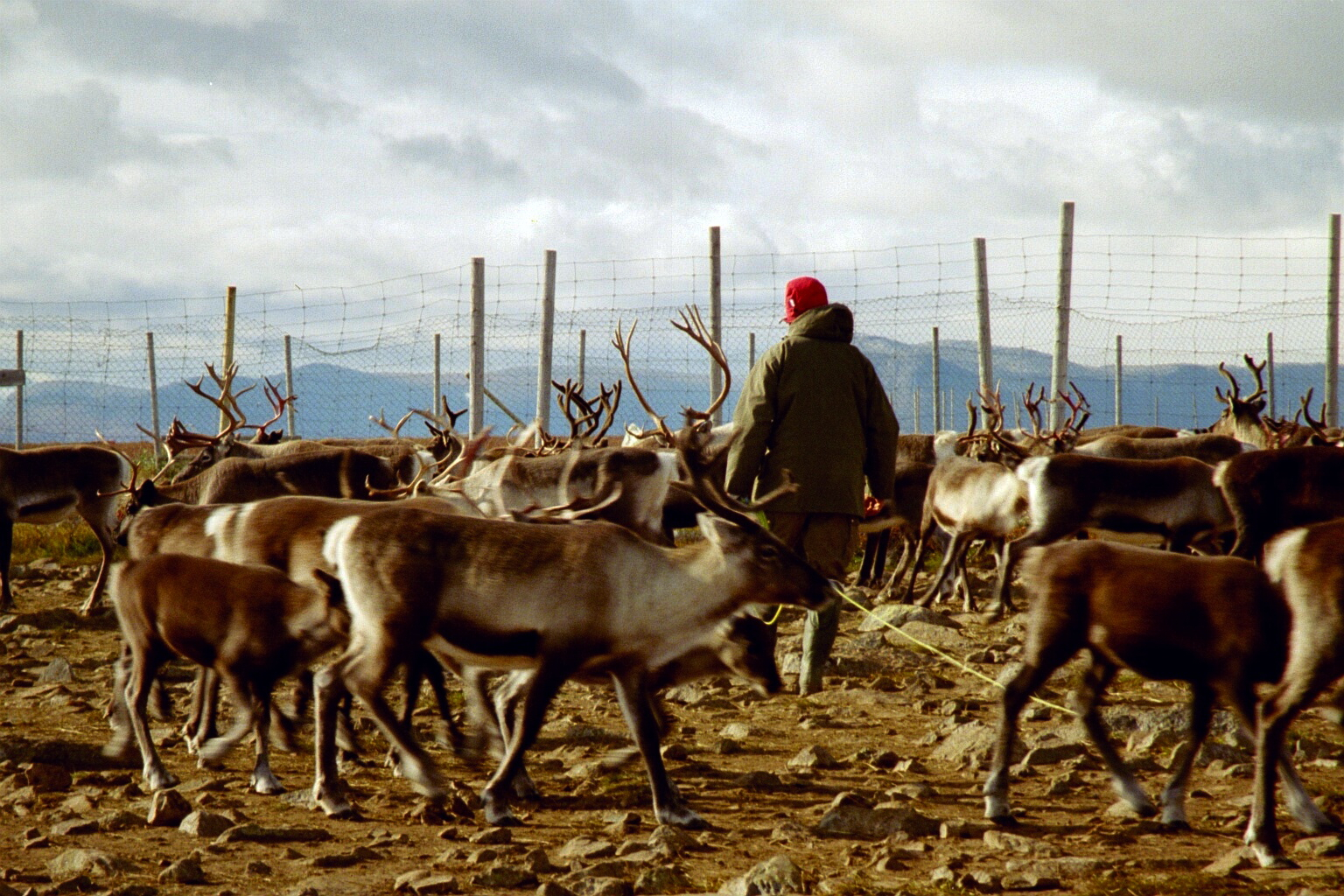
Reindeer herds form the basis of pastoral agriculture for several Arctic and Subarctic peoples.

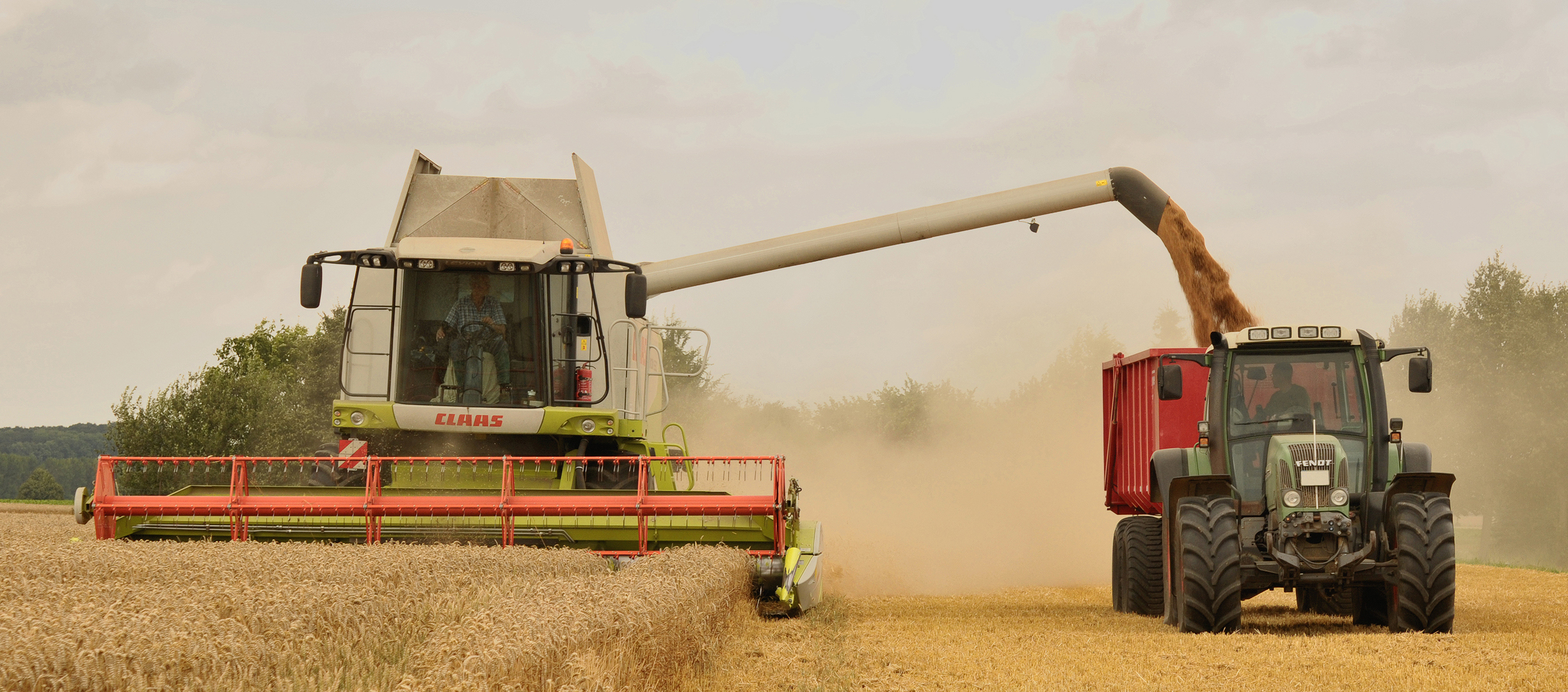
Harvesting wheat with a combine harvester accompanied by a tractor and trailer

Pastoralism involves managing domesticated animals. In nomadic pastoralism, herds of livestock are moved from place to place in search of pasture, fodder, and water. This type of farming is practiced in arid and semi-arid regions of Sahara, Central Asia and some parts of India.

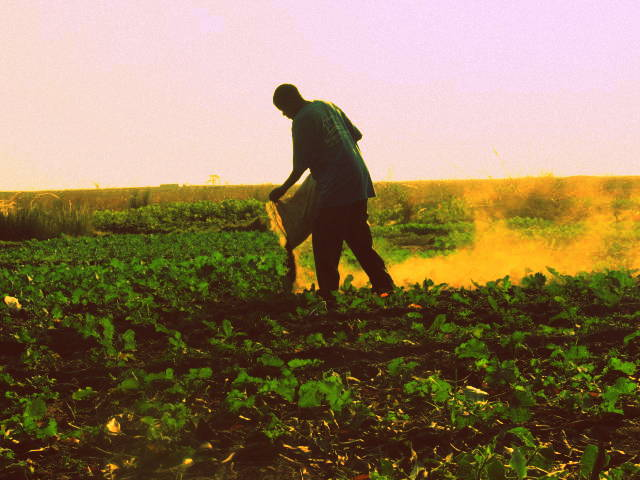
Spreading manure by hand in Zambia

In shifting cultivation, a small area of forest is cleared by cutting and burning the trees. The cleared land is used for growing crops for a few years until the soil becomes too infertile, and the area is abandoned. Another patch of land is selected and the process is repeated. This type of farming is practiced mainly in areas with abundant rainfall where the forest regenerates quickly. This practice is used in Northeast India, Southeast Asia, and the Amazon Basin.

Subsistence farming is practiced to satisfy family or local needs alone, with little left over for transport elsewhere. It is intensively practiced in Monsoon Asia and South-East Asia. An estimated 2.5 billion subsistence farmers worked in 2018, cultivating about 60% of the earth's arable land.

Intensive farming is cultivation to maximize productivity, with a low fallow ratio and a high use of inputs (water, fertilizer, pesticide and automation). It is practiced mainly in developed countries.

== Contemporary agriculture ==
Share of GDP from agriculture

=== Status ===
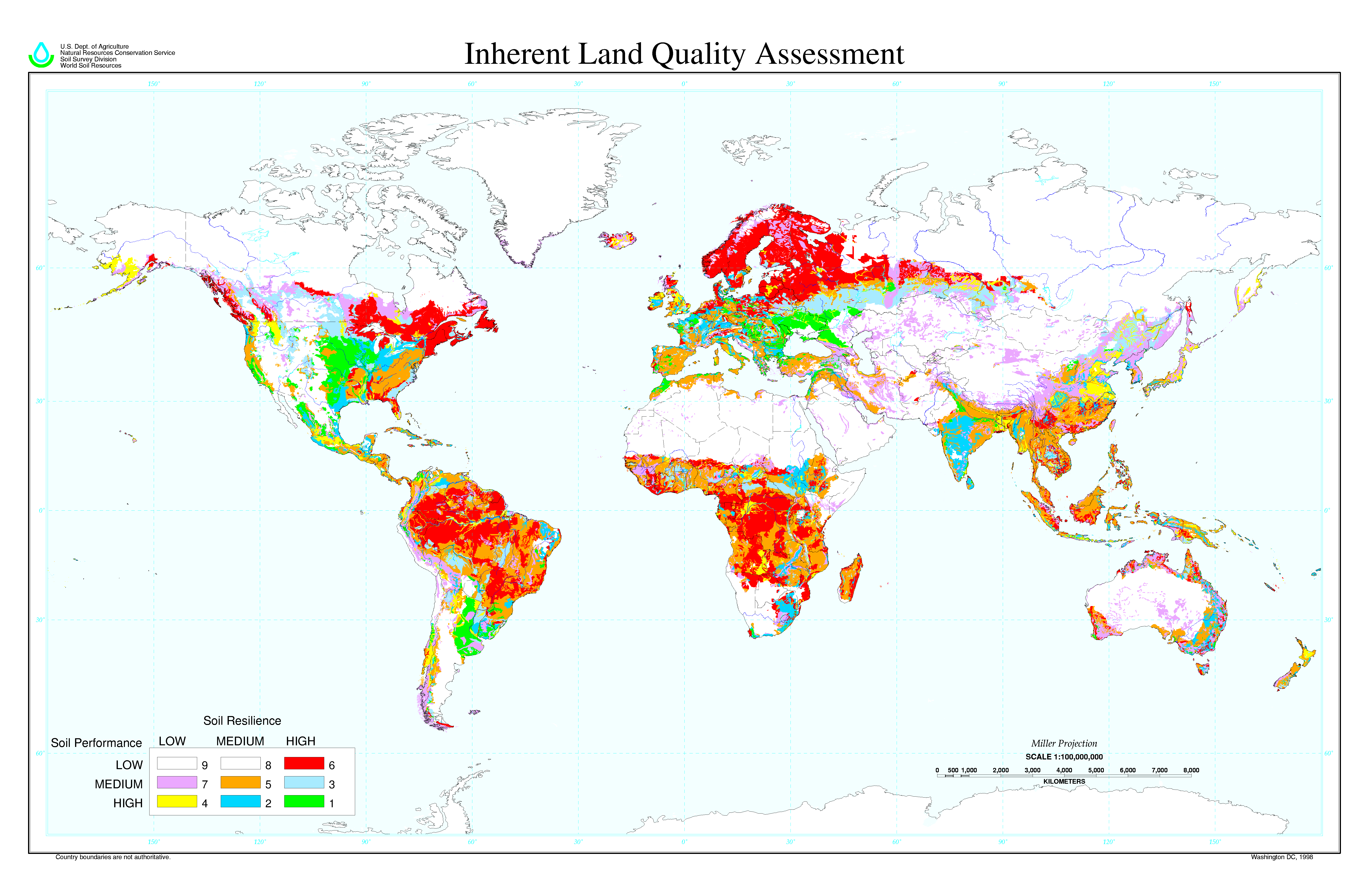
Suitability for agriculture of land around the world (US Department of Agriculture, 1998)

Recent trends of employment in agriculture (including forestry and fishing) by region

From the twentieth century onwards, intensive agriculture increased crop productivity. It substituted synthetic fertilizers and pesticides for labor, but caused increased water pollution, and often involved farm subsidies. Soil degradation and diseases such as stem rust are major concerns globally; approximately 40% of the world's agricultural land is seriously degraded. Modern agriculture has raised or encountered ecological, political, and economic issues including water pollution, biofuels, genetically modified organisms, tariffs and farm subsidies, leading to alternative approaches such as the organic movement. Unsustainable farming practices in North America led to the Dust Bowl of the 1930s. In recent years there has been a backlash against the environmental effects of conventional agriculture, resulting in the organic, regenerative, and sustainable agriculture movements. One of the major forces behind this movement has been the European Union, which first certified organic food in 1991 and began reform of its Common Agricultural Policy (CAP) in 2005 to phase out commodity-linked farm subsidies, also known as decoupling. The growth of organic farming has renewed research in alternative technologies such as integrated pest management, selective breeding, and controlled-environment agriculture. There are concerns about the lower yield associated with organic farming and its impact on global food security. Recent mainstream technological developments include genetically modified food.

During the 60-year period between 1964 and 2023, most of the increase in agricultural production was achieved through intensification, while the expansion of agricultural land was limited to just 8%.

In the twenty-first century, between 2001 and 2023, global agricultural area decreased by 78 million hectares (Mha) (−2%), with cropland area increasing by 78 Mha and permanent meadows and pastures decreasing by 151 Mha. These changes exhibit significant regional variations. Sub-Saharan Africa witnessed cropland expansion of 69 Mha accompanied by 72 Mha of forest loss, while Latin America saw 25 Mha of cropland growth alongside 85 Mha of net forest area loss. Agricultural expansion remains the primary driver of global deforestation, accounting for nearly 90% of forest loss. In this century, another important aspect to consider is that approximately 3.6 Mha of croplands are abandoned annually, with land degradation likely playing a significant role in these losses.

Development of agricultural output of China in 2015 US$ since 1961

By 2015, the agricultural output of China was the largest in the world, followed by the European Union, India and the United States. Economists measure the total factor productivity of agriculture, according to which agriculture in the United States is roughly 1.7 times more productive than it was in 1948. Long-term productivity gains are greatest when agricultural research and development is oriented towards fruits, vegetables and legumes.

Agriculture employed 873 million people in 2021, or 27% of the global workforce, 916 million in 2023, compared with 1 027 million (or 40%) in 2000. The share of agriculture in global GDP was stable at around 4% since 2000–2023.

Despite increases in agricultural production and productivity, between 702 and 828 million people were affected by hunger in 2021. Food insecurity and malnutrition can be the result of conflict, climate extremes and variability and economic swings. It can also be caused by a country's structural characteristics such as income status and natural resource endowments as well as its political economy.

Pesticide use in agriculture went up 62% between 2000 and 2021, with the Americas accounting for half the use in 2021.

The International Fund for Agricultural Development posits that an increase in smallholder agriculture may be part of the solution to concerns about food prices and overall food security, given the favorable experience of Vietnam.

Disasters have inflicted an estimated US$3.26 trillion in agricultural losses over 33 years (1991–2023), averaging at US$99 billion per year, with cereal crops bearing the heaviest burden at 4.6 billion tonnes lost, followed by fruits and vegetables (2.8 billion tonnes), and with meat and dairy losing 900 million tonnes.

=== Workforce ===
Worldwide employment in agriculture, forestry and fishing in 2023

Agriculture provides about one-quarter of all global employment, more than half in sub-Saharan Africa and almost 60 percent in low-income countries. As countries develop, other jobs have historically pulled workers away from agriculture, and labor-saving innovations increase agricultural productivity by reducing labor requirements per unit of output. Over time, a combination of labor supply and labor demand trends have driven down the share of population employed in agriculture.

On the three-sector theory, the proportion of people working in agriculture (left-hard bar in each group, green) falls as an economy becomes more developed.

During the 16th century in Europe, between 55 and 75% of the population was engaged in agriculture; by the 19th century, this had dropped to between 35 and 65%. In the same countries today, the figure is less than 10%. At the start of the 21st century, some one billion people, or over 1/3 of the available work force, were employed in agriculture. This constitutes approximately 70% of the global employment of children, and in many countries constitutes the largest percentage of women of any industry. The service sector overtook the agricultural sector as the largest global employer in 2007.

In many developed countries, immigrants help fill labor shortages in high-value agriculture activities that are difficult to mechanize. Foreign farm workers from mostly Eastern Europe, North Africa and South Asia constituted around one-third of the salaried agricultural workforce in Spain, Italy, Greece and Portugal in 2013. In the United States of America, more than half of all hired farmworkers (roughly 450,000 workers) were immigrants in 2019, although the number of new immigrants arriving in the country to work in agriculture has fallen by 75 percent in recent years and rising wages indicate this has led to a major labor shortage on US farms.

==== Women in agriculture ====
Around the world, women make up a large share of the population employed in agriculture. This share is growing in all developing regions except East and Southeast Asia where women already make up about 50 percent of the agricultural workforce. Women make up 47 percent of the agricultural workforce in sub-Saharan Africa, a rate that has not changed significantly in the past few decades. However, the Food and Agriculture Organization of the United Nations (FAO) posits that the roles and responsibilities of women in agriculture may be changing – for example, from subsistence farming to wage employment, and from contributing household members to primary producers in the context of male-out-migration.

In general, women account for a greater share of agricultural employment at lower levels of economic development, as inadequate education, limited access to basic infrastructure and markets, high unpaid work burden and poor rural employment opportunities outside agriculture severely limit women's opportunities for off-farm work.

Women who work in agricultural production tend to do so under highly unfavorable conditions. They tend to be concentrated in the poorest countries, where alternative livelihoods are not available, and they maintain the intensity of their work in conditions of climate-induced weather shocks and in situations of conflict. Women are less likely to participate as entrepreneurs and independent farmers and are engaged in the production of less lucrative crops.

The gender gap in land productivity between female- and male managed farms of the same size is 24 percent. On average, women earn 18.4 percent less than men in wage employment in agriculture; this means that women receive 82 cents for every dollar earned by men. Progress has been slow in closing gaps in women's access to irrigation and in ownership of livestock, too.

Women in agriculture still have significantly less access than men to inputs, including improved seeds, fertilizers and mechanized equipment. On a positive note, the gender gap in access to mobile internet in low- and middle-income countries fell from 25 percent to 16 percent between 2017 and 2021, and the gender gap in access to bank accounts narrowed from 9 to 6 percentage points. Women are as likely as men to adopt new technologies when the necessary enabling factors are put in place and they have equal access to complementary resources.

=== Safety ===
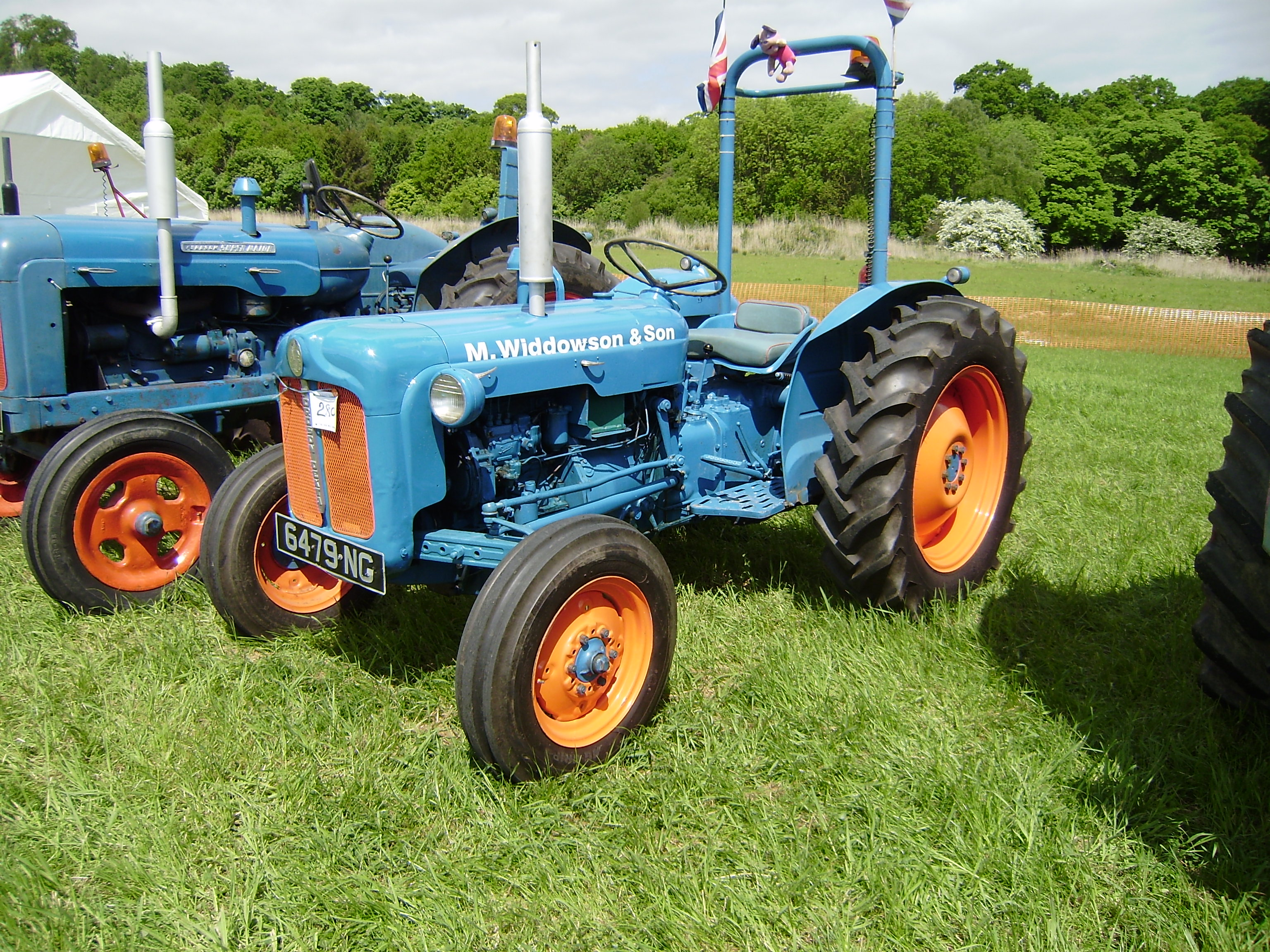
Rollover protection bar retrofitted to a mid-20th century Fordson tractor

Agriculture, specifically farming, remains a hazardous industry, and farmers worldwide remain at high risk of work-related injuries, lung disease, noise-induced hearing loss, skin diseases, as well as certain cancers related to chemical use and prolonged sun exposure. On industrialized farms, injuries frequently involve the use of agricultural machinery, and a common cause of fatal agricultural injuries in developed countries is tractor rollovers. Pesticides and other chemicals used in farming can be hazardous to worker health, and workers exposed to pesticides may experience illness or have children with birth defects. As an industry in which families commonly share in work and live on the farm itself, entire families can be at risk for injuries, illness, and death. Ages 0–6 may be an especially vulnerable population in agriculture; common causes of fatal injuries among young farm workers include drowning, machinery and motor accidents, including with all-terrain vehicles. Occupational fatality data from the last decade indicate that, when looking at all industries, agriculture had the leading number of work-related deaths for youth. Within this industry, youth between the ages of 10 and 15 suffered the most non-fatal work-related injuries. While farming is hazardous, studies have looked at the fact that there are also many benefits to growing up and living on a farm.

The International Labor Organization considers agriculture "one of the most hazardous of all economic sectors". It estimates that the annual work-related death toll among agricultural employees is at least 170,000, twice the average rate of other jobs. In addition, incidences of death, injury and illness related to agricultural activities often go unreported. The organization has developed the Safety and Health in Agriculture Convention, 2001, which covers the range of risks in the agriculture occupation, the prevention of these risks and the role that individuals and organizations engaged in agriculture should play.

In the United States, agriculture has been identified by the National Institute for Occupational Safety and Health as a priority industry sector in the National Occupational Research Agenda to identify and provide intervention strategies for occupational health and safety issues. In the European Union, the European Agency for Safety and Health at Work has issued guidelines on implementing health and safety directives in agriculture, livestock farming, horticulture, and forestry. The Agricultural Safety and Health Council of America (ASHCA) also holds a yearly summit to discuss safety.

=== Environmental impact ===
Extending over 4.8 billion ha in 2025 – the equivalent of one-third of the Earth's land surface – agriculture has a greater impact on land and water resources compared with any other economic sector. Pressure on land, soil and water resources has seriously compromised the performance and future prospects of agriculture, resulting in further loss of productive land and reduced water availability for farming and other forms of agricultural production. Agricultural expansion drives deforestation and is one of the primary causes of the degradation of carbon-rich ecosystems such as peatlands. An estimated 64% of agricultural land is at risk of pesticide pollution, which damages biodiversity by destroying pollinators, harms soil microbiota and makes agrifood systems less resilient to pests, pathogens and climate change. Accounting for 72% of global freshwater withdrawals, a figure predicted to rise further in the future, agriculture contributes to and is increasingly affected by water scarcity. Overexploitation of groundwater and seawater intrusion in coastal aquifers is widespread, with major implications for food security.

== Production ==
Value of agricultural production

Overall production varies by country as listed.

Largest countries by agricultural output (in nominal terms) according to IMF and CIA World Factbook, at peak level as of 2018

Economy	Countries by agricultural output (in nominal terms) at peak level as of 2018 (billions in USD
(01) China	1,117
(02) India	414
(—) European Union	308
(03) United States	185
(04) Brazil	162
(05) Indonesia	141
(06) Nigeria	123
(07) Russia	108
(08) Pakistan	76
(09) Argentina	70
(10) Turkey	64
(11) Japan	62
(12) France	59
(13) Iran	57
(14) Australia	56
(15) Mexico	51
(16) Italy	50
(17) Spain	43
(18) Bangladesh	41
(19) Thailand	40
(20) Egypt	40
The twenty largest countries by agricultural output (in nominal terms) at peak level as of 2018, according to the IMF and CIA World Factbook.

Largest countries by agricultural output according to UNCTAD at 2005 constant prices and exchange rates, 2015

Economy	Countries by agricultural output in 2015 (millions in 2005 constant USD and exchange rates)
(01) China	418,455
(02) India	196,592
(03) United States	149,023
(04) Nigeria	77,113
(05) Brazil	59,977

=== Cropping systems ===
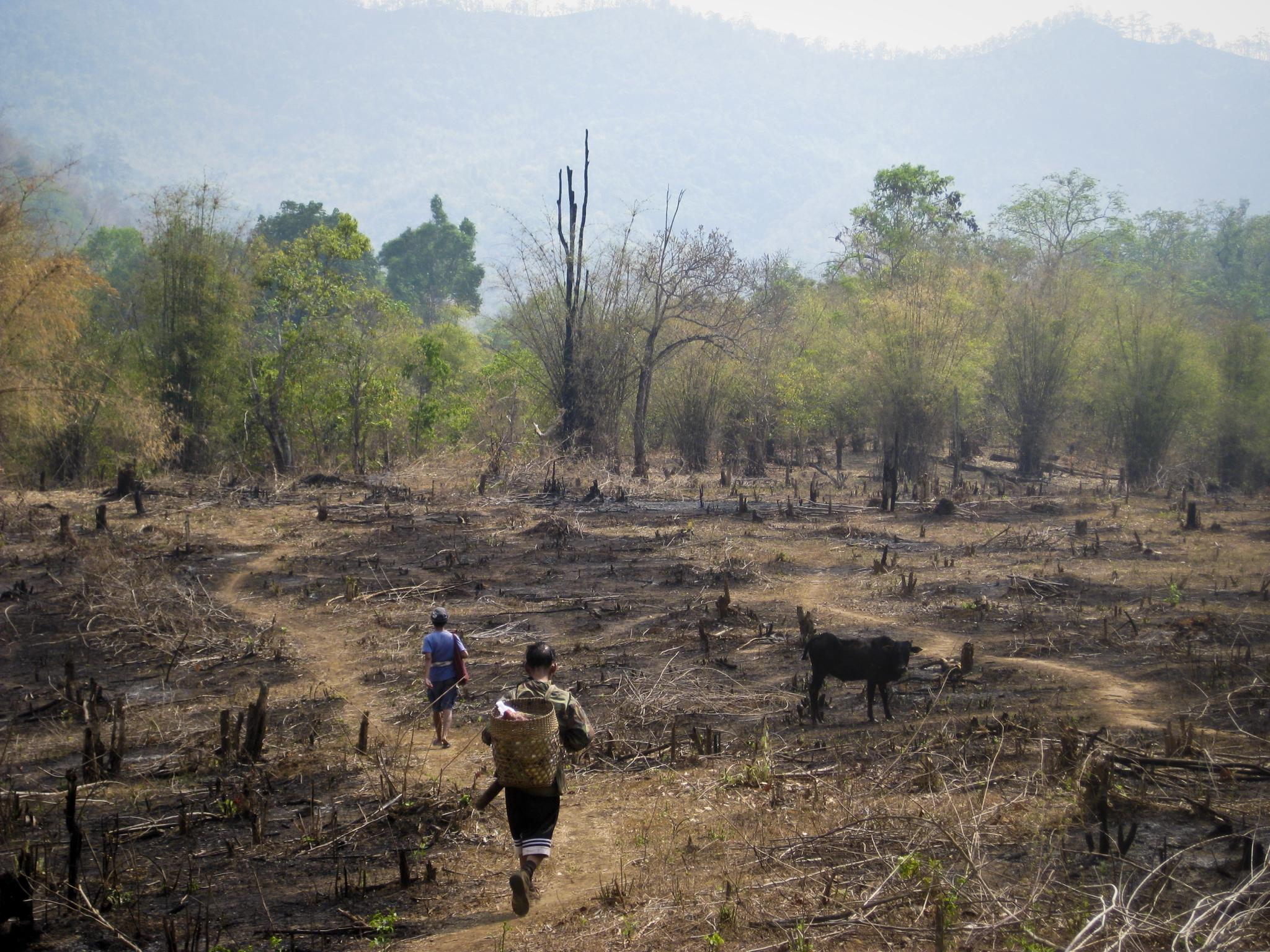
Slash and burn shifting cultivation, Thailand

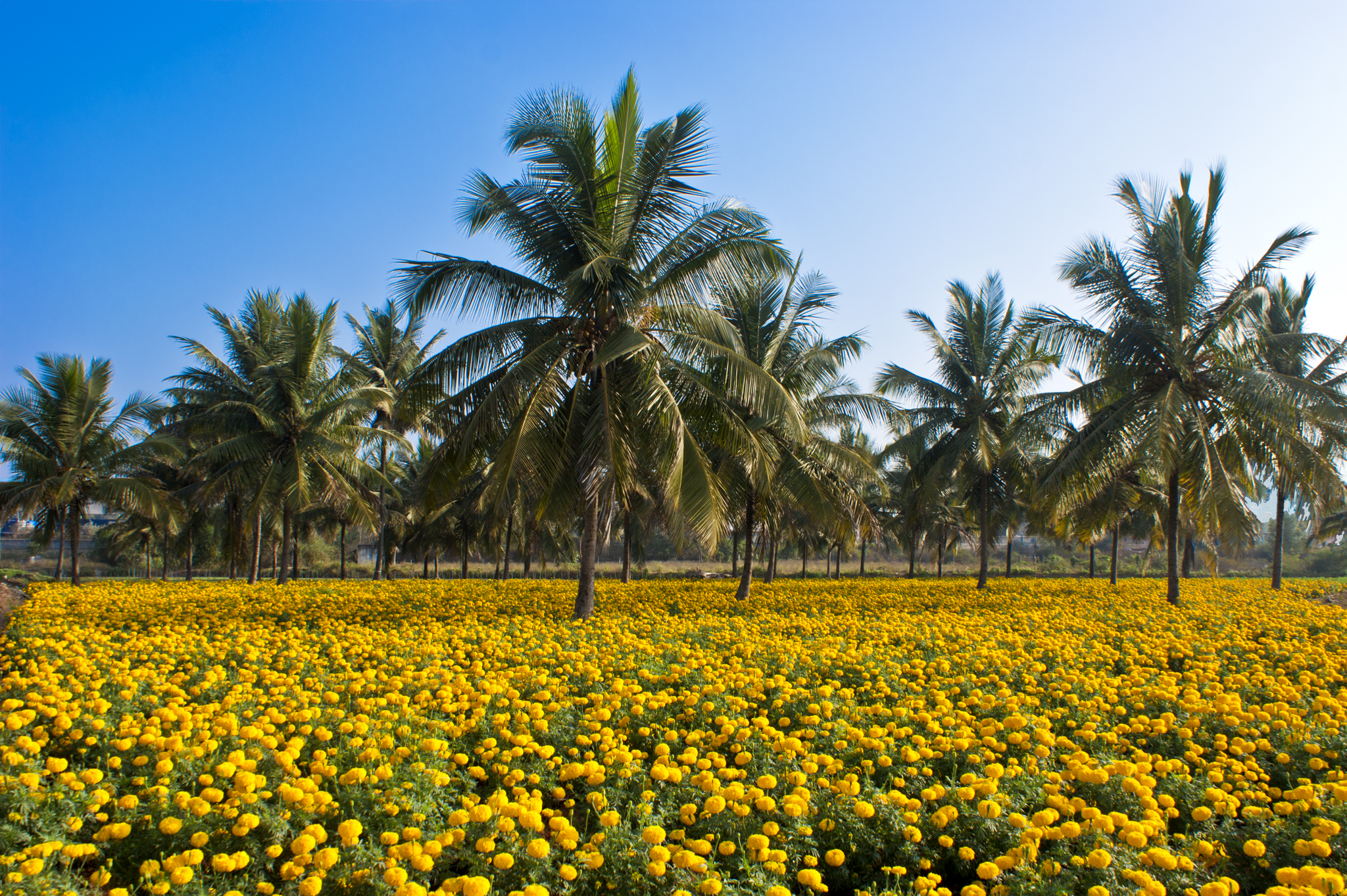
Intercropping of coconut and Mexican marigold

Cropping systems vary among farms depending on the available resources and constraints; geography and climate of the farm; government policy; economic, social and political pressures; and the philosophy and culture of the farmer.

Shifting cultivation (or slash and burn) is a system in which forests are burnt, releasing nutrients to support cultivation of annual and then perennial crops for a period of several years. Then the plot is left fallow to regrow forest, and the farmer moves to a new plot, returning after many more years (10–20). This fallow period is shortened if population density grows, requiring the input of nutrients (fertilizer or manure) and some manual pest control. Annual cultivation is the next phase of intensity in which there is no fallow period. This requires even greater nutrient and pest control inputs.

Further industrialization led to the use of monocultures, when one cultivar is planted on a large acreage. Because of the low biodiversity, nutrient use is uniform and pests tend to build up, necessitating the greater use of pesticides and fertilizers. Multiple cropping, in which several crops are grown sequentially in one year, and intercropping, when several crops are grown at the same time, are other kinds of annual cropping systems known as polycultures.

In subtropical and arid environments, the timing and extent of agriculture may be limited by rainfall, either not allowing multiple annual crops in a year, or requiring irrigation. In all of these environments perennial crops are grown (coffee, chocolate) and systems are practiced such as agroforestry. In temperate environments, where ecosystems were predominantly grassland or prairie, highly productive annual farming is the dominant agricultural system.

Important categories of food crops include cereals, legumes, forage, fruits and vegetables. Natural fibers include cotton, wool, hemp, silk and flax. Specific crops are cultivated in distinct growing regions throughout the world. Production is listed in millions of metric tons, based on FAO estimates.

Top agricultural products, by crop types (million tonnes) 2004 data
Cereals	2,263
Vegetables and melons	866
Roots and tubers	715
Milk	619
Fruit	503
Meat	259
Oilcrops	133
Fish (2001 estimate)	130
Eggs	63
Pulses	60
Vegetable fiber	30
Source: Food and Agriculture Organization

Top agricultural products, by individual crops (million tonnes) 2011 data
Sugar cane	1794
Maize	883
Rice	722
Wheat	704
Potatoes	374
Sugar beet	271
Soybeans	260
Cassava	252
Tomatoes	159
Barley	134
Source: Food and Agriculture Organization

=== Livestock production systems ===
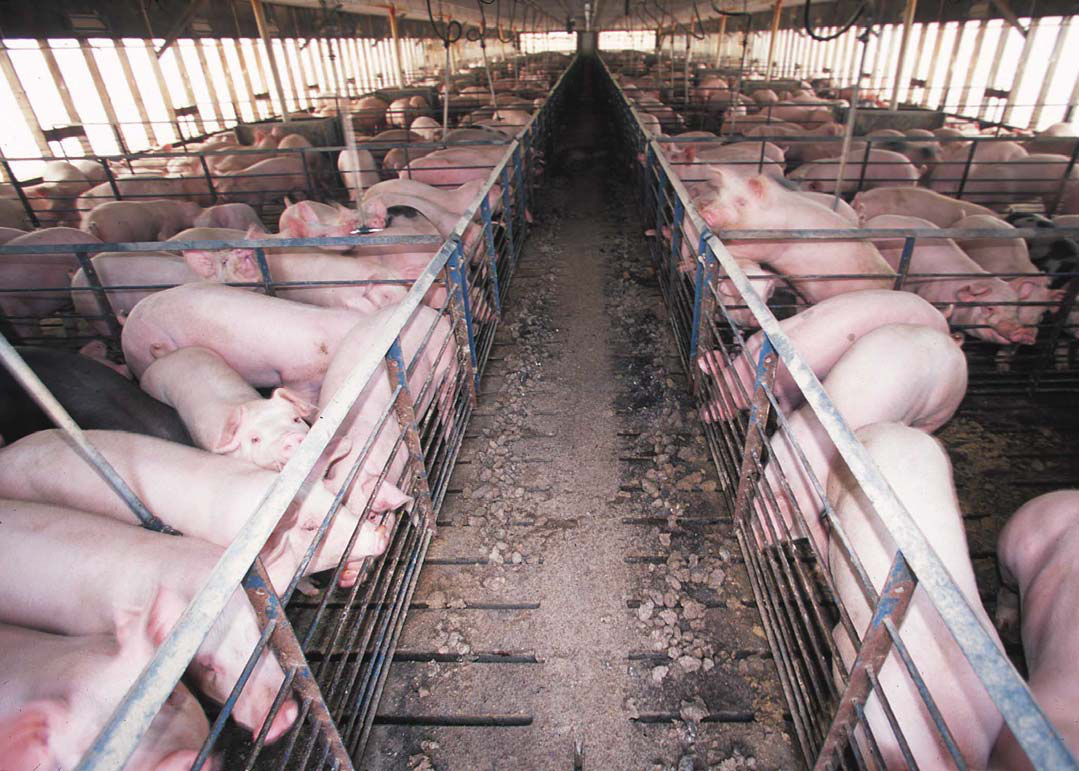
Intensively farmed pigs

Animal husbandry is the breeding and raising of animals for meat, milk, eggs, or wool, and for work and transport. Working animals, including horses, mules, oxen, water buffalo, camels, llamas, alpacas, donkeys, and dogs, have for centuries been used to help cultivate fields, harvest crops, wrangle other animals, and transport farm products to buyers.

Livestock production systems can be defined based on feed source, as grassland-based, mixed, and landless. As of 2010, 30% of Earth's ice- and water-free area was used for producing livestock, with the sector employing approximately 1.3 billion people. Between the 1960s and the 2000s, there was a significant increase in livestock production, both by numbers and by carcass weight, especially among beef, pigs and chickens, the latter of which had production increased by almost a factor of 10. Non-meat animals, such as milk cows and egg-producing chickens, also showed significant production increases. Global cattle, sheep and goat populations are expected to continue to increase sharply through 2050. Aquaculture or fish farming, the production of fish for human consumption in confined operations, is one of the fastest growing sectors of food production, growing at an average of 9% a year between 1975 and 2007.

During the second half of the 20th century, producers using selective breeding focused on creating livestock breeds and crossbreeds that increased production, while mostly disregarding the need to preserve genetic diversity. This trend has led to a significant decrease in genetic diversity and resources among livestock breeds, leading to a corresponding decrease in disease resistance and local adaptations previously found among traditional breeds.

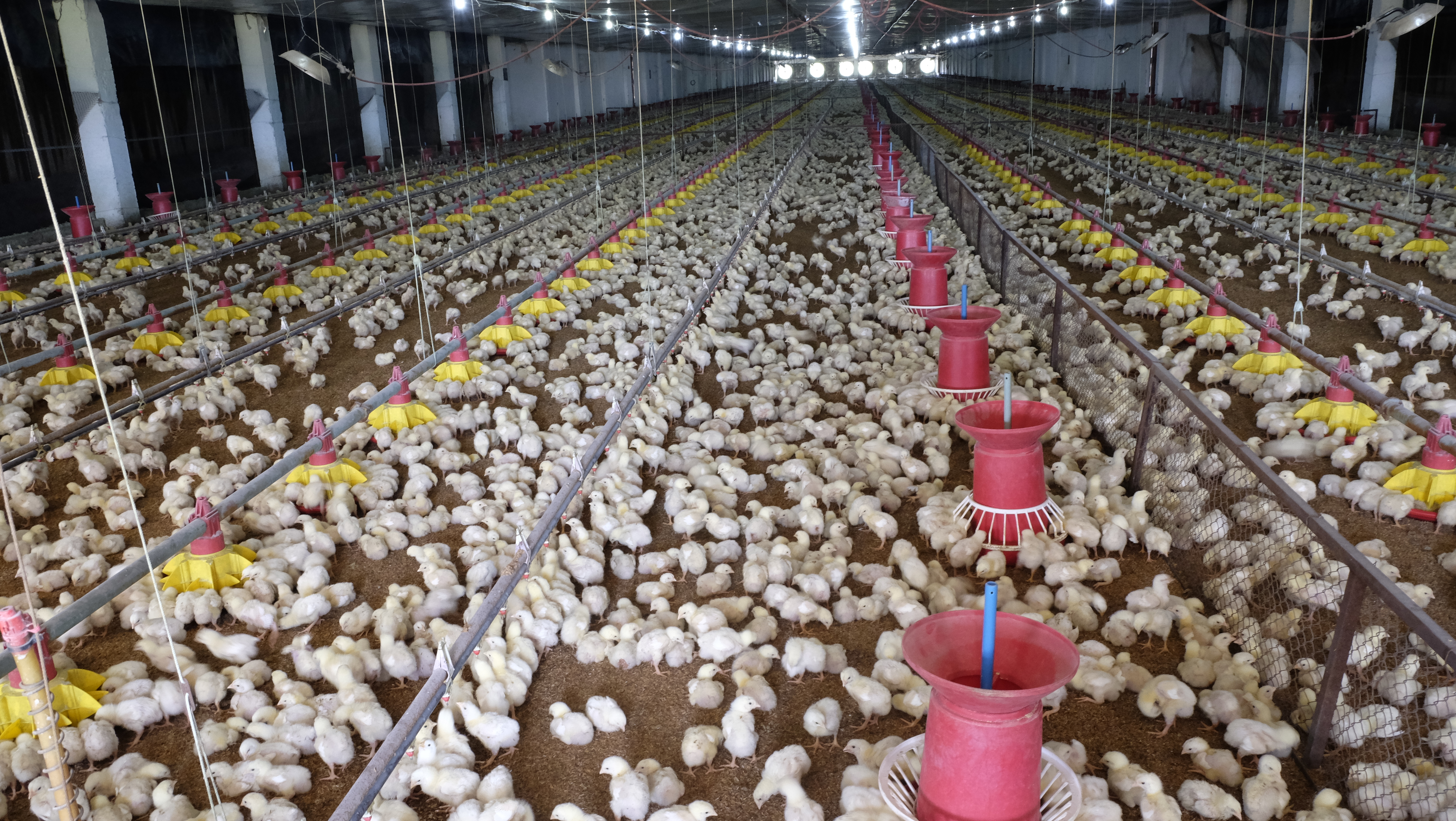
Raising chickens intensively for meat in a broiler house

Grassland based livestock production relies upon plant material such as shrubland, rangeland, and pastures for feeding ruminant animals. Outside nutrient inputs may be used, however manure is returned directly to the grassland as a major nutrient source. This system is particularly important in areas where crop production is not feasible because of climate or soil, representing 30–40 million pastoralists. Mixed production systems use grassland, fodder crops and grain feed crops as feed for ruminant and monogastric (one stomach; mainly chickens and pigs) livestock. Manure is typically recycled in mixed systems as a fertilizer for crops.

Landless systems rely upon feed from outside the farm, representing the de-linking of crop and livestock production found more prevalently in Organization for Economic Co-operation and Development member countries. Synthetic fertilizers are more heavily relied upon for crop production and manure use becomes a challenge as well as a source for pollution. Industrialized countries use these operations to produce much of the global supplies of poultry and pork. Scientists estimate that 75% of the growth in livestock production between 2003 and 2030 will be in confined animal feeding operations, sometimes called factory farming. Much of this growth is happening in developing countries in Asia, with much smaller amounts of growth in Africa. Some of the practices used in commercial livestock production, including the usage of growth hormones, are controversial.

=== Production practices ===
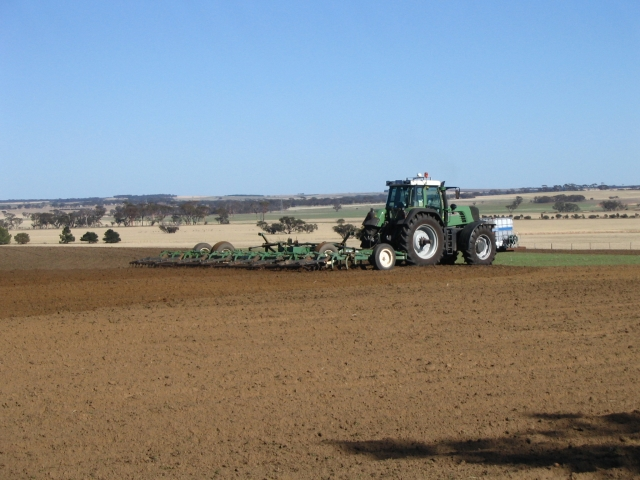
Tilling an arable field

Tillage is the practice of breaking up the soil with tools such as the plow or harrow to prepare for planting, for nutrient incorporation, or for pest control. Tillage varies in intensity from conventional to no-till. It can improve productivity by warming the soil, incorporating fertilizer and controlling weeds, but also renders soil more prone to erosion, triggers the decomposition of organic matter releasing CO_{2}, and reduces the abundance and diversity of soil organisms.

Pest control includes the management of weeds, insects, mites, and diseases. Chemical (pesticides), biological (biocontrol), mechanical (tillage), and cultural practices are used. Cultural practices include crop rotation, culling, cover crops, intercropping, composting, avoidance, and resistance. Integrated pest management attempts to use all of these methods to keep pest populations below the number which would cause economic loss, and recommends pesticides as a last resort.

Nutrient management includes both the source of nutrient inputs for crop and livestock production, and the method of use of manure produced by livestock. Nutrient inputs can be chemical inorganic fertilizers, manure, green manure, compost and minerals. Crop nutrient use may also be managed using cultural techniques such as crop rotation or a fallow period. Manure is used either by holding livestock where the feed crop is growing, such as in managed intensive rotational grazing, or by spreading either dry or liquid formulations of manure on cropland or pastures.

Water management is needed where rainfall is insufficient or variable, which occurs to some degree in most regions of the world. Some farmers use irrigation to supplement rainfall. In other areas such as the Great Plains in the US and Canada, farmers use a fallow year to conserve soil moisture for the following year. Recent technological innovations in precision agriculture allow for water status monitoring and automate water usage, leading to more efficient management. Agriculture represents 70% of freshwater use worldwide. However, water withdrawal ratios for agriculture vary significantly by income level. In least developed countries and landlocked developing countries, water withdrawal ratios for agriculture are as high as 90 percent of total water withdrawals and about 60 percent in Small Island Developing States.

According to 2014 report by the International Food Policy Research Institute, agricultural technologies will have the greatest impact on food production if adopted in combination with each other. Using a model that assessed how eleven technologies could impact agricultural productivity, food security and trade by 2050, the International Food Policy Research Institute found that the number of people at risk from hunger could be reduced by as much as 40% and food prices could be reduced by almost half.

Payment for ecosystem services is a method of providing additional incentives to encourage farmers to conserve some aspects of the environment. Measures might include paying for reforestation upstream of a city, to improve the supply of fresh water.

=== Automation ===
Different definitions exist for agricultural automation and for the variety of tools and technologies that are used to automate production. One view is that agricultural automation refers to autonomous navigation by robots without human intervention. Alternatively, it is defined as the accomplishment of production tasks through mobile, autonomous, decision-making, mechatronic devices. However, FAO finds that these definitions do not capture all the aspects and forms of automation, such as robotic milking machines that are static, most motorized machinery that automates the performing of agricultural operations, and digital tools (e.g., sensors) that automate only diagnosis. FAO defines agricultural automation as the use of machinery and equipment in agricultural operations to improve their diagnosis, decision-making or performing, reducing the drudgery of agricultural work or improving the timeliness, and potentially the precision, of agricultural operations.

The technological evolution in agriculture has involved a progressive move from manual tools to animal traction, to motorized mechanization, to digital equipment and finally, to robotics with artificial intelligence (AI). Motorized mechanization using engine power automates the performance of agricultural operations such as ploughing and milking. With digital automation technologies, it also becomes possible to automate diagnosis and decision-making of agricultural operations. For example, autonomous crop robots can harvest and seed crops, while drones can gather information to help automate input application. Precision agriculture often employs such automation technologies. Motorized machines are increasingly complemented, or even superseded, by new digital equipment that automates diagnosis and decision-making. A conventional tractor, for example, can be converted into an automated vehicle allowing it to sow a field autonomously.

Motorized mechanization has increased significantly across the world in recent years, although reliable global data with broad country coverage exist only for tractors and only up to 2009. Sub-Saharan Africa is the only region where the adoption of motorized mechanization has stalled over the past decades.

Automation technologies are increasingly used for managing livestock, though evidence on adoption is lacking. Global automatic milking system sales have increased over recent years, but adoption is likely mostly in Northern Europe, and likely almost absent in low- and middle-income countries. Automated feeding machines for both cows and poultry also exist, but data and evidence regarding their adoption trends and drivers is likewise scarce.

Measuring the overall employment impacts of agricultural automation is difficult because it requires large amounts of data tracking all the transformations and the associated reallocation of workers both upstream and downstream. While automation technologies reduce labor needs for the newly automated tasks, they also generate new labor demand for other tasks, such as equipment maintenance and operation. Agricultural automation can also stimulate employment by allowing producers to expand production and by creating other agrifood systems jobs. This is especially true when it happens in context of rising scarcity of rural labor, as is the case in high-income countries and many middle-income countries. On the other hand, if forcedly promoted, for example through government subsidies in contexts of abundant rural labor, it can lead to labor displacement and falling or stagnant wages, particularly affecting poor and low-skilled workers.

=== Effects of climate change on yields ===
The sixth IPCC Assessment Report projects changes in average soil moisture at 2.0 °C of warming, as measured in standard deviations from the 1850 to 1900 baseline.

Climate change and agriculture are interrelated on a global scale. Climate change affects agriculture through changes in average temperatures, rainfall, and weather extremes (like storms and heat waves); changes in pests and diseases; changes in atmospheric carbon dioxide and ground-level ozone concentrations; changes in the nutritional quality of some foods; and changes in sea level. Global warming is already affecting agriculture, with effects unevenly distributed across the world.

In a 2022 report, the Intergovernmental Panel on Climate Change describes how human-induced warming has slowed growth of agricultural productivity over the past 50 years in mid and low latitudes. Methane emissions have negatively impacted crop yields by increasing temperatures and surface ozone concentrations. Warming is also negatively affecting crop and grassland quality and harvest stability. Ocean warming has decreased sustainable yields of some wild fish populations while ocean acidification and warming have already affected farmed aquatic species. Climate change will probably increase the risk of food insecurity for some vulnerable groups, such as the poor.

=== Predictions ===
In order to meet the demands of a growing global population, agriculture needs to produce about 50% more food, feed and fibre by 2050 compared with the volumes it generated in 2012, according to estimates by the Food and Agriculture Organization of the United Nations (FAO). Achieving such objectives will place additional pressure on the world's already overstretched water, land and soil resources. In an increasing number of regions, food security and agrifood systems are at risk from unsustainable natural resource management practices, urban expansion, higher demand for food, water, energy and biomaterials, and persisting social and gender inequalities in access to and governance of resources.

== Crop alteration and biotechnology ==
=== Plant breeding ===
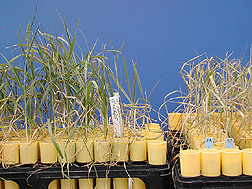
Wheat cultivar tolerant of high salinity (left) compared with non-tolerant variety

Crop alteration has been practiced by humankind for thousands of years, since the beginning of civilization. Altering crops through breeding practices changes the genetic make-up of a plant to develop crops with more beneficial characteristics for humans, for example, larger fruits or seeds, drought-tolerance, or resistance to pests. Significant advances in plant breeding ensued after the work of geneticist Gregor Mendel. His work on dominant and recessive alleles, although initially largely ignored for almost 50 years, gave plant breeders a better understanding of genetics and breeding techniques. Crop breeding includes techniques such as plant selection with desirable traits, self-pollination and cross-pollination, and molecular techniques that genetically modify the organism.

Domestication of plants has, over the centuries increased yield, improved disease resistance and drought tolerance, eased harvest and improved the taste and nutritional value of crop plants. Careful selection and breeding have had enormous effects on the characteristics of crop plants. Plant selection and breeding in the 1920s and 1930s improved pasture (grasses and clover) in New Zealand. Extensive X-ray and ultraviolet induced mutagenesis efforts (i.e. primitive genetic engineering) during the 1950s produced the modern commercial varieties of grains such as wheat, corn (maize) and barley.

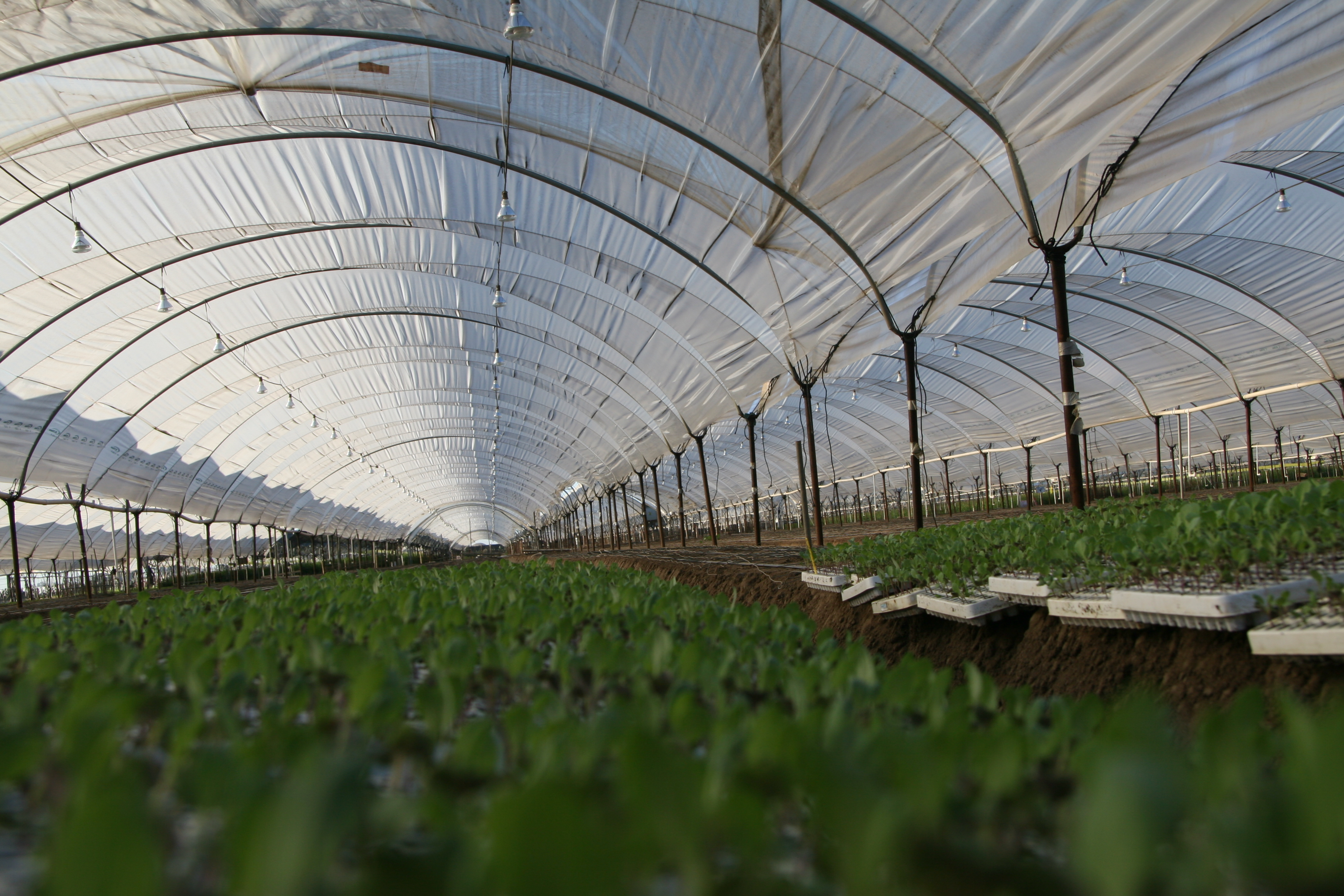
Seedlings in a greenhouse, as used for plant breeding

The Green Revolution popularized the use of conventional hybridization to sharply increase yield by creating "high-yielding varieties". For example, average yields of corn (maize) in the US have increased from around 2.5 tons per hectare (t/ha) (40 bushels per acre) in 1900 to about 9.4 t/ha (150 bushels per acre) in 2001. Similarly, worldwide average wheat yields have increased from less than 1 t/ha in 1900 to more than 2.5 t/ha in 1990. South American average wheat yields are around 2 t/ha, African under 1 t/ha, and Egypt and Arabia up to 3.5 to 4 t/ha with irrigation. In contrast, the average wheat yield in countries such as France is over 8 t/ha. Variations in yields are due mainly to variation in climate, genetics, and the level of intensive farming techniques (use of fertilizers, chemical pest control, and growth control to avoid lodging).

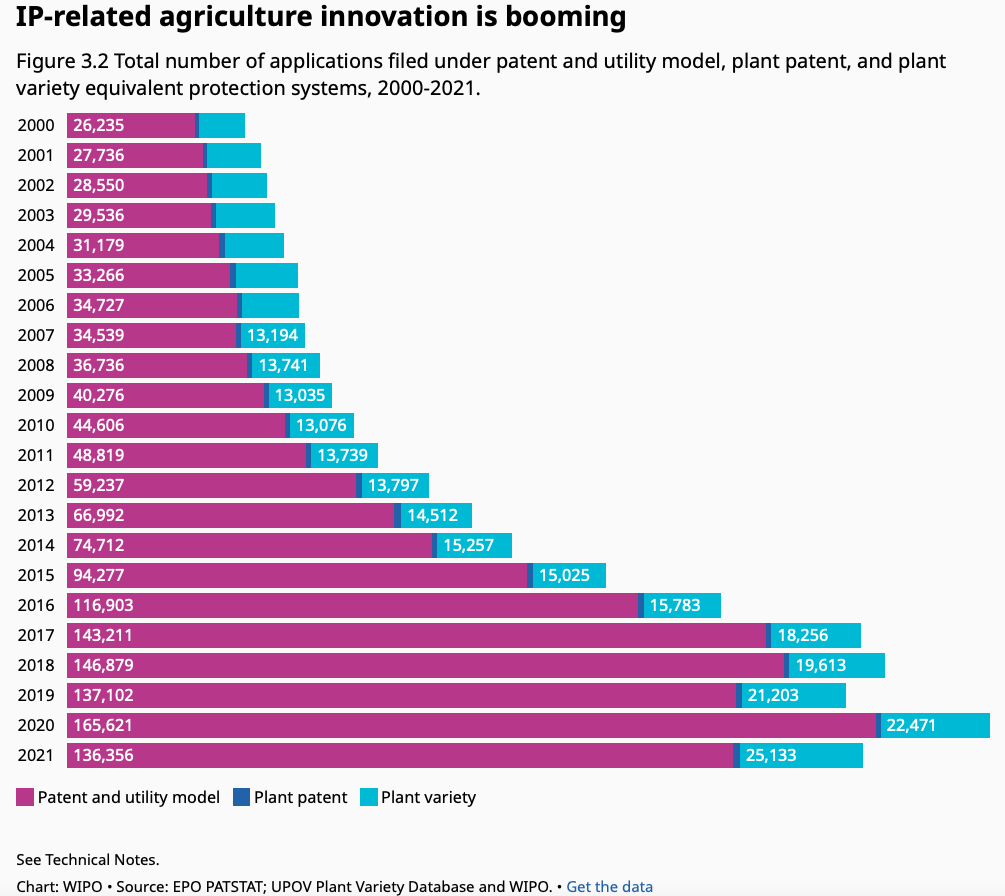
Increase of intellectual property protection for agri inventions, as seen in the total number of patents, utility models and plant varieties equivalent protection systems applied for on agricultural innovation worldwide.

Investments into innovation for agriculture are long term. This is because it takes time for research to become commercialized and for technology to be adapted to meet multiple regions' needs, as well as meet national guidelines before being adopted and planted in a farmer's fields. For instance, it took at least 60 years from the introduction of hybrid corn technology before its adoption became widespread.

Agricultural innovation developed for the specific agroecological conditions of one region is not easily transferred and used in another region with different agroecological conditions. Instead, the innovation would have to be adapted to the specific conditions of that other region and respect its biodiversity and environmental requirements and guidelines. Some such adaptations can be seen through the steadily increasing number of plant varieties protected under the plant variety protection instrument administered by the International Union for the Protection of New Varieties of Plants (UPOV).

=== Genetic engineering ===
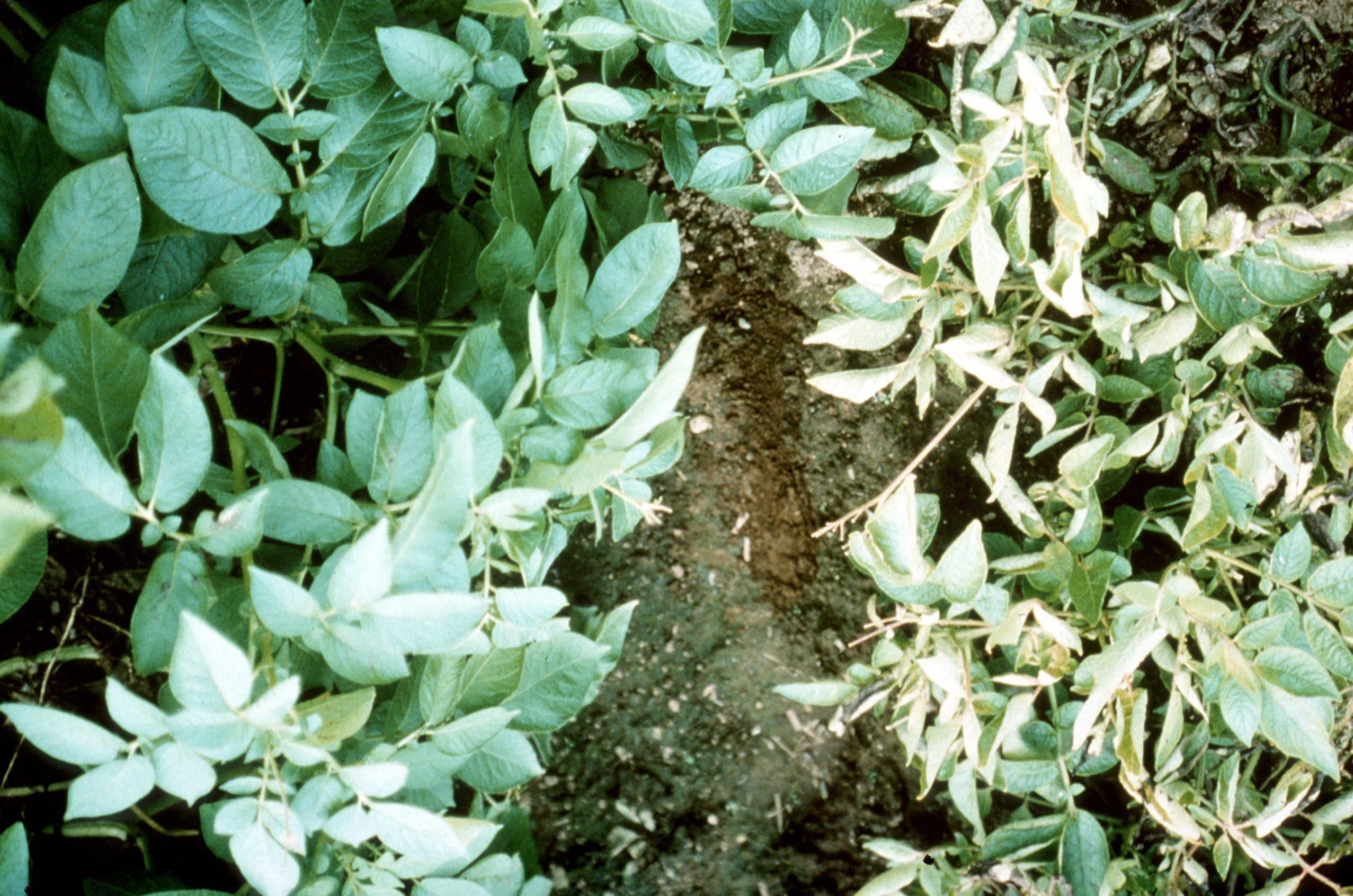
Genetically modified potato plants (left) resist virus diseases that damage unmodified plants (right).

Genetically modified organisms (GMO) are organisms whose genetic material has been altered by genetic engineering techniques generally known as recombinant DNA technology. Genetic engineering has expanded the genes available to breeders to use in creating desired germlines for new crops. Increased durability, nutritional content, insect and virus resistance and herbicide tolerance are a few of the attributes bred into crops through genetic engineering. For some, GMO crops cause food safety and food labeling concerns. Numerous countries have placed restrictions on the production, import or use of GMO foods and crops. The Biosafety Protocol, an international treaty, regulates the trade of GMOs. There is ongoing discussion regarding the labeling of foods made from GMOs, and the EU has had GMO food labeling requirements since 1997. As of 2022, the United States requires food containing GMO ingredients to be labeled as well.

Herbicide-resistant seeds have a gene implanted into their genome that allows the plants to tolerate exposure to herbicides, including glyphosate. These seeds allow the farmer to grow a crop that can be sprayed with herbicides to control weeds without harming the resistant crop. Herbicide-tolerant crops are used by farmers worldwide. With the increasing use of herbicide-tolerant crops, comes an increase in the use of glyphosate-based herbicide sprays. In some areas glyphosate resistant weeds have developed, causing farmers to switch to other herbicides. Some studies also link widespread glyphosate usage to iron deficiencies in some crops, which is both a crop production and a nutritional quality concern, with potential economic and health implications.

Other GMO crops used by growers include insect-resistant crops, which have a gene from the soil bacterium Bacillus thuringiensis (Bt), which produces a toxin specific to insects. These crops resist damage by insects. Some believe that similar or better pest-resistance traits can be acquired through traditional breeding practices, and resistance to various pests can be gained through hybridization or cross-pollination with wild species. In some cases, wild species are the primary source of resistance traits; some tomato cultivars that have gained resistance to at least 19 diseases did so through crossing with wild populations of tomatoes.

== Environmental impact ==
=== Effects and costs ===
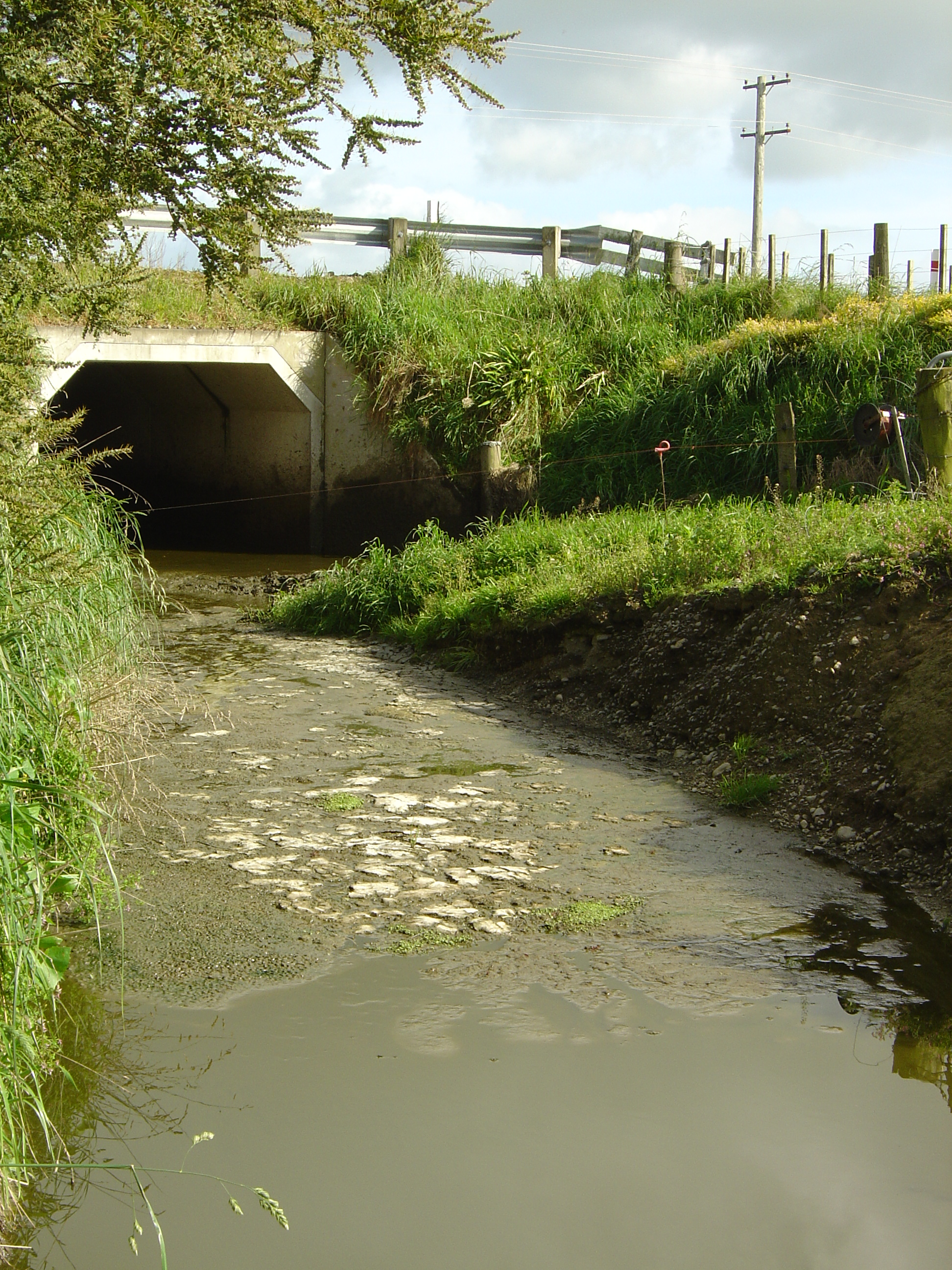
Water pollution in a rural stream due to runoff from farming activity in New Zealand

Agriculture is both a cause of environmental degradation and sensitive to environmental degradation, such as biodiversity loss, desertification, soil degradation and climate change, which cause decreases in crop yield. Agriculture is one of the most important drivers of environmental pressures, particularly habitat change, climate change, water use and toxic emissions. Agriculture is the main source of toxins released into the environment, including insecticides, especially those used on cotton. The 2011 UNEP Green Economy report stated that agricultural operations produced some 13 percent of anthropogenic global greenhouse gas emissions. This includes gases from the use of inorganic fertilizers, agro-chemical pesticides, and herbicides, as well as fossil fuel-energy inputs.

Agriculture imposes multiple external costs upon society through effects such as pesticide damage to nature (especially herbicides and insecticides), nutrient runoff, excessive water usage, and loss of natural environment. A 2000 assessment of agriculture in the UK determined total external costs for 1996 of £2,343 million, or £208 per hectare. A 2005 analysis of these costs in the US concluded that cropland imposes approximately $5 to $16 billion ($30 to $96 per hectare), while livestock production imposes $714 million. Both studies, which focused solely on the fiscal impacts, concluded that more should be done to internalize external costs. Neither included subsidies in their analysis, but they noted that subsidies also influence the cost of agriculture to society.

Agriculture seeks to increase yield and to reduce costs, often employing measures that cut biodiversity to very low levels. Yield increases with inputs such as fertilizers and removal of pathogens, predators, and competitors (such as weeds). Costs decrease with increasing scale of farm units, such as making fields larger; this means removing hedges, ditches and other areas of habitat. Pesticides kill insects, plants and fungi. Effective yields fall with on-farm losses, which may be caused by poor production practices during harvesting, handling, and storage.

The environmental effects of climate change show that research on pests and diseases that do not generally afflict areas is essential. In 2021, farmers discovered stem rust on wheat in the Champagne area of France, a disease that had previously only occurred in Morocco for 20 to 30 years. Because of climate change, insects that used to die off over the winter are now alive and multiplying.

=== Livestock issues ===
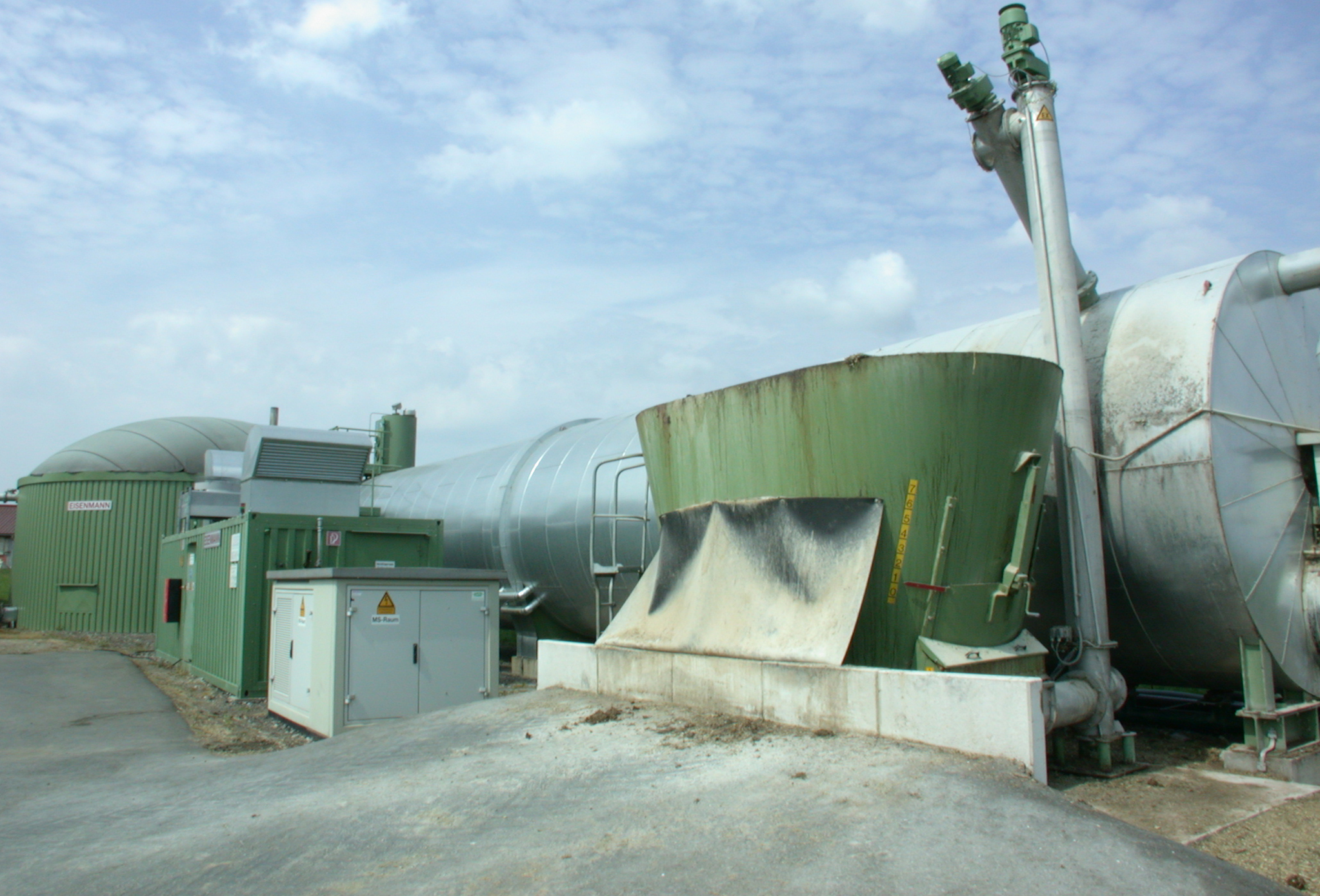
Farmyard anaerobic digester converts waste plant material and manure from livestock into biogas fuel.

A senior UN official, Henning Steinfeld, said that "Livestock are one of the most significant contributors to today's most serious environmental problems". Livestock production occupies 70% of all land used for agriculture, or 30% of the land surface of the planet. It is one of the largest sources of greenhouse gases, responsible for 18% of the world's greenhouse gas emissions as measured in CO_{2} equivalents. By comparison, all transportation emits 13.5% of the CO_{2}. (This comparison later turned out to be an apples-and-oranges analogy.) It produces 65% of human-related nitrous oxide (which has 296 times the global warming potential of CO_{2}) and 37% of all human-induced methane (which is 23 times as warming as CO_{2}.) It also generates 64% of the ammonia emission. Livestock expansion is cited as a key factor driving deforestation; in the Amazon basin 70% of previously forested area is now occupied by pastures and the remainder used for feed crops. Through deforestation and land degradation, livestock is also driving reductions in biodiversity. A well documented phenomenon is woody plant encroachment, caused by overgrazing in rangelands. Furthermore, the United Nations Environment Programme (UNEP) states that "methane emissions from global livestock are projected to increase by 60 percent by 2030 under current practices and consumption patterns."

=== Land and water issues ===
Countries with the highest share of water withdrawal by agriculture in total withdrawal (2022)

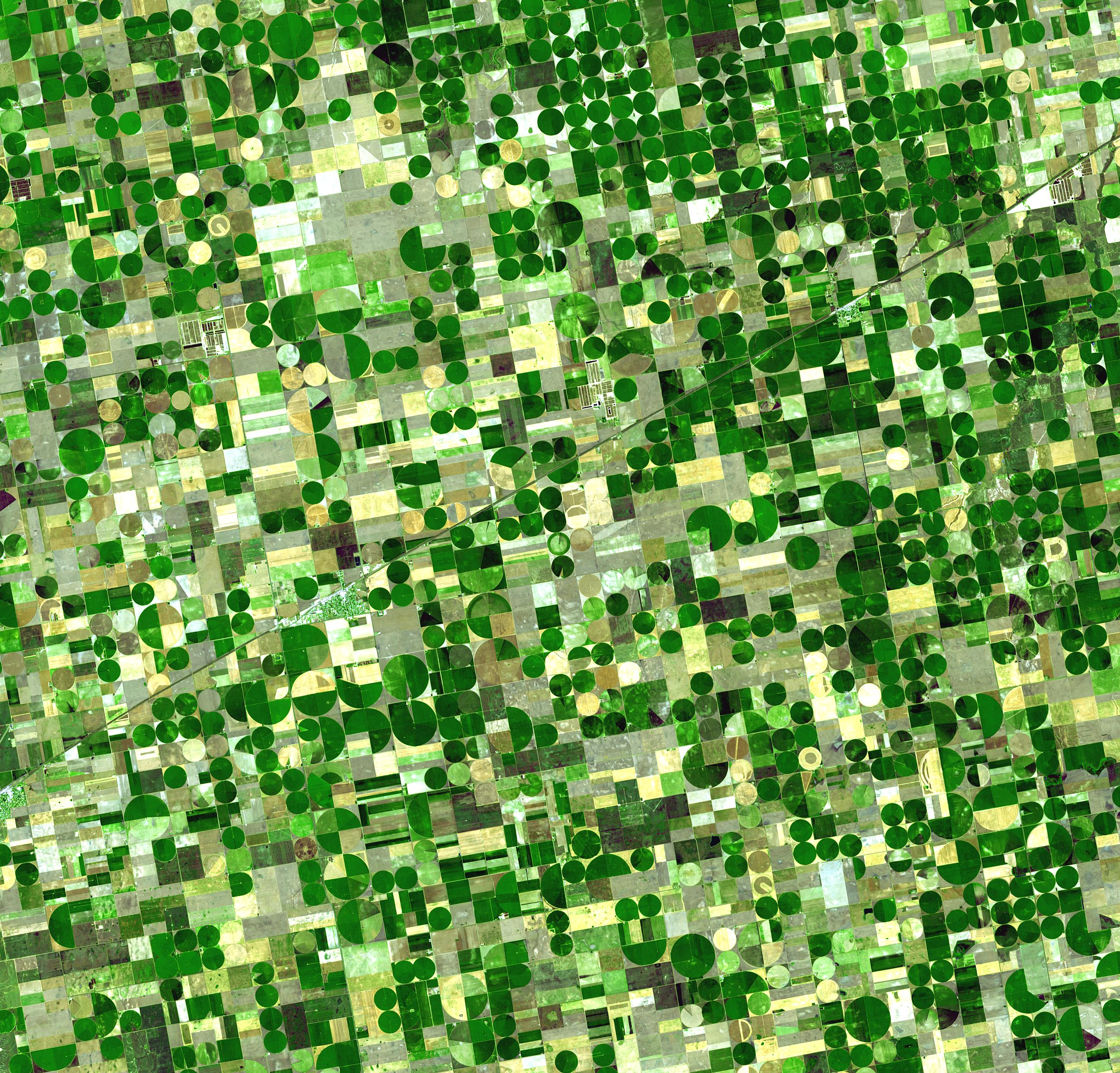
Circular irrigated crop fields in Kansas. Healthy, growing crops of corn and sorghum are green (sorghum may be slightly paler). Wheat is brilliant gold. Fields of brown have been recently harvested and plowed or have lain in fallow for the year.

Land transformation, the use of land to yield goods and services, is the most substantial way humans alter the Earth's ecosystems, and is the driving force causing biodiversity loss. Estimates of the amount of land transformed by humans vary from 39 to 50%. It is estimated that 24% of land globally experiences land degradation, a long-term decline in ecosystem function and productivity, with cropland being disproportionately affected. Land management is the driving factor behind degradation; 1.5 billion people rely upon the degrading land. Degradation can be through deforestation, desertification, soil erosion, mineral depletion, acidification, or salinization. In 2021, the global agricultural land area was 4.79 billion hectares (ha), down 2 percent, or 0.09 billion ha compared with 2000. Between 2000 and 2021, roughly two-thirds of agricultural land were used for permanent meadows and pastures (3.21 billion ha in 2021), which declined by 5 percent (0.17 billion ha). One-third of the total agricultural land was cropland (1.58 billion ha in 2021), which increased by 6 percent (0.09 billion ha). Within the U.S., total agricultural land use is estimated to be 56%, and including grazing, animal agriculture constitutes around 80% of agricultural land.

Eutrophication, excessive nutrient enrichment in aquatic ecosystems resulting in algal blooms and anoxia, leads to fish kills, loss of biodiversity, and renders water unfit for drinking and other industrial uses. Excessive fertilization and manure application to cropland, as well as high livestock stocking densities cause nutrient (mainly nitrogen and phosphorus) runoff and leaching from agricultural land. These nutrients are major nonpoint pollutants contributing to eutrophication of aquatic ecosystems and pollution of groundwater, with harmful effects on human populations. Fertilizers also reduce terrestrial biodiversity by increasing competition for light, favoring those species that are able to benefit from the added nutrients.

Agriculture simultaneously is facing growing freshwater demand and precipitation anomalies (droughts, floods, and extreme rainfall and weather events) on rainfed areas fields and grazing lands. Agriculture accounts for 70 percent of withdrawals of freshwater resources, and an estimated 41 percent of current global irrigation water use occurs at the expense of environmental flow requirements. Within the U.S., agriculture accounts for about 80% of total water consumption, with animal agriculture making up half of agricultural consumption (around 40%). It is long known that aquifers in areas as diverse as northern China, the Upper Ganges and the western US are being depleted, and new research extends these problems to aquifers in Iran, Mexico and Saudi Arabia. Increasing pressure is being placed on water resources by industry and urban areas, meaning that water scarcity is increasing and agriculture is facing the challenge of producing more food for the world's growing population with reduced water resources. While industrial withdrawals have declined in the past few decades and municipal withdrawals have increased only marginally since 2010, agricultural withdrawals have continued to grow at an ever faster pace. Agricultural water usage can also cause major environmental problems, including the destruction of natural wetlands, the spread of water-borne diseases, and land degradation through salinization and waterlogging, when irrigation is performed incorrectly.

=== Pesticides ===
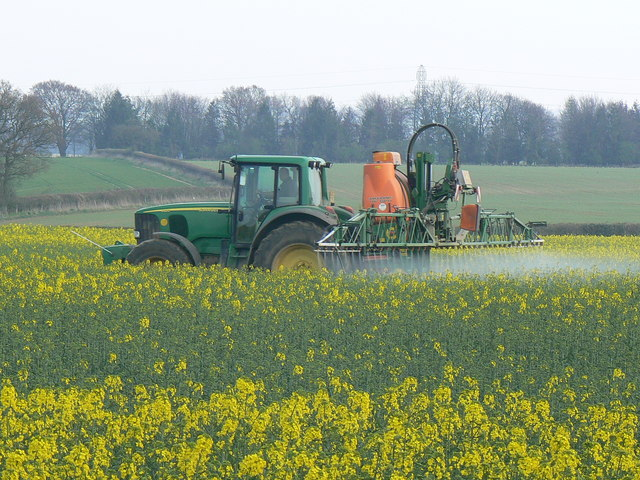
Spraying a crop with a pesticide

Pesticide use has increased since 1950 to 2.5 million short tons annually worldwide, yet crop loss from pests has remained relatively constant. The World Health Organization estimated in 1992 that three million pesticide poisonings occur annually, causing 220,000 deaths. Pesticides select for pesticide resistance in the pest population, leading to a condition termed the "pesticide treadmill" in which pest resistance warrants the development of a new pesticide.

An alternative argument is that the way to "save the environment" and prevent famine is by using pesticides and intensive high yield farming, a view exemplified by a quote heading the Center for Global Food Issues website: 'Growing more per acre leaves more land for nature'. However, critics argue that a trade-off between the environment and a need for food is not inevitable, and that pesticides can replace good agronomic practices such as crop rotation. The Push–pull agricultural pest management technique involves intercropping, using plant aromas to repel pests from crops (push) and to lure them to a place from which they can then be removed (pull).

=== Contribution to climate change ===
World farm-gate greenhouse gas emissions by activity

Agriculture contributes towards climate change through greenhouse gas emissions and by the conversion of non-agricultural land such as forests into agricultural land. The agriculture, forestry and land use sector contribute between 13% and 21% of global greenhouse gas emissions. Emissions of nitrous oxide, methane make up over half of total greenhouse gas emission from agriculture. Animal husbandry is a major source of greenhouse gas emissions.

Approximately 57% of global GHG emissions from the production of food are from the production of animal-based food while plant-based foods contribute 29% and the remaining 14% is for other utilizations. Farmland management and land-use change represented major shares of total emissions (38% and 29%, respectively), whereas rice and beef were the largest contributing plant- and animal-based commodities (12% and 25%, respectively). South and Southeast Asia and South America were the largest emitters of production-based GHGs.

=== Effects of climate change on agriculture ===
Climate change put significant part of crops in danger already at 1.5 degrees of warming. While in North America, Europe and central Asia the share of endangered crops is relatively little at this level of warming, in the Middle east and North Africa region for example, close to 50% of cropland is in danger. With further temperature rise the risk increase in all regions, in some more, in some less. Globally the cropland area in safe climatic zone decrease for all the major crop groups as warming exceed 1.5 degrees.

=== Sustainability ===
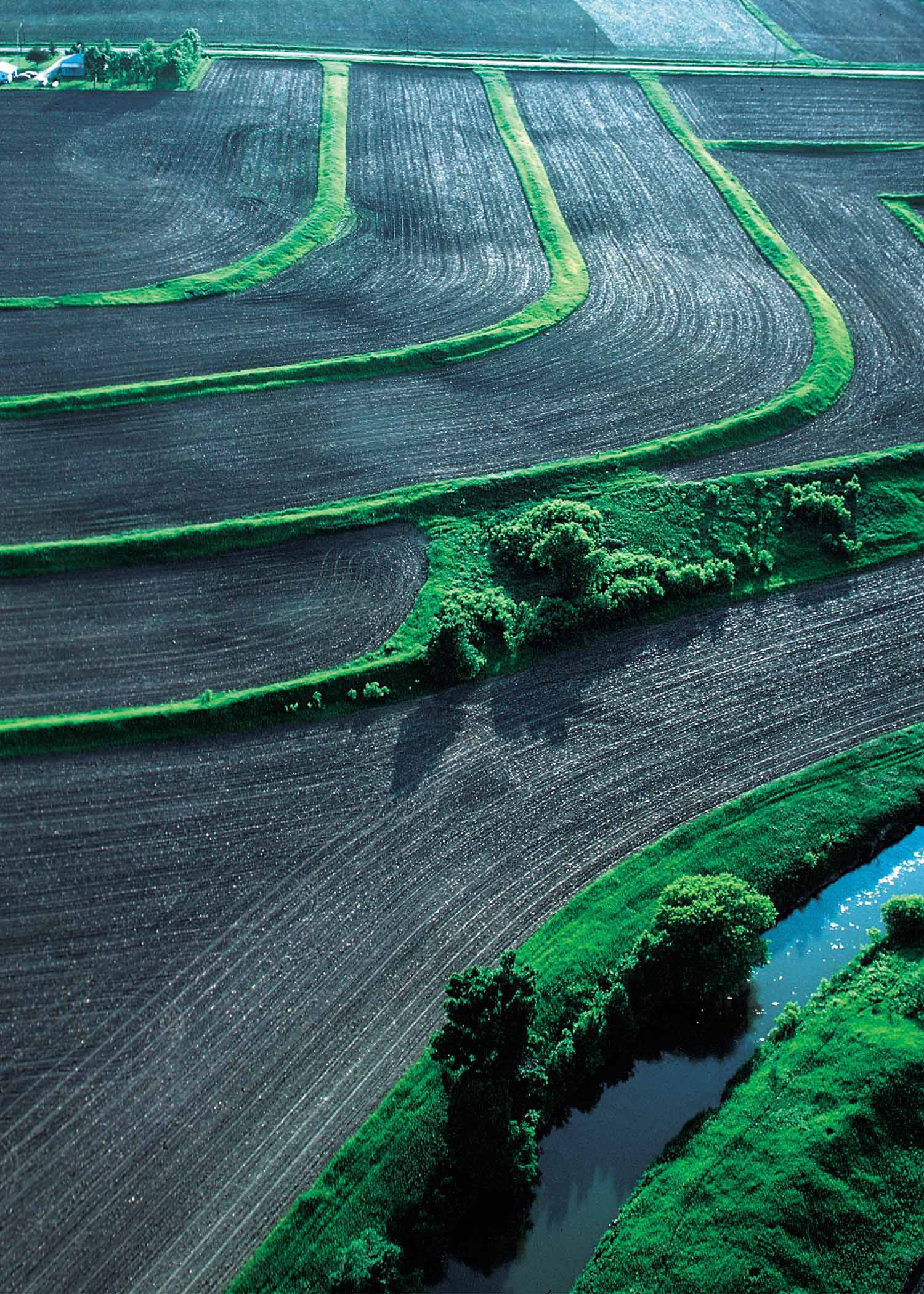
Terraces, conservation tillage and conservation buffers reduce soil erosion and water pollution on this farm in Iowa.

Current farming methods have resulted in over-stretched water resources, high levels of erosion and reduced soil fertility. There is not enough water to continue farming using current practices; therefore how water, land, and ecosystem resources are used to boost crop yields must be reconsidered. A solution would be to give value to ecosystems, recognizing environmental and livelihood tradeoffs, and balancing the rights of a variety of users and interests. Inequities that result when such measures are adopted would need to be addressed, such as the reallocation of water from poor to rich, the clearing of land to make way for more productive farmland, or the preservation of a wetland system that limits fishing rights.

Technological advancements help provide farmers with tools and resources to make farming more sustainable. Technology permits innovations like conservation tillage, a farming process which helps prevent land loss to erosion, reduces water pollution, and enhances carbon sequestration.

Agricultural automation can help address some of the challenges associated with climate change and thus facilitate adaptation efforts. For example, the application of digital automation technologies (e.g. in precision agriculture) can improve resource-use efficiency in conditions which are increasingly constrained for agricultural producers. Moreover, when applied to sensing and early warning, they can help address the uncertainty and unpredictability of weather conditions associated with accelerating climate change.

Other potential sustainable practices include conservation agriculture, agroforestry, improved grazing, avoided grassland conversion, and biochar. Current mono-crop farming practices in the United States preclude widespread adoption of sustainable practices, such as 2–3 crop rotations that incorporate grass or hay with annual crops, unless negative emission goals such as soil carbon sequestration become policy.

The food demand of Earth's projected population, with current climate change predictions, could be satisfied by improvement of agricultural methods, expansion of agricultural areas, and a sustainability-oriented consumer mindset.

=== Energy dependence ===
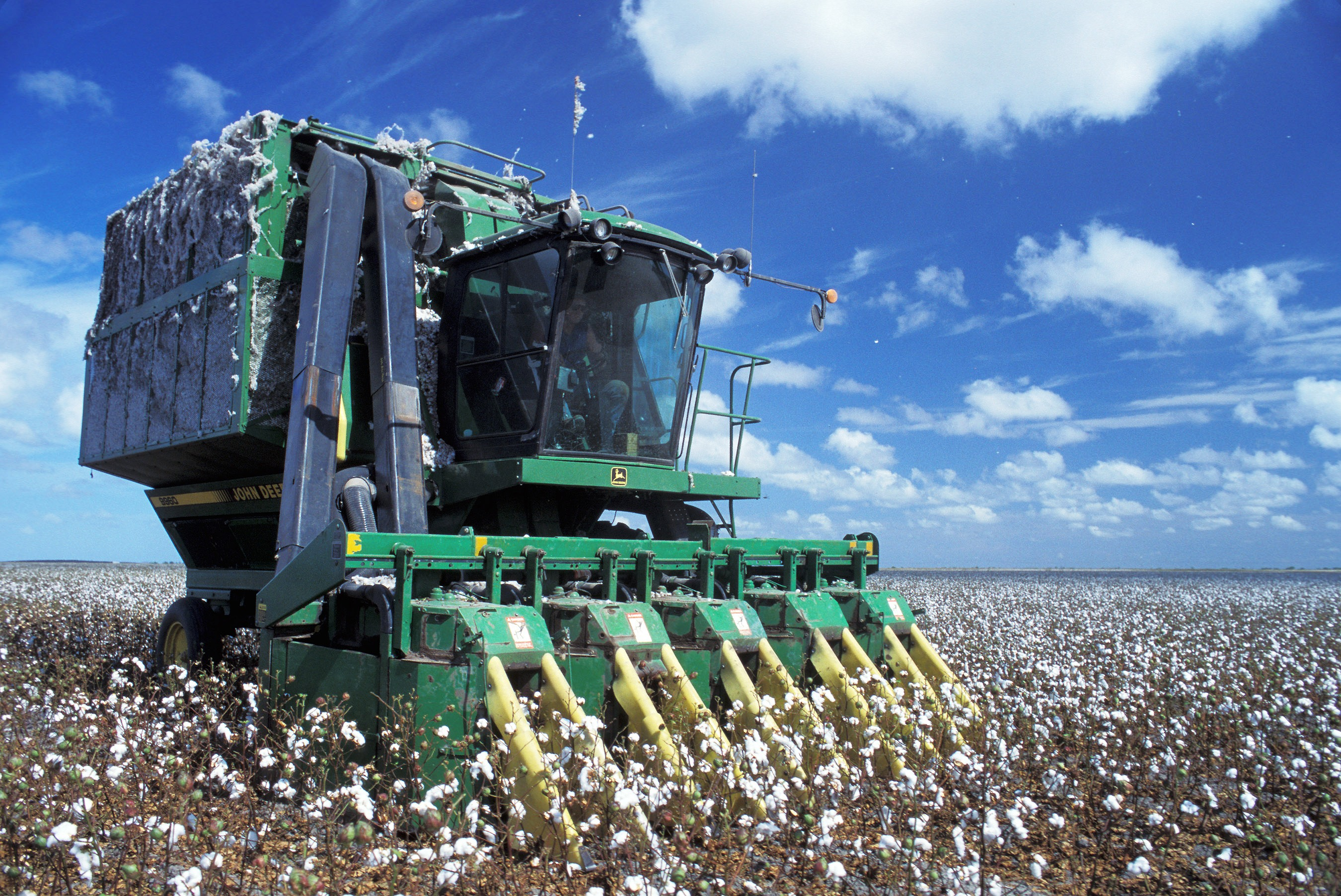
Mechanized agriculture: from the first models in the 1940s, tools like a cotton picker could replace 50 farm workers, at the price of increased use of fossil fuel.

Since the 1940s, agricultural productivity has increased dramatically, due largely to the increased use of energy-intensive mechanization, fertilizers and pesticides. The vast majority of this energy input comes from fossil fuel sources. Between the 1960s and the 1980s, the Green Revolution transformed agriculture around the globe, with world grain production increasing significantly (between 70% and 390% for wheat and 60% to 150% for rice, depending on geographic area) as world population doubled. Heavy reliance on petrochemicals has raised concerns that oil shortages could increase costs and reduce agricultural output.

Industrialized agriculture depends on fossil fuels in two fundamental ways: direct consumption on the farm and manufacture of inputs used on the farm. Direct consumption includes the use of lubricants and fuels to operate farm vehicles and machinery.

Indirect consumption includes the manufacture of fertilizers, pesticides, and farm machinery. In particular, the production of nitrogen fertilizer can account for over half of agricultural energy usage. Together, direct and indirect consumption by US farms accounts for about 2% of the nation's energy use. Direct and indirect energy consumption by US farms peaked in 1979, and has since gradually declined. Food systems encompass not just agriculture but off-farm processing, packaging, transporting, marketing, consumption, and disposal of food and food-related items. Agriculture accounts for less than one-fifth of food system energy use in the US.

=== Plastic pollution ===
Plastic products are used extensively in agriculture, including to increase crop yields and improve the efficiency of water and agrichemical use. "Agriplastic" products include films to cover greenhouses and tunnels, mulch to cover soil (e.g. to suppress weeds, conserve water, increase soil temperature and aid fertilizer application), shade cloth, pesticide containers, seedling trays, protective mesh and irrigation tubing. The polymers most commonly used in these products are low-density polyethylene (LPDE), linear low-density polyethylene (LLDPE), polypropylene (PP) and polyvinyl chloride (PVC).

The total amount of plastics used in agriculture is difficult to quantify. A 2012 study reported that almost 6.5 million tonnes per year were consumed globally while a later study estimated that global demand in 2015 was between 7.3 million and 9 million tonnes. Widespread use of plastic mulch and lack of systematic collection and management have led to the generation of large amounts of mulch residue. Weathering and degradation eventually cause the mulch to fragment. These fragments and larger pieces of plastic accumulate in soil. Mulch residue has been measured at levels of 50 to 260 kg per hectare in topsoil in areas where mulch use dates back more than 10 years, which confirms that mulching is a major source of both microplastic and macroplastic soil contamination.

Agricultural plastics, especially plastic films, are not easy to recycle because of high contamination levels (up to 40–50% by weight contamination by pesticides, fertilizers, soil and debris, moist vegetation, silage juice water, and UV stabilizers) and collection difficulties. Therefore, they are often buried or abandoned in fields and watercourses or burned. These disposal practices lead to soil degradation and can result in contamination of soils and leakage of microplastics into the marine environment as a result of precipitation run-off and tidal washing. In addition, additives in residual plastic film (such as UV and thermal stabilizers) may have deleterious effects on crop growth, soil structure, nutrient transport and salt levels. There is a risk that plastic mulch will deteriorate soil quality, deplete soil organic matter stocks, increase soil water repellence and emit greenhouse gases. Microplastics released through fragmentation of agricultural plastics can absorb and concentrate contaminants capable of being passed up the trophic chain.

== Disciplines ==
=== Agricultural economics ===
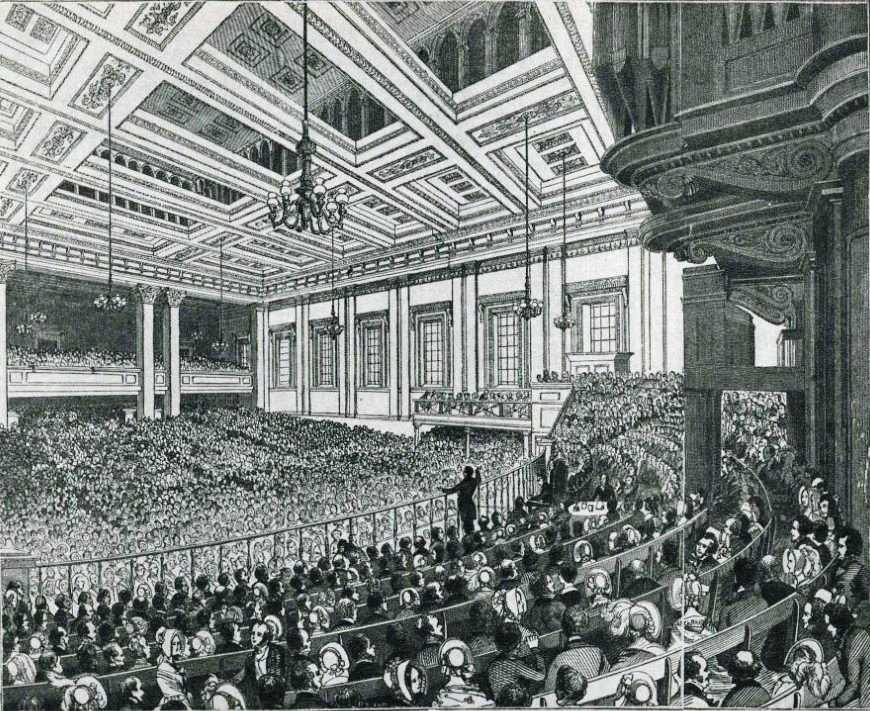
In 19th-century Britain, the protectionist Corn Laws led to high prices and widespread protest, such as this 1846 meeting of the Anti–Corn Law League.

Agricultural economics is economics as it relates to the "production, distribution and consumption of [agricultural] goods and services". Combining agricultural production with general theories of marketing and business as a discipline of study began in the late 1800s, and grew significantly through the 20th century. Although the study of agricultural economics is relatively recent, major trends in agriculture have significantly affected national and international economies throughout history, ranging from tenant farmers and sharecropping in the post–American Civil War Southern United States to the European feudal system of manorialism. In the United States, and elsewhere, food costs attributed to food processing, distribution, and agricultural marketing, sometimes referred to as the value chain, have risen while the costs attributed to farming have declined. This is related to the greater efficiency of farming, combined with the increased level of value addition (e.g. more highly processed products) provided by the supply chain. Market concentration has increased in the sector as well, and although the total effect of the increased market concentration is likely increased efficiency, the changes redistribute economic surplus from producers (farmers) and consumers, and may have negative implications for rural communities.

National government policies, such as taxation, subsidies, tariffs and others, can significantly change the economic marketplace for agricultural products. Since at least the 1960s, a combination of trade restrictions, exchange rate policies and subsidies have affected farmers in both the developing and the developed world. In the 1980s, non-subsidized farmers in developing countries experienced adverse effects from national policies that created artificially low global prices for farm products. Between the mid-1980s and the early 2000s, several international agreements limited agricultural tariffs, subsidies and other trade restrictions.

However, as of 2009, there was still a significant amount of policy-driven distortion in global agricultural product prices. The three agricultural products with the most trade distortion were sugar, milk and rice, mainly due to taxation. Among the oilseeds, sesame had the most taxation, but overall, feed grains and oilseeds had much lower levels of taxation than livestock products. Since the 1980s, policy-driven distortions have decreases more among livestock products than crops during the worldwide reforms in agricultural policy. Despite this progress, certain crops, such as cotton, still see subsidies in developed countries artificially deflating global prices, causing hardship in developing countries with non-subsidized farmers. Unprocessed commodities such as corn, soybeans, and cattle are generally graded to indicate quality, affecting the price the producer receives. Commodities are generally reported by production quantities, such as volume, number or weight.

=== Agricultural science ===
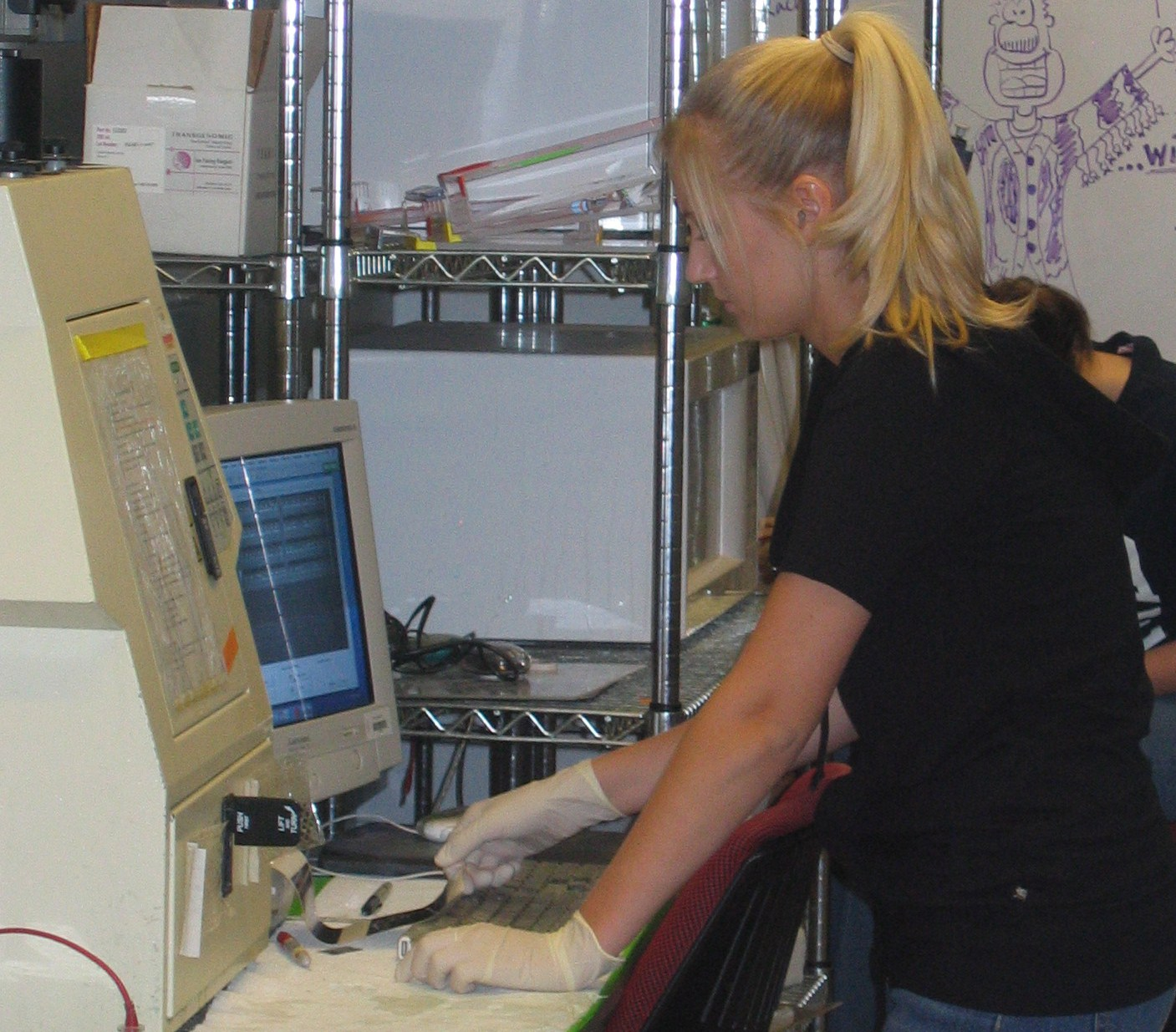
An agronomist mapping a plant genome

Agricultural science is a broad multidisciplinary field of biology that encompasses the parts of exact, natural, economic and social sciences used in the practice and understanding of agriculture. It covers topics such as agronomy, plant breeding and genetics, plant pathology, crop modeling, soil science, entomology, production techniques and improvement, study of pests and their management, and study of adverse environmental effects such as soil degradation, waste management, and bioremediation.

The scientific study of agriculture began in the 18th century, when Johann Friedrich Mayer conducted experiments on the use of gypsum (hydrated calcium sulphate) as a fertilizer. Research became more systematic when in 1843, John Lawes and Henry Gilbert began a set of long-term agronomy field experiments at Rothamsted Research Station in England; some of them, such as the Park Grass Experiment, are still running. In America, the Hatch Act of 1887 provided funding for what it was the first to call "agricultural science", driven by farmers' interest in fertilizers. In agricultural entomology, the USDA began to research biological control in 1881; it instituted its first large program in 1905, searching Europe and Japan for natural enemies of the spongy moth and brown-tail moth, establishing parasitoids (such as solitary wasps) and predators of both pests in the US.

== Policy ==
Direct subsidies for animal products and feed by OECD countries in 2012, in billions of US dollars
Product	Subsidy
Beef and veal	18.0
Milk	15.3
Pigs	7.3
Poultry	6.5
Soybeans	2.3
Eggs	1.5
Sheep	1.1

Agricultural policy is the set of government decisions and actions relating to domestic agriculture and imports of foreign agricultural products. Governments usually implement agricultural policies with the goal of achieving a specific outcome in the domestic agricultural product markets. Some overarching themes include risk management and adjustment (including policies related to climate change, food safety and natural disasters), economic stability (including policies related to taxes), natural resources and environmental sustainability (especially water policy), research and development, and market access for domestic commodities (including relations with global organizations and agreements with other countries). Agricultural policy can also touch on food quality, ensuring that the food supply is of a consistent and known quality, food security, ensuring that the food supply meets the population's needs, and conservation. Policy programs can range from financial programs, such as subsidies, to encouraging producers to enroll in voluntary quality assurance programs.

A 2021 report finds that globally, support to agricultural producers accounts for almost US$540 billion a year. This amounts to 15 percent of total agricultural production value, and is heavily biased towards measures that are leading to inefficiency, as well as are unequally distributed and harmful for the environment and human health. Crop use in animal agriculture accounts for one form of inefficiency. Animal agriculture's estimated land use to produce one kilocalorie or gram of protein is 50 to 100 times that of plant-based alternatives. Furthermore, the larger the livestock, the lower the energy efficiency (kilocalories obtained relative to kilocalories the animal consumes). For instance, beef's energy efficiency is estimated to be 2%.

=== Lobbying ===
Agribusiness, environmental groups, agricultural labor unions and organizations representing individual agricultural commodities tend to engage in agricultural lobbying. Agricultural lobbying can result in higher immigration than the preference of the median voter. The Food and Agriculture Organization of the United Nations (FAO) leads international efforts to defeat hunger and provides a forum for the negotiation of global agricultural regulations and agreements. Samuel Jutzi, director of FAO's animal production and health division, states that lobbying by large corporations has stopped reforms that would improve human health and the environment. For example, proposals in 2010 for a voluntary code of conduct for the livestock industry that would have provided incentives for improving standards for health, and environmental regulations, such as the number of animals an area of land can support without long-term damage, were successfully defeated due to large food company pressure.

== See also ==
- Aeroponics
- Agricultural aircraft
- Agricultural engineering
- Agricultural finance
- Agricultural robot
- Agroecology
- Agrominerals
- Building-integrated agriculture
- Contract farming
- Corporate farming
- Crofting
- Ecoagriculture
- Farmworker
- Food loss and waste
- Food security
- Hill farming
- List of documentary films about agriculture
- Pharming (genetics)
- Remote sensing
- Rural Development
- Soil biodiversity
- Subsistence economy
- Sustainable agriculture
- Urban agriculture
- Vertical farming
- Vegetable farming

== Sources ==
This article incorporates text from a free content work. Licensed under CC BY 4.0 (license statement/permission). Text taken from The State of Food Security and Nutrition in the World 2026, Food and Agriculture Organization of the United Nations.

This article incorporates text from a free content work. Licensed under CC BY 4.0 (license statement/permission). Text taken from The State of Food and Agriculture 2025, Food and Agriculture Organization of the United Nations.

This article incorporates text from a free content work. Licensed under CC BY 4.0 (license statement/permission). Text taken from The State of the World's Land and Water Resources for Food and Agriculture 2025, Food and Agriculture Organization of the United Nations (FAO).

This article incorporates text from a free content work. Licensed under CC BY 4.0 (license statement/permission). Text taken from The Impact of Disasters on Agriculture and Food Security 2025, The Food and Agriculture Organization of the United Nations.

- Acquaah, George (2002). Principles of Crop Production: Theory, Techniques, and Technology. Prentice Hall. ISBN 978-0-13-022133-9.
- Chrispeels, Maarten J.; Sadava, David E. (1994). Plants, Genes, and Agriculture. Boston, Massachusetts: Jones and Bartlett. ISBN 978-0-86720-871-9.
- Needham, Joseph (1986). Science and Civilization in China. Taipei: Caves Books.

This article incorporates text from a free content work. Licensed under CC BY-SA 3.0 IGO (license statement/permission). Text taken from Drowning in Plastics – Marine Litter and Plastic Waste Vital Graphics, United Nations Environment Programme.

This article incorporates text from a free content work (license statement/permission). Text taken from In Brief: The State of Food and Agriculture 2019. Moving forward on food loss and waste reduction, FAO.

This article incorporates text from a free content work (license statement/permission). Text taken from In Brief to The State of Food Security and Nutrition in the World 2022. Repurposing food and agricultural policies to make healthy diets more affordable, FAO.

This article incorporates text from a free content work (license statement/permission). Text taken from In Brief: The State of Food and Agriculture 2018. Migration, agriculture and rural development, FAO.

This article incorporates text from a free content work (license statement/permission). Text taken from In Brief to The State of Food and Agriculture 2022. Leveraging automation in agriculture for transforming agrifood systems, FAO.

This article incorporates text from a free content work (license statement/permission). Text taken from Enabling inclusive agricultural automation, FAO.

This article incorporates text from a free content work. Licensed under CC BY-SA 3.0 (license statement/permission). Text taken from The status of women in agrifood systems – Overview, FAO.

This article incorporates text from a free content work. Licensed under CC BY-SA IGO 3.0 (license statement/permission). Text taken from World Food and Agriculture – Statistical Yearbook 2023, FAO.

This article incorporates text from a free content work. Licensed under CC BY 4.0 (license statement/permission). Text taken from World Intellectual Property Report 2024 - The importance of local capabilities in AgTech specialization, WIPO.
