= Food quality =

Complex measure that rates specific instances of food

Food quality is a concept often based on the organoleptic characteristics (e.g., taste, aroma, appearance) and nutritional value of food. Producers reducing potential pathogens and other hazards through food safety practices is another important factor in gauging standards. A food's origin, and even its branding, can play a role in how consumers perceive the quality of products. Consumer acceptability of foods is typically based upon flavor and texture, as well as its color and smell.

== Safety ==
The International Organization for Standardization identifies requirements for a producer's food safety management system, including the processes and procedures a company must follow to control hazards and promote safe products, through ISO 22000. Federal and state level departments, specifically The Food and Drug Administration, are responsible for promoting public health by, among other things, ensuring food safety. Food quality in the United States is enforced by the Food Safety Act 1990. The European Food Safety Authority provides scientific advice and communicates on risks associated with the food chain on the continent.

There are many existing international quality institutes testing food products in order to indicate to all consumers which are higher quality products. Founded in 1961 in Brussels, The international Monde Selection quality award is the oldest in evaluating food quality. The judgements are based on the following areas: taste, health, convenience, labelling, packaging, environmental friendliness and innovation. As many consumers rely on manufacturing and processing standards, the Institute Monde Selection takes into account the European Food Law.

Food quality in the United States is enforced by the Food Safety Act 1990. Members of the public complain to trading standards professionals, [specify] who submit complaint samples and also samples used to routinely monitor the food marketplace to public analysts. Public analysts carry out scientific analysis on the samples to determine whether the quality is of sufficient standard. It is an important food manufacturing requirement because food consumers are susceptible to any form of contamination that may occur during the manufacturing process.

Food quality also deals with product traceability, (e.g., of ingredient, and packaging suppliers), should a recall of the product be required. It also deals with labeling issues to ensure there is correct ingredient and nutritional information. It is an important food manufacturing requirement, because food consumers are susceptible to any form of contamination that may occur during the manufacturing process. There are also sanitation requirements because it is important to ensure that the food processing environment is as clean as possible in order to produce the safest possible food for the consumer.

== Origin ==
Environmentally sustainable practices, animal welfare, and authenticity play a subjective role when considering the quality of food.

Many consumers also rely on manufacturing and processing standards, particularly to know what ingredients are present, due to dietary, nutritional requirements (kosher, halal, vegetarian), or medical conditions (e.g., diabetes, or allergies).

== Food labeling ==
General food labeling is required by law to be present on food packages. Food containers and packages should be labeled on the front label panels or the principal display panel (PDP).

The Food Allergen Labeling and Consumer Protection Act of 2004 covers the eight food groups that qualify as "major food allergens": milk, eggs, fish, crustacean shellfish, tree nuts, wheat, peanuts, and soybeans.

The United States Department of Agriculture requires food labels to ensure the quality of food products sold. There are different types of food labeling guidelines depending on the type of food group, this includes: dairy, beef, poultry, eggs, USDA Certified Organic, Plant Variety Protection, fruits, vegetables, and specialty crops. Grade shields, official seals and labels are all granted to products that have completed review through USDA’s Agricultural Marketing Service as well as following required labeling guidelines. To consumers and buyers, these shields, seals, and labels ensure the quality and integrity of products.

In Sweden, food labeling is regulated by the Swedish National Food Agency (Livsmedelsverket) and follows the guidelines set by the European Union. The EU's primary regulation on food labeling is Regulation (EU) No 1169/2011 on the provision of food information to consumers.

== Academic resources ==
- Food Quality and Preference
- Journal of Food Quality
- Sensing and Instrumentation for Food Quality and Safety, ISSN 1932-7587, ISSN 1932-9954

== See also ==
- Adulterated food
- Food Administration
- SPE Certified

== Bibliography ==
- Potter, Norman N. and Joseph H. Hotchkiss (1995). Food Science. 5th Edition. New York: Chapman & Hall. pp. 90–112.
