= Agriculture in ants =

Cultivation by ants of plants and animals to provide useful products

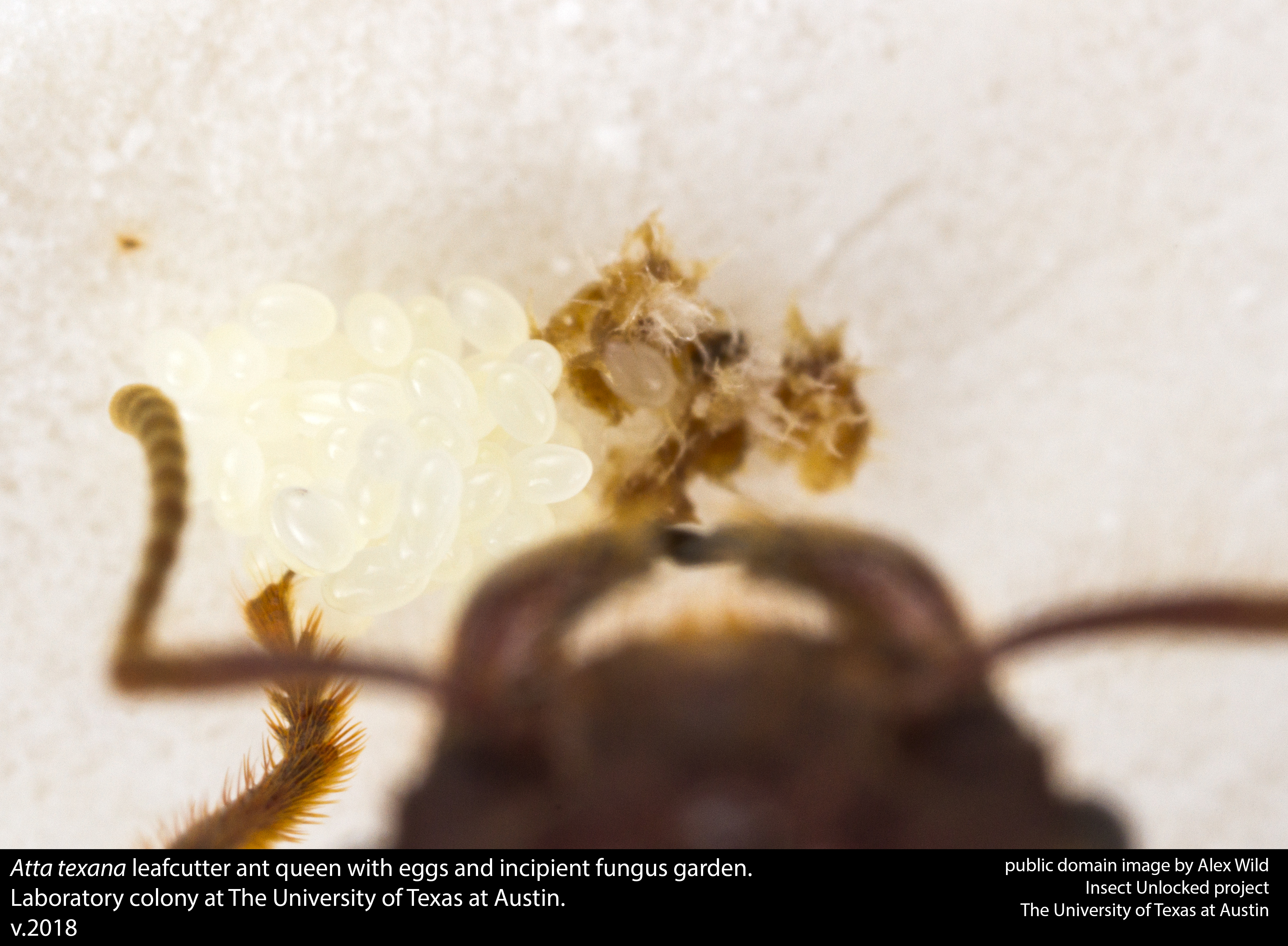
Atta texana queens carry hyphal strands between nests to continue cultivation

Agriculture and domestication are practices undertaken by certain ant species and colonies. These ants use agricultural methods and are known as one of the few animal groups, along with Homo sapiens, to have practiced agriculture. It is estimated that ants began this practice at least 50 million years ago. The domestication of plant, fungus, and animal species by ants is well documented. For some ant species or groups, this is an activity essential to their survival, particularly in a symbiotic relationship with the cultivated species, especially plants or fungi. Some plants require the presence of ants for their survival and offer benefits to the ants in return, creating a mutualistic relationship between their species. The agricultural practices of ants vary widely from one species to another, but they can engage in creating compost necessary for plant growth, fighting pathogens that affect cultivated species, destroying invasive species that threaten their crops, creating "ant gardens" of up to fifty different plants, optimizing crops by adapting to the solar cycle and other natural cycles, or generally engaging in grooming activities. In some cases, it is believed that ants can achieve productivity levels similar to the early stages of human agriculture. Ants also domesticate numerous animal species, especially aphids and Lepidoptera. Plant farming by ants, discovered only in 2016, is a rapidly evolving field of discoveries.

As of 2022, it is estimated that ants assist in the dispersal of seeds for over 11,000 plant species, are in mutualistic relationships with at least 700 plant species, and engage in purely agricultural processes with hundreds of others. Regarding domesticated animals, more than 1,000 of the 4,000 known species of aphids and around 500 species of Lepidoptera are affected by ant domestication.

== Terminology ==
The use of the term "agriculture", which may not be entirely appropriate for mutualistic relationships—particularly in cases where a colony is hosted by a plant, such as a tree, in exchange for protection and aid in its survival and growth—is well documented in the scientific literature for processes where ants create crops and directly cultivate plants or fungi. The use of the term "domestication" is also well established when ant domestication has led to specific evolutionary changes in the species involved.

== Causes and prevalence ==
=== Causes ===
It remains difficult to determine the causes that led different ant species to adopt these behaviors over millions of years of evolution, due to the vast diversity of behaviors depending on the location, the plants, fungi, and animals involved, as well as the great diversity of ant species. However, numerous studies focus particularly on these evolutionary developments, especially in a comparative framework with the human species, to identify commonalities and differences between the two processes. Overall, it seems that leafcutter ant species that developed agricultural practices involving fungi began doing so at least 65-55 million years ago and may have been the first to have engaged in such behavior, though it's not certain. The common ancestor of these species is dated to -65/-55 million years ago. It seems, according to research dating from 2017, that this change occurred in dry habitats, notably in South America.

=== Prevalence ===
As with the causes that led to such behavioral evolution in certain ants, it remains difficult to assess the overall prevalence of these behaviors. As of 2022, it is estimated that ants assist in the dispersal of seeds for over 11,000 plant species, are in mutualistic relationships with at least 700 plant species, and engage in purely agricultural processes with hundreds of others. Regarding domesticated animals, more than 1,000 of the 4,000 known species of aphids and around 500 species of Lepidoptera are affected by ant domestication. In comparison, Homo sapiens engages in farming and agriculture with '260 plant, 470 animal and 100 mushroom-forming fungal species'. Plant farming by ants was only discovered in 2016, making it a very young and rapidly evolving field of study. However, these phenomena appear to involve hundreds of different ant species out of the approximately 13,000 species discovered to date. In 2022, it was believed that approximately 37 various ant species engaged in true plant cultivation, without considering domestication and fungiculture.

== Processes ==
Ants, depending on the species, engage in a wide range of behaviors and practices. Some species, such as leafcutter ants, form symbiotic relationships with certain fungi. In these cases, the queen of a future colony often carries with her a clone of the fungus from her original colony, which her new colony will cultivate and tend to in order to ensure their survival and food supply. They attack pathogens that affect these fungi, defend them against potential threats, and generally engage in grooming to maintain the health of the fungi. This allowed leafcutter ants to become the dominant herbivore species in South America and made them able to create massive ant colonies, containing millions of workers and thousands of ant rooms. The agricultural practices of ants vary widely from one species to another, but they can engage in creating compost necessary for plant growth, fighting pathogens that affect cultivated species, destroying invasive species that threaten their crops, creating "ant gardens" of up to fifty different plants, optimizing crops by adapting to the solar cycle and other natural cycles, or generally engaging in grooming activities. In some cases, it is believed that ants can achieve productivity levels similar to the early stages of human agriculture. They are also known to have, with Homo Sapiens, and a very few number of other animal groups, managed domestication of other animals, in that case, aphids and Lepidoptera. Some ant species, such as Philidris nagasau, were proven recently to create large plant gardens containing dozens of different plants that they use and tend to. This gave them the ability to develop very large colonies and they enjoy results similar to the beginnings of human agriculture, that humans were able to achieve during the Neolithic period.
