= Spes Bona =

- Location within Gauteng Location within South Africa
- Coordinates: 26.208°S 28.072°E
- Country: South Africa
- Province: Gauteng
- Municipality: City of Johannesburg
- Established: 1896
- Time zone: UTC+2 (SAST)
- Postal code (street): 2094

Spes Bona is a suburb of Johannesburg, South Africa. It is located in Region F of the City of Johannesburg Metropolitan Municipality.

== History ==
Prior to the discovery of gold on the Witwatersrand in 1886, the suburb lay on land on one of the original farms called Doornfontein. The suburbs name is Latin for good hope and was established in 1896, named after the nearby Spes Bona Goldmine.
