= SPE Certified =

Nutritional standard for meals

Photo of the SPE Certified seal on a menu in a restaurant in New York City in 2013

SPE Certification is a foodservice industry standard aimed at enhancing the nutritional quality of meals, without compromising the taste. SPE stands for “Sanitas per Escam” in Latin; its English translation is literally “Health Through Food.” The certification program’s core principles include increasing the consumption of fruits, vegetables, legumes and whole grains, as well as reducing intake of saturated fats, added sugars and salt.

The SPE Certified seal, described by The New York Times as a “squiggly red insignia” is placed on a foodservice establishment’s menu next to a specific dish when the dish has met all the required culinary and nutritional criteria.

SPE was developed as a nutritional and culinary philosophy in Rouge Tomate restaurant, Brussels, in 2001. In 2011 it was molded into a certification program aimed at encouraging other foodservice establishments to cook healthy, sustainably-sourced dishes, retaining focus on the taste of the food.
