= Temple of Spes (Quirinal) =

Ancient temple in Rome

The Temple of Spes was a sanctuary in Ancient Rome dedicated to the goddess Spes. The temple, known only from literary sources, was situated on the Quirinal Hill by the Vicus Longus alongside the temples of Febris and Fortuna.

== See also ==
- List of Ancient Roman temples
