= Mountain yam =

Mountain yam may refer to:

- Chinese yam or Dioscorea polystachya
- Japanese mountain yam, which could refer to Dioscorea japonica, or
  - yamatoimo, which is a cultivar of D. polystachya
