= Utsunoya Pass =

Japanese Mountain Pass

Utsunoya-tōge 宇津ノ谷峠
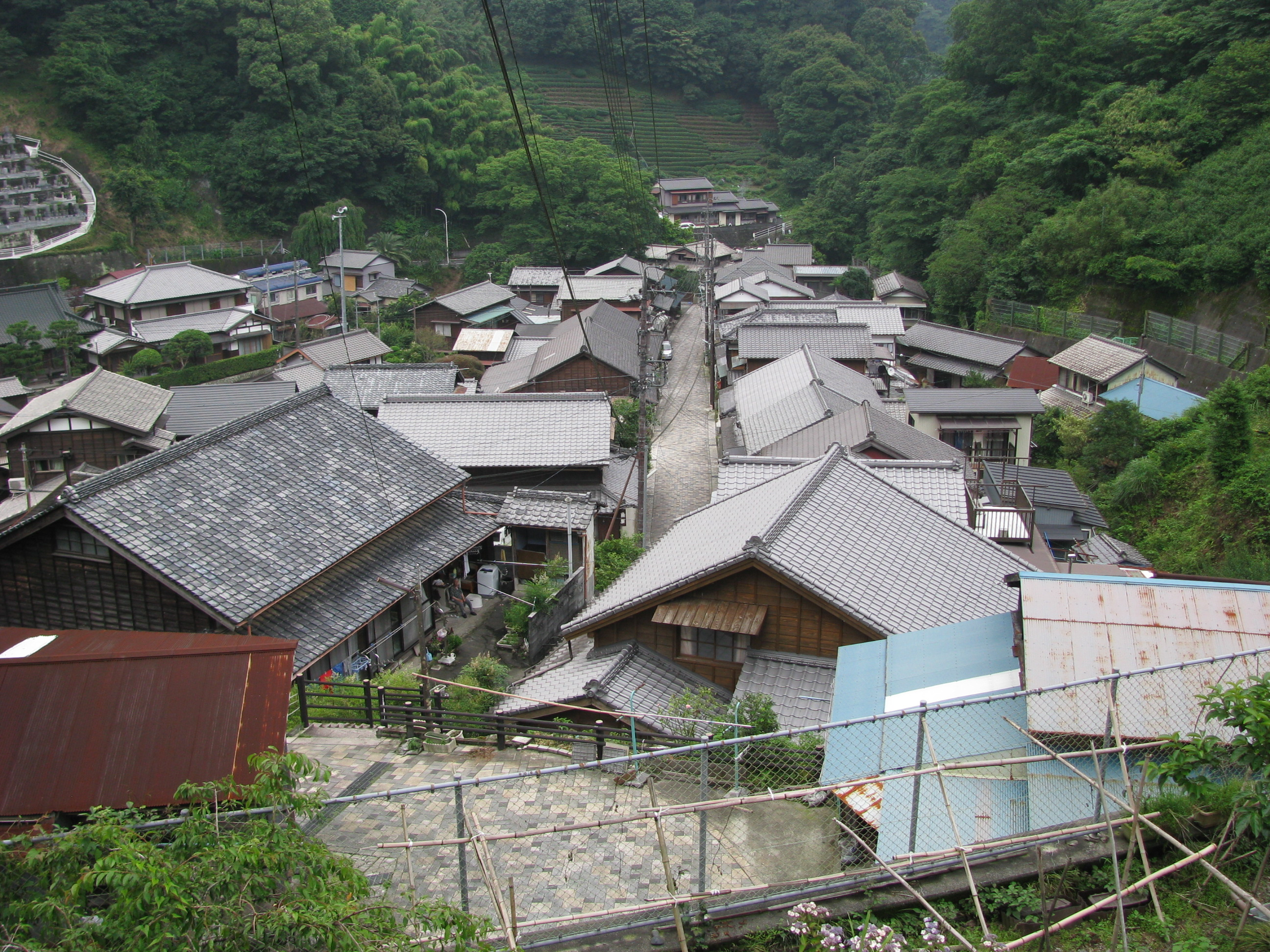
- Village near Utsunoya Pass

- Location within Shizuoka Prefecture Location within Japan
- Elevation: 170 m (560 ft)

Location
- Location: Shizuoka Prefecture, Japan
- Coordinates: 34°56′00″N 138°18′11″E
- National Historic Site of Japan

The Utsunoya-tōge Pass (宇津ノ谷峠, Utsunoya-tōge) is a mountain pass on the old Tōkaidō highway connecting eastern Japan with imperial capital of Kyoto. Located between former Mariko-juku in what is now Suruga-ku, Shizuoka, and Okabe-juku in what is now Fujieda, it is the only portion of the original Heian period road known to have survived to the present day, and a one kilometer stretch of the road was proclaimed a National Historic Site on February 22, 2010.

== Overview ==
The route of the ancient Tōkaidō highway skirted the coast of Suruga Bay during the Nara period. However, due to the rugged coastline in the area, the route was shifted inland to the Utsunoya-tōge during the Heian period. This pass crossed a saddle of a ridge extending from the Akaishi Mountains to Suruga Bay at an elevation of about 170 meters. Mention of the pass is made frequently in Heian-period waka poetry, with references to the narrow road and the sound of Japanese bush warblers in the area. It was known as the “Tsuta no hosomichi” . The route was still in use in 1560, when Imagawa Yoshimoto marched his armies to the disasters Battle of Okehazama. During the 1590 Battle of Odawara, Toyotomi Hideyoshi ordered the route of the Tōkaidō to be shifted slightly, avoiding the pass, to its present course, which offered less of a bottleneck to his armies. The Edo period Tōkaidō followed this new route, and the Heian period pathway was forgotten until rediscovered in 1965.

During the Meiji period, a modern brick tunnel was dug under the Utsunoya-tōge. Completed in 1876, it was the first tunnel in Japan to charge a toll for passage. The tunnel was in use until closed by a fire 1896 but was reopened from 1904 to 1930. Made obsolete by automobiles, the original tunnel was replaced in 1930 by a larger tunnel, and a second tunnel was added in 1959. The 1930 tunnel is used by Shizuoka Prefectural Road 208, and the 1959 tunnel by Japan National Route 1. The original Meiji period tunnel was designated a National Registered Tangible Cultural Property in 1997.

Due to ever increasing traffic, the Heisei Utsunoya-tōge Tunnel was completed in 1990 on the Okabe Bypass of Japan National Route 1.

== Gallery ==
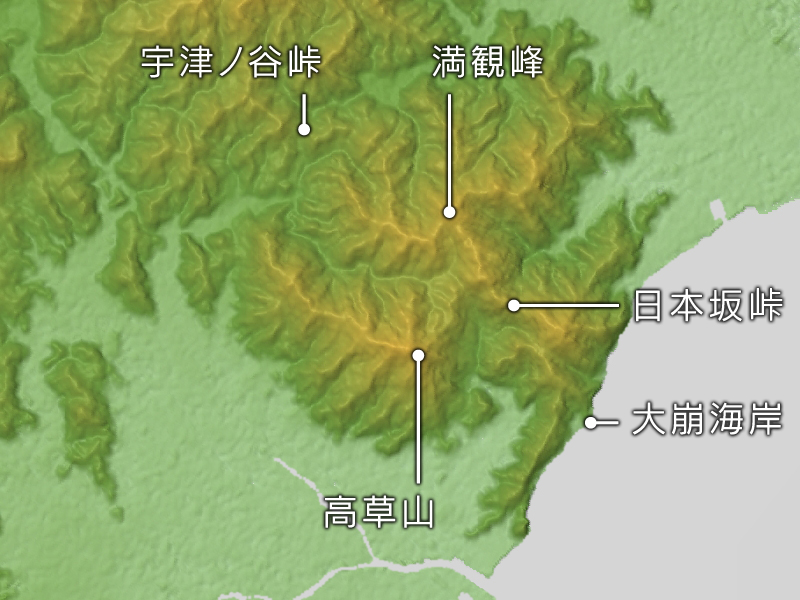
Relief map showing passes in Suruga

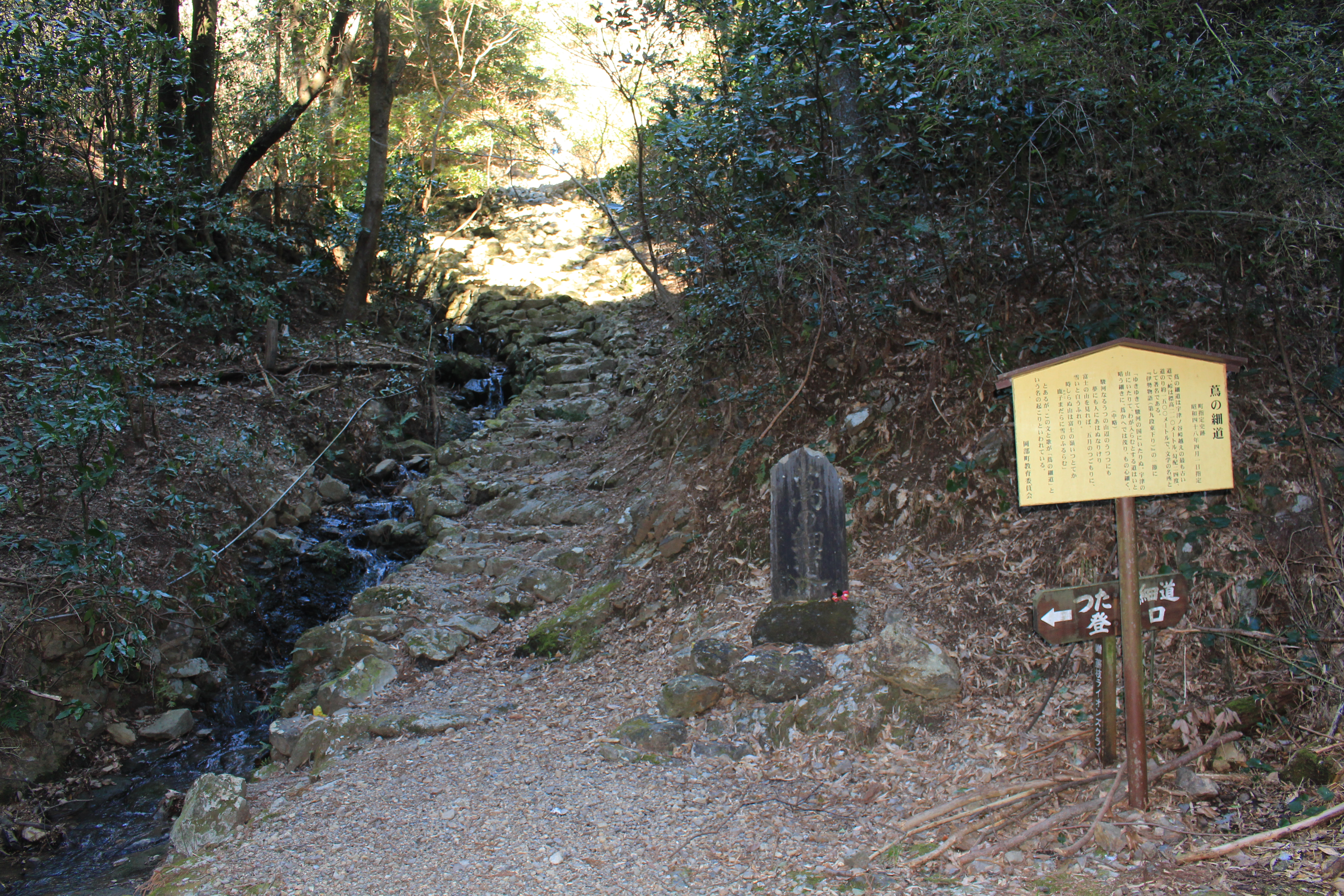
Southern entrance to the pass

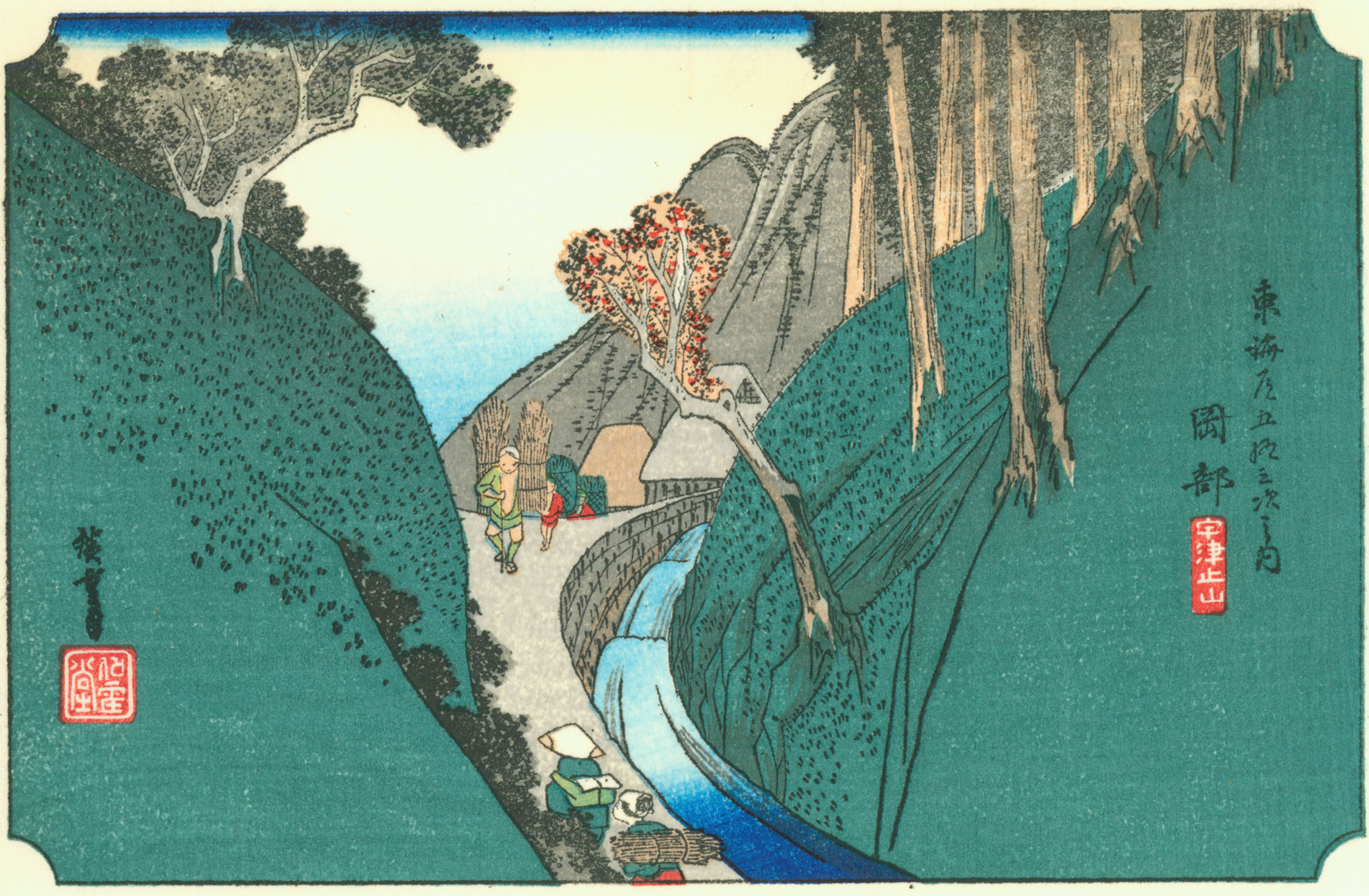
Hiroshige's depiction of the pass

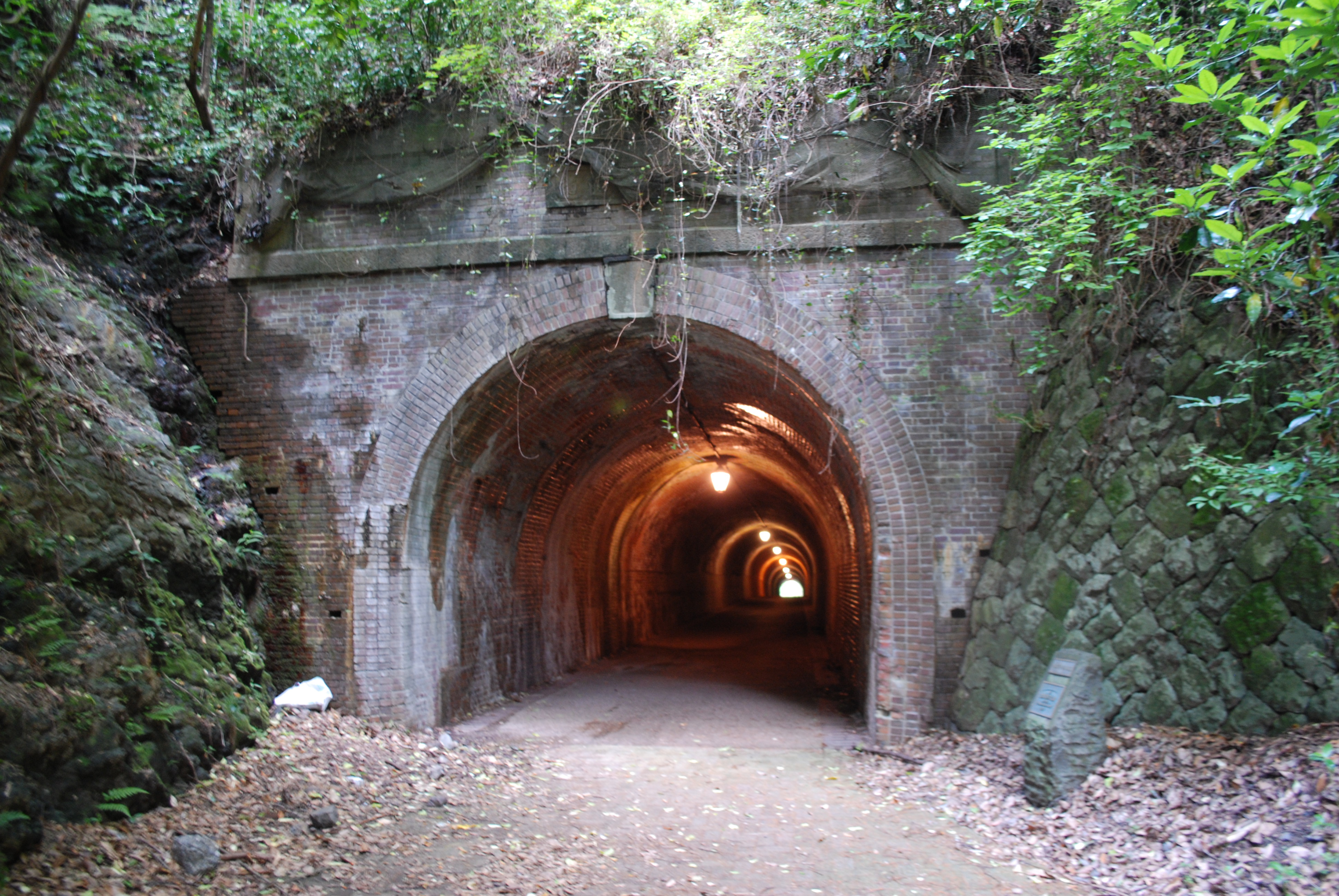
Meiji period Utsunoya-tōge tunnel

== See also ==
- List of Historic Sites of Japan (Shizuoka)
