= Mariko-juku =

Twentieth of the 53 stations of the Tōkaidō in Japan

Coordinates: 34°57′09″N 138°20′41″E

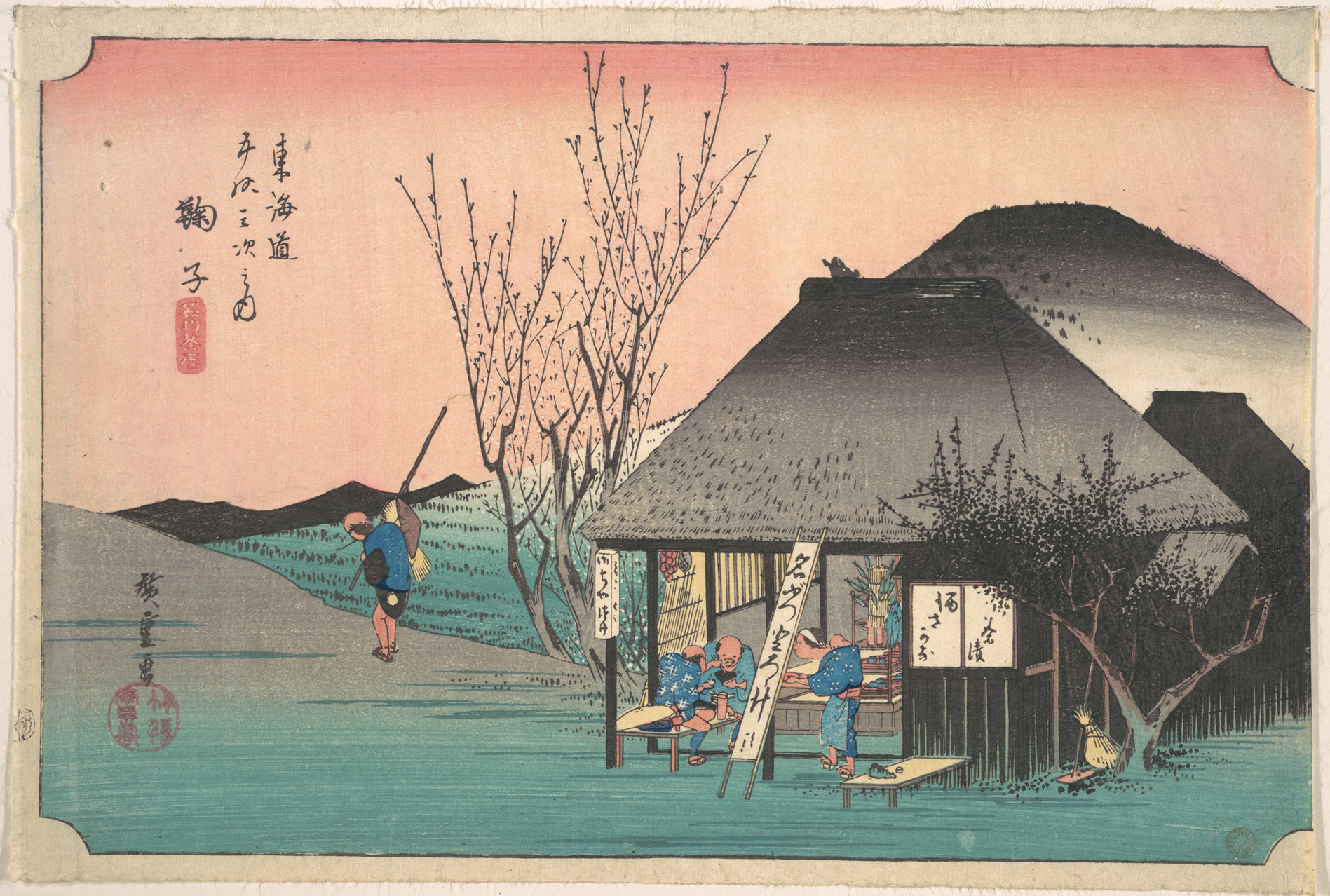
Mariko-juku in the 1830s, as depicted by Hiroshige in The Fifty-three Stations of the Tōkaidō

Mariko-juku (鞠子宿, Mariko-juku) was the twentieth of the fifty-three stations of the Tōkaidō. It is located in what is now part of Suruga Ward in Shizuoka City, Shizuoka Prefecture, Japan. It can also be written as 丸子宿 (Mariko-juku).

== History ==
Mariko-juku was one of the smallest post stations on the Tōkaidō. Old row-houses from the Edo period can be found between Mariko-juku and Okabe-juku, its neighboring post station, in Utsuinotani. This post town also had strong ties to the Minamoto, Imagawa and Tokugawa clans.

The classic ukiyo-e print by Andō Hiroshige (Hōeidō edition) from 1831–1834 depicts two travellers at a wayside restaurant called Chouji-ya(丁子屋), notable for serving tororo-jiru (grated japanese yam soup). The restaurant was founded in 1596 and is still in operation.

== Neighboring post towns ==
Tōkaidō
Fuchū-shuku - Mariko-juku - Okabe-juku
