= Fujieda-juku =

Twenty-second of the 53 stations of the Tōkaidō in Japan

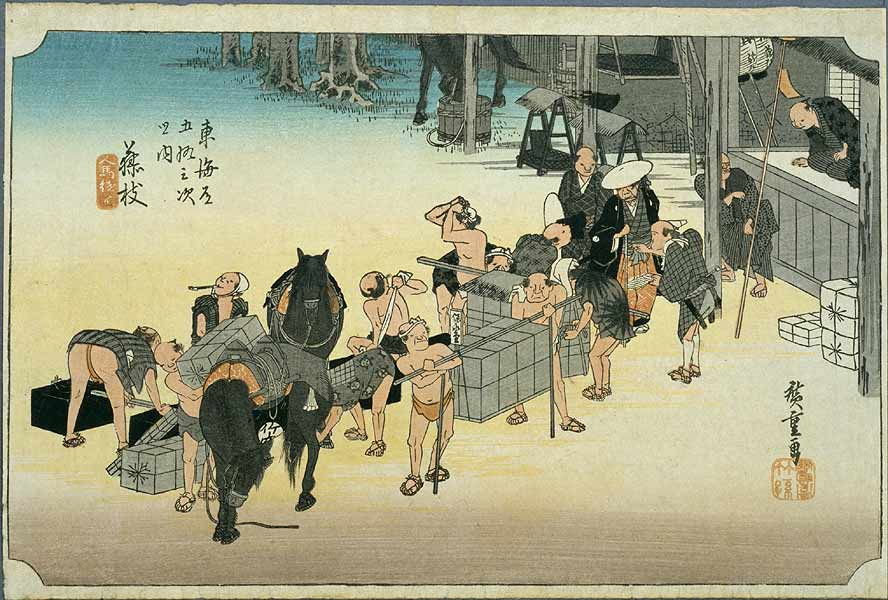
Fujieda-juku in the 1830s, as depicted by Hiroshige in The Fifty-three Stations of the Tōkaidō

Fujieda-juku (藤枝宿, Fujieda-juku) was the twenty-second of the fifty-three stations of the Tōkaidō. It is located in what is now part of the city of Fujieda, Shizuoka Prefecture, Japan.

== History ==
Fujieda-juku was a castle town of the Tanaka Domain. Additionally, it was a post station along the Unuma Kaidō, which ran to the salt-producing area of Sagara. It flourished as a commercial town and, at its prime, hosted 37 hatago.

The classic ukiyo-e print by Andō Hiroshige (Hōeidō edition) from 1831–1834 depicts the actual business of the shukuba as a relay station to change horses and coolies to permit the rapid transmission of high priority messages and goods between Edo and Kyoto.

At the beginning of the Meiji period, when the Tōkaidō Main Line railway was being built, residents were worried about the smoke and ash from the newly developed steam locomotives would ruin their green tea crop, and decided to block construction of the line. As a result, Fujieda Station (now part of Central Japan Railway Company) was built approximately three kilometers from the town, which led to a decline in prosperity for the old town. However, after Fujieda became a city, its area expanded greatly and has become an industrial community. Additionally, it serves as a bedroom community to Shizuoka.

== Neighboring post towns ==
Tōkaidō
Okabe-juku - Fujieda-juku - Shimada-juku
