= Tororo (food) =

Japanese grated yam dish

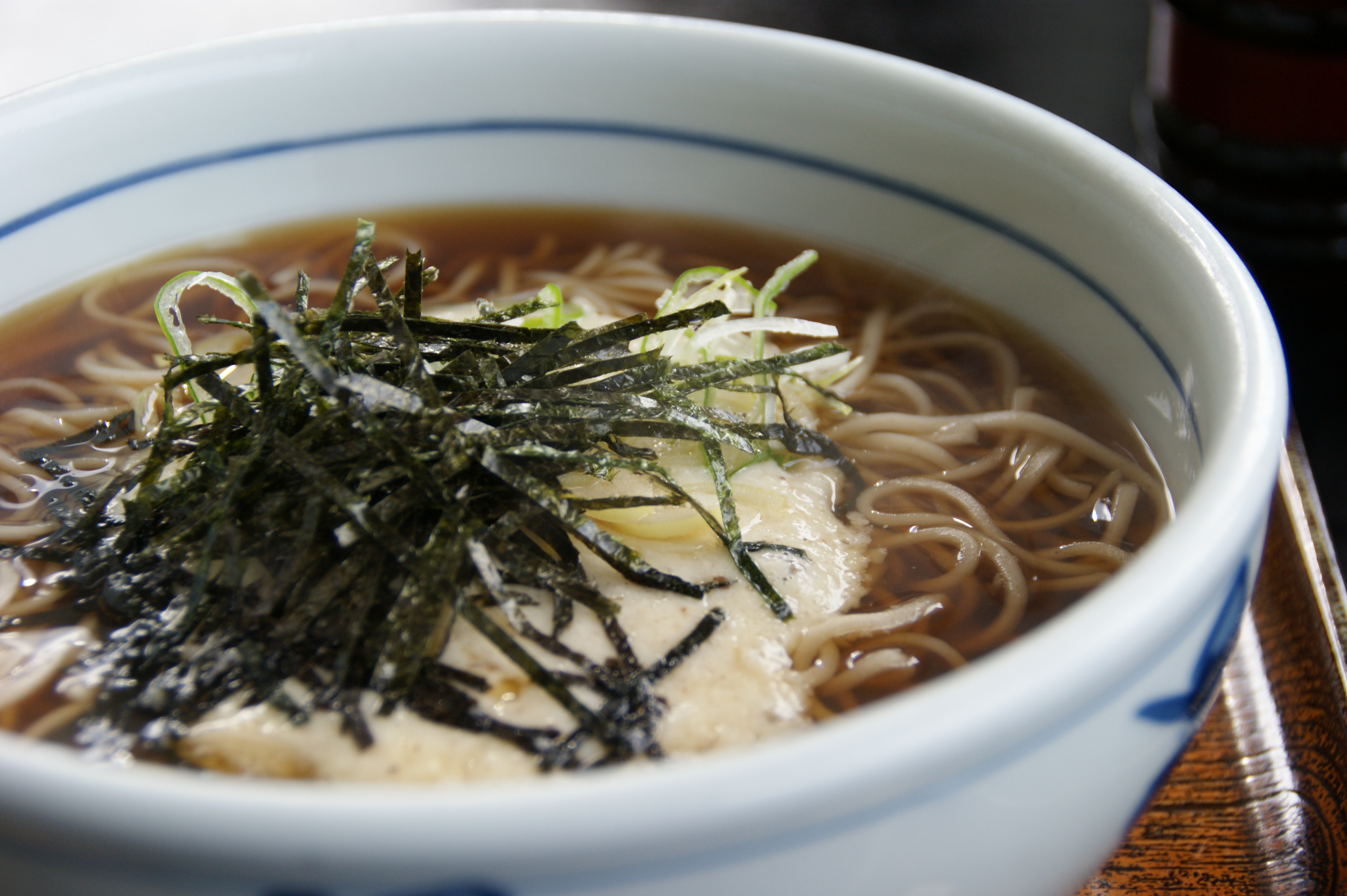
- Soba with tororo
- Type: Side dish, food staple
- Place of origin: Japan
- Associated cuisine: Japanese cuisine
- Serving temperature: Cold
- Main ingredients: Yamaimo or nagaimo, water

Tororo (Japanese: 薯蕷, とろろ) is a Japanese side dish made from grating raw yams such as yamaimo (Japanese mountain yam) or nagaimo (Chinese yam).

The flavorless dish uses ingredients such as wasabi (a pungent paste made from the wasabi plant), dashi (Japanese stocks), and chopped spring onions, to give it more flavor. It has a white and sticky texture and is also served as an ingredient in various dishes, such as being paired with various types of noodles, such as soba (Japanese buckwheat noodles) and udon (wheat flour noodles).

Its ubiquity in various dishes makes it a staple of Japanese cuisine and culture, being featured in many literary and art works made by people such as poet Matsuo Basho, artist Hiroshige, and Edo period priest Anrakuan Sakuden.

== Etymology ==
The term tororo (とろろ), comes from the Japanese sound symbolism of torotoro (トロトロ or とろとろ), which expresses that something is sticky, slimy, or syrupy.

In Japanese grammar, onomatopoeias usually function as adverbs, though they can also function as verbs with the auxiliary verb suru (する, "do"); with torotorosuru (とろとろする or トロトロする), meaning the state of a solid object turning into a viscous liquid.

== Production ==
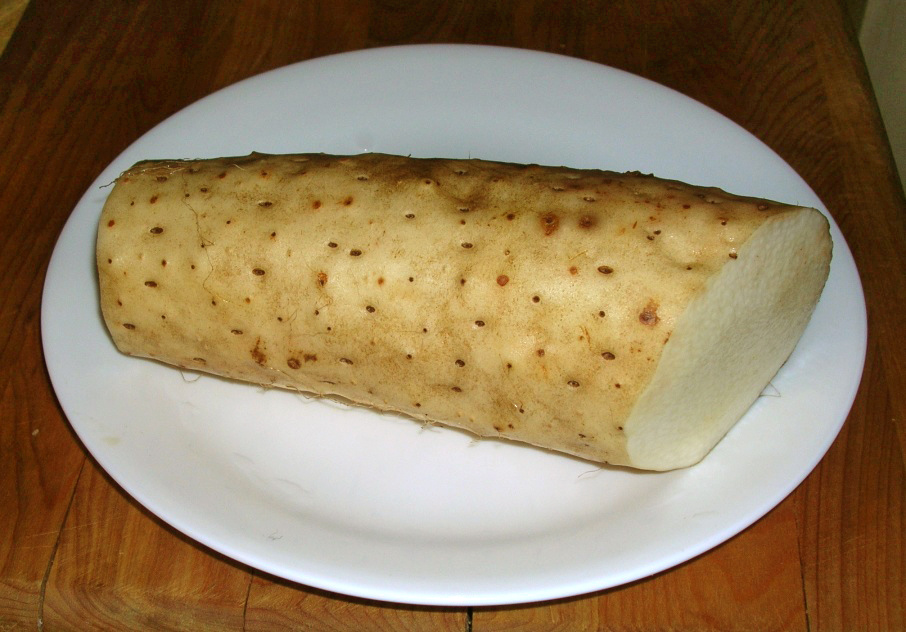
Nagaimo (literally "long tuber"), also known as Chinese yam, a yam used for making tororo

Tororo is usually made from raw yam of either of two species, namely yamaimo (Dioscorea japonica) and/or nagaimo (Dioscorea polystachya).

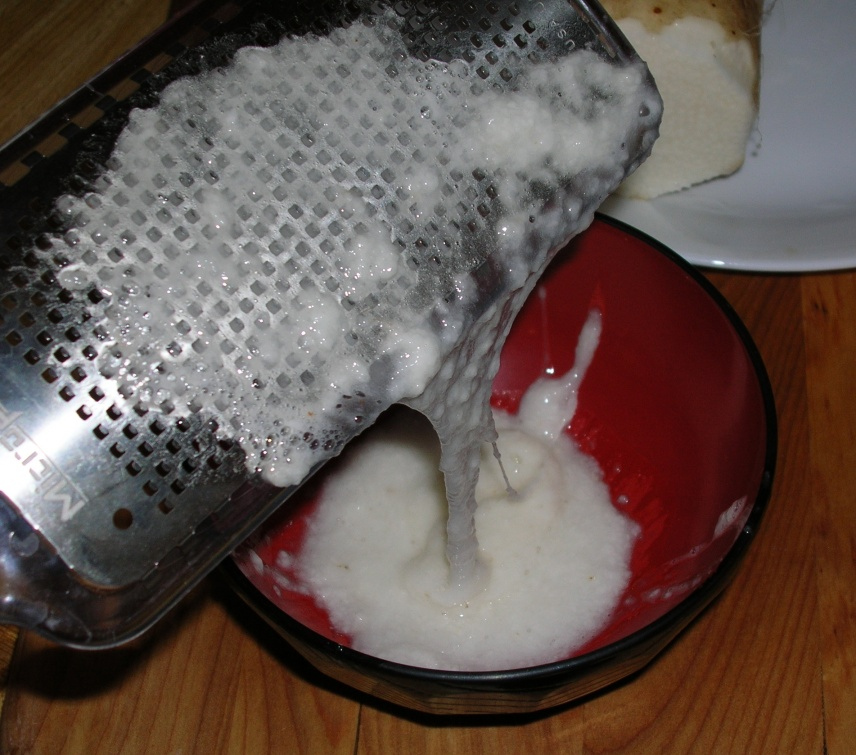
Grated tororo using a modern grater

Before grating, the yam's roots and the peel are removed to avoid itchiness from the calcium oxalate crystals present on those parts of the plant. Even though they possess these crystals, they are not present on the pith, unlike other tubers.

Traditional grating uses a suribachi, a traditional pottery bowl similar to a mortar, grinding the yam along the surface of it slowly until the amount of yam present on it is enough so that a surikogi, a traditional pestle, can mix it by lifting it to incorporate air for a more viscous texture. Many modern processes of making tororo use a grater for a faster process.

Tororo is usually plain, but other ingredients such as soy sauce, dashi, and miso (soybean paste), are added for other recipes such as mugitoro (tororo over rice) and suitoro (clear soup) to enhance the flavor and change the texture.

== Texture ==
The stickiness of tororo gets prevalent during grinding, which is said to be the mucilage found in the yam dissolving the cells by grinding and hydrating them. Another theory suggests that grinding the yam makes it stickier, which also happens when the grinded-up yam is cooked. The chemical composition of the mucilage has not yet been found. Theories from the Chemical Society of Japan suggest that the substance is made of mannans and proteins, which have the same characteristics when Ginkgo biloba is ground.

== Nutrition ==
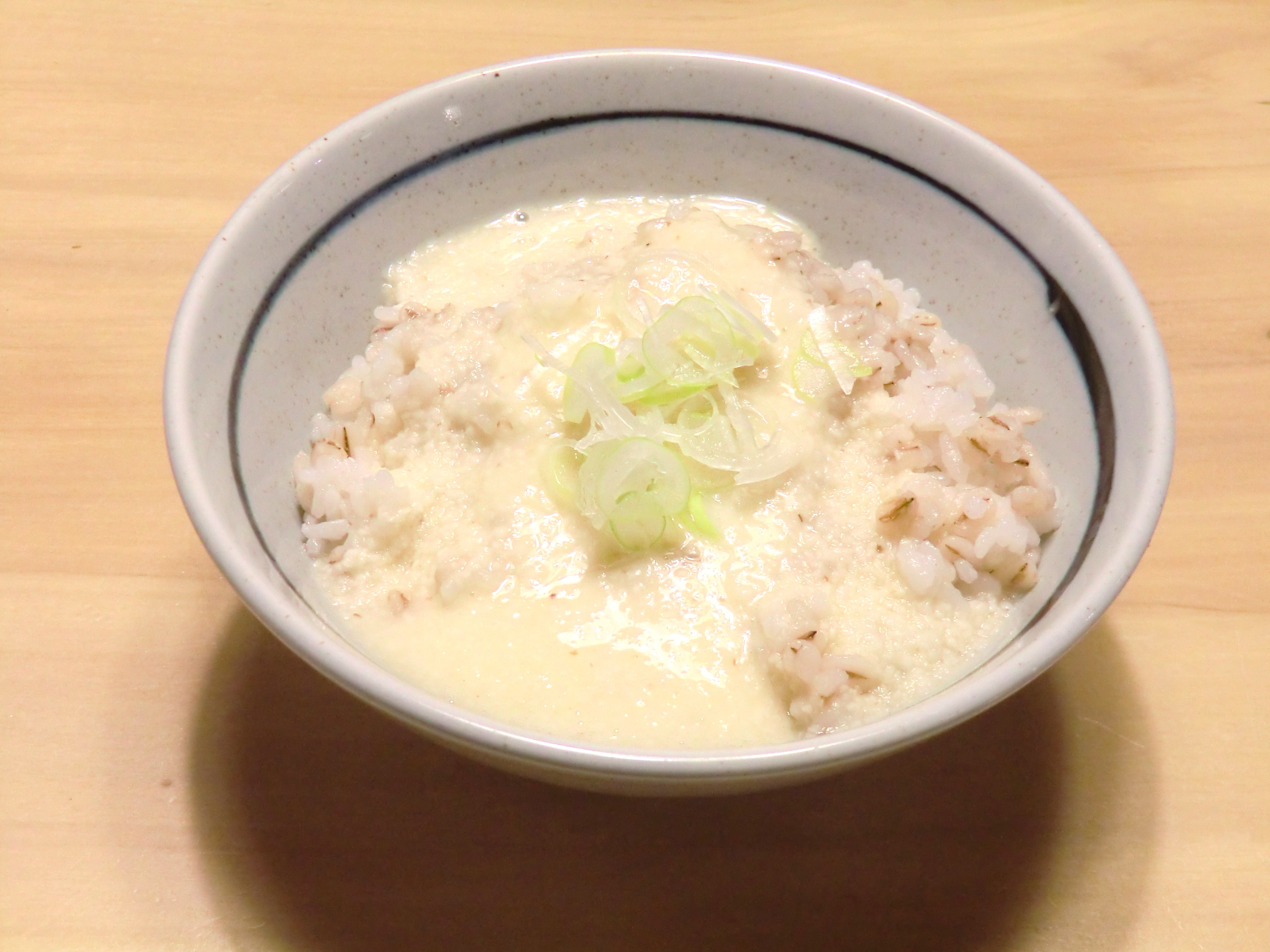
Mugitoro gohan (tororo over rice), a dish used in the study

The main ingredient of tororo (yams) contains a high amount of vitamins and minerals such as thiamine (vitamin B1), vitamin C, calcium, and potassium, as well as micronutrients such as potassium, zinc, and iron.

In a study by the Asia Pacific Journal of Clinical Nutrition, the consumption of tororo lowers blood sugar and insulin. Due to the raw nature of the food, it is more difficult to digest due to the presence of mucin, dietary fiber, and uncooked raw starch in tororo.

== Uses in food ==
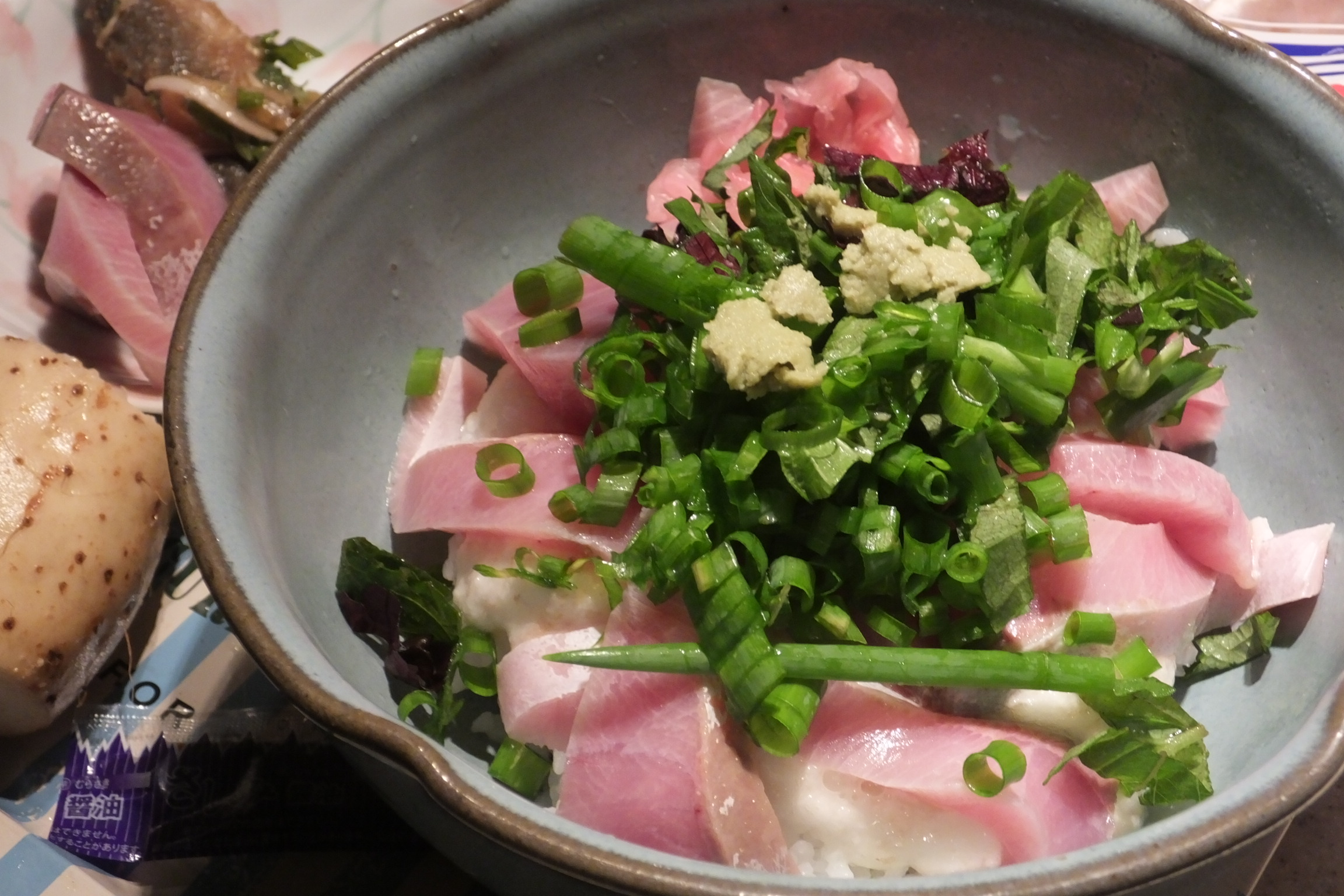
Yamakake, hamachi (yellowtail) over tororo

Tororo is served cold and is consumed on its own, but can also be used as a side dish for other dishes or as an ingredient to other dishes. It is usually flavorless but other condiments such as wasabi, dashi, miso, and chopped spring onions are added for flavor or for other dishes.

Tororo is often used as an inexpensive topping on many dishes such as nattō (fermented soybeans), udon, and fish. When tororo is accompanied with diced fish (usually tuna), the dish is called yamakake. Yamakake can also be used when referring to soba topped off with tororo.

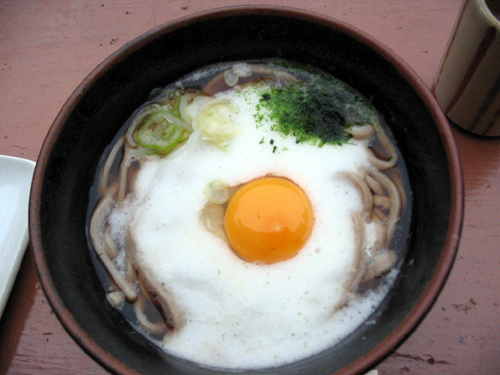
Soba with tororo

One of these foods is called mugitoro gohan (tororo over rice) (also known as tororo-meshi and tororo-kake-meshi when made), a dish made by pouring tororo over barley rice.

Many soups, such as soba noodle soups, are paired with tororo. Tororo is mixed up with ingredients such as soy sauce, miso, and dashi before being put as an ingredient in a soup called tororo-jiru (tororo soup) to add more flavor. Mugitoro gohan is often paired up with soup, with the combination being called kotozute-jiru.

== Depictions in art and literature ==
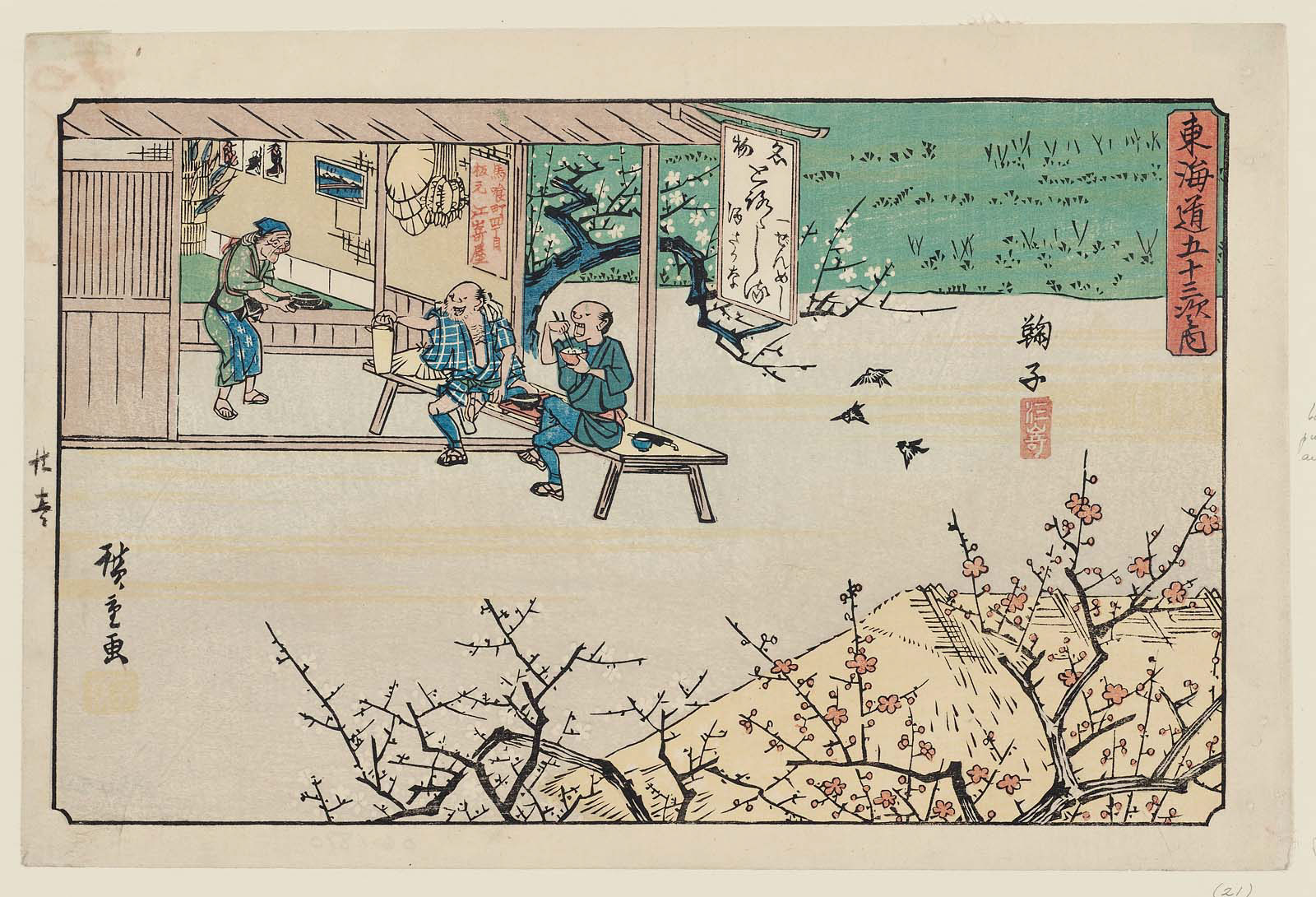
Tororo-jiru depicted in an ukiyo-e of Mariko-juku, one of the stations in the 53 Stations of the Tōkaidō

Tororo is referenced in literary works such as the Seisuishō, a book made by Edo period priest Anrakuan Sakuden in 1623, coining the term kotozute-jiru (literally meaning word soup), from the double meaning of the word iiyaru, which can mean to say (using words) or to eat.

In the Edo period, Mariko-juku, one of the stations in the 53 Stations of the Tōkaidō, tororo-jiru is known as a famous local food in the area. Poet Matsuo Bashō, wrote a poem about the local specialty entitled Ume-wakana Maruko no Yado no Tororo-Jiru in his anthology Sarumino. It is written as a specialty of the area in the Tōkaidōchū Hizakurige, a comic picaresque novel composed by writer Jippensha Ikku.

Featured on the ukiyo-e prints by artist Hiroshige, The Fifty-three Stations of the Tōkaidō, one print features Mariko-juku, the 20th station of the Tōkaidō, of a teahouse serving tororo-jiru.
