= Okabe-juku =

Twenty-first of the 53 stations of the Tōkaidō in Japan

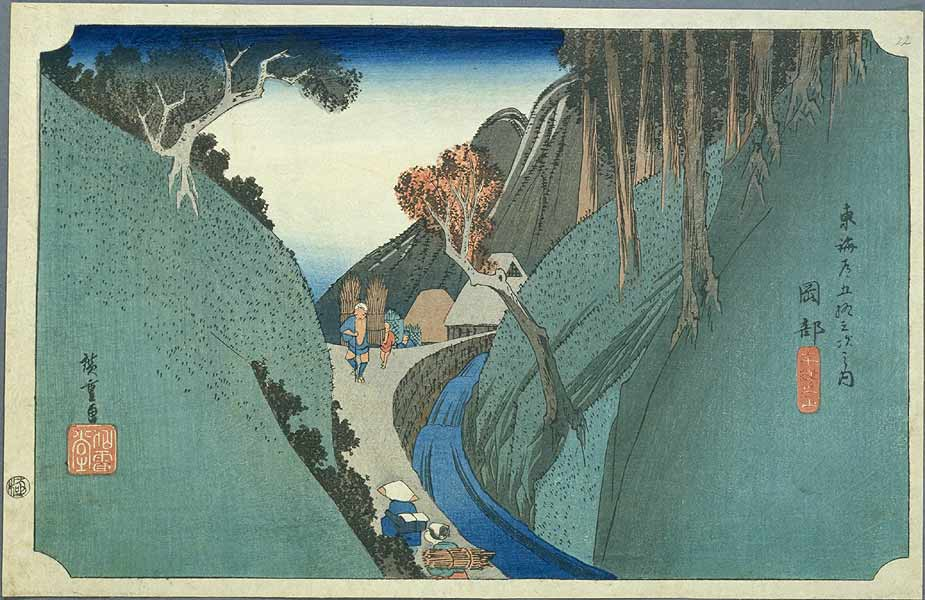
Okabe-juku in the 1830s, as depicted by Hiroshige in The Fifty-three Stations of the Tōkaidō

Okabe-juku (岡部宿, Okabe-juku) was the twenty-first of the fifty-three stations of the Tōkaidō. It is located in what is now the city of Fujieda, Shizuoka Prefecture, Japan. Between Okabe-juku and the preceding post station of Mariko-juku runs Route 1, which was part of the ancient trade route.

== History ==
Though most post stations along the Tōkaidō were built the first year the route was established; however, Okabe-juku was built one year later in 1602. It only had a population of 16 when it was first established and even by 1638], there were only 100 people in the town, making it a rather small post town; however, it was still able to flourish.

The classic ukiyo-e print by Andō Hiroshige (Hōeidō edition) from 1831–1834 depicts a mountain stream between steep green banks, with the roadway a narrow path walled in on one side by a stone wall.

Okabe-juku's hatago, Kashiba-ya, prospered during the Edo period; however, it was destroyed by fire in 1834. After it was rebuilt in 1836, it was eventually named nationally designated Important Cultural Property. In 2000, it was reopened as an archives museum.

== Neighboring post towns ==
Tōkaidō
Mariko-juku - Okabe-juku - Fujieda-juku
