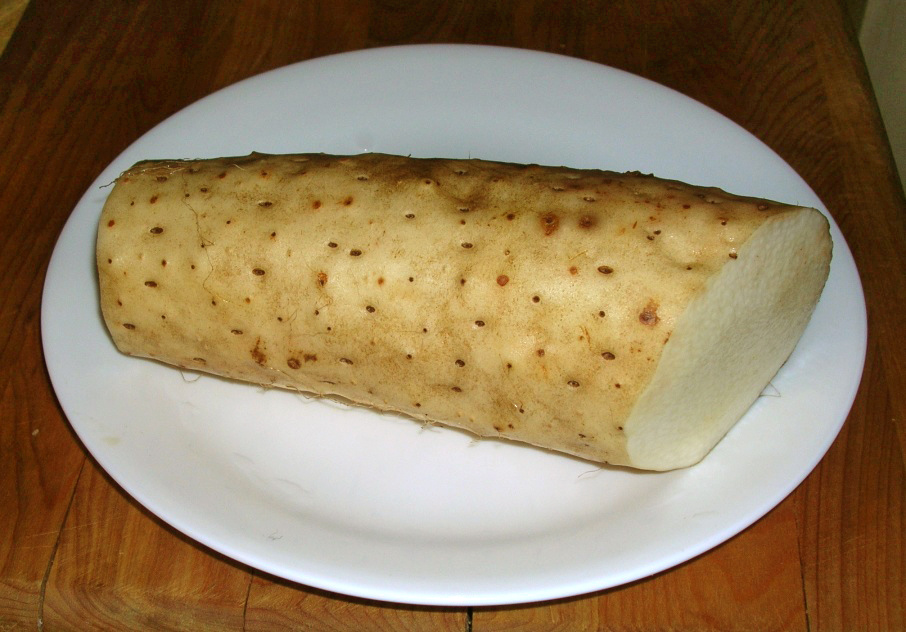

Scientific classification
- Kingdom: Plantae
- Clade: Tracheophytes
- Clade: Angiosperms
- Clade: Monocots
- Order: Dioscoreales
- Family: Dioscoreaceae
- Genus: Dioscorea
- Species: D. polystachya

Binomial name
- Dioscorea polystachya Turcz.

Synonyms
- Dioscorea batatas Decne.; Dioscorea decaisneana Carrière; Dioscorea doryphora Hance; Dioscorea swinhoei Rolfe; Dioscorea rosthornii Diels; Dioscorea potaninii Prain & Burkill; Dioscorea pseudobatatas (Hauman) Herter

= Chinese yam =

Species of yam from East Asia

Dioscorea polystachya or Chinese yam (shānyào, simplified Chinese: 山药; traditional Chinese: 山藥), also called cinnamon-vine, is a species of flowering plant in the yam family. It is sometimes called Chinese potato or by its Korean name ma. It is also called huaishan in Mandarin and wàaih sāan in Cantonese.

It is a perennial climbing vine, native to East Asia. The edible tubers are cultivated largely in East Asia and sometimes used in alternative medicine. This species of yam is unique as the tubers can be eaten raw.

== Range ==
This plant grows throughout East Asia. It is believed to have been introduced to Japan in the 17th century or earlier. Introduced to the United States as early as the 19th century for culinary and cultural uses, it is now considered an invasive plant species. The plant was introduced to Europe in the 19th century during the European Potato Failure, where cultivation continues to this day for the contemporary East Asian food market.

== Taxonomy ==
The botanical names Dioscorea opposita and Dioscorea oppositifolia have been consistently misapplied to Chinese yam. The name D. opposita is now an accepted synonym of D. oppositifolia. Botanical works that point out the error may list, e.g., Dioscorea opposita auct. as a synonym of D. polystachya. Furthermore, neither D. oppositifolia nor the prior D. opposita have been found growing in North America and have no historical range in China or East Asia, since this grouping is exclusively native only to the subcontinent of India and should not be confused with Dioscorea polystachya.

== Description ==
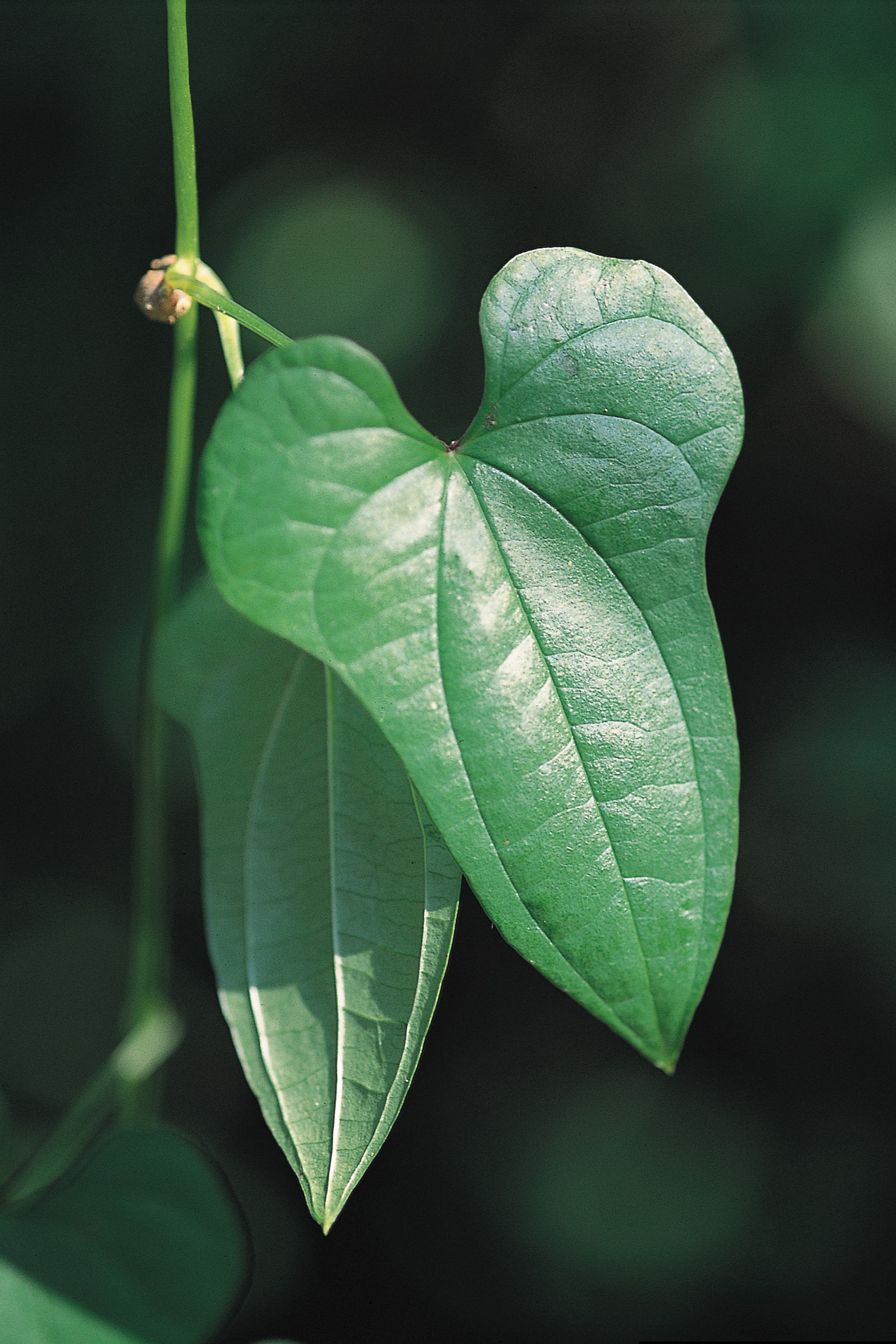
Dioscorea polystachya, Chinese yam

Dioscorea polystachya vines typically grow 3–5 meters (9.8–16.4 ft) long, and can be longer. They twine anticlockwise. The leaves are up to 11 centimeters (4.3 in) long and wide. They are lobed at the base and larger ones may have lobed edges. The arrangement is variable; they may be alternately or oppositely arranged or borne in whorls.

In the leaf axils appear warty rounded bulbils under 2 centimeters (0.79 in) long. The bulbils are sometimes informally referred to as "yam berries" or "yamberries".

New plants sprout from the bulbils or parts of them.

The flowers of Chinese yam are cinnamon-scented.

The plant produces one or more spindle-shaped or cylindrical tubers. The largest may weigh 10 pounds (4.5 kg) and grow one meter (3 ft 3 in) underground. Dioscorea polystachya is more tolerant to frost and cooler climates than other yams, which is attributed to its successful introductions and establishment on many continents.

== Common names ==
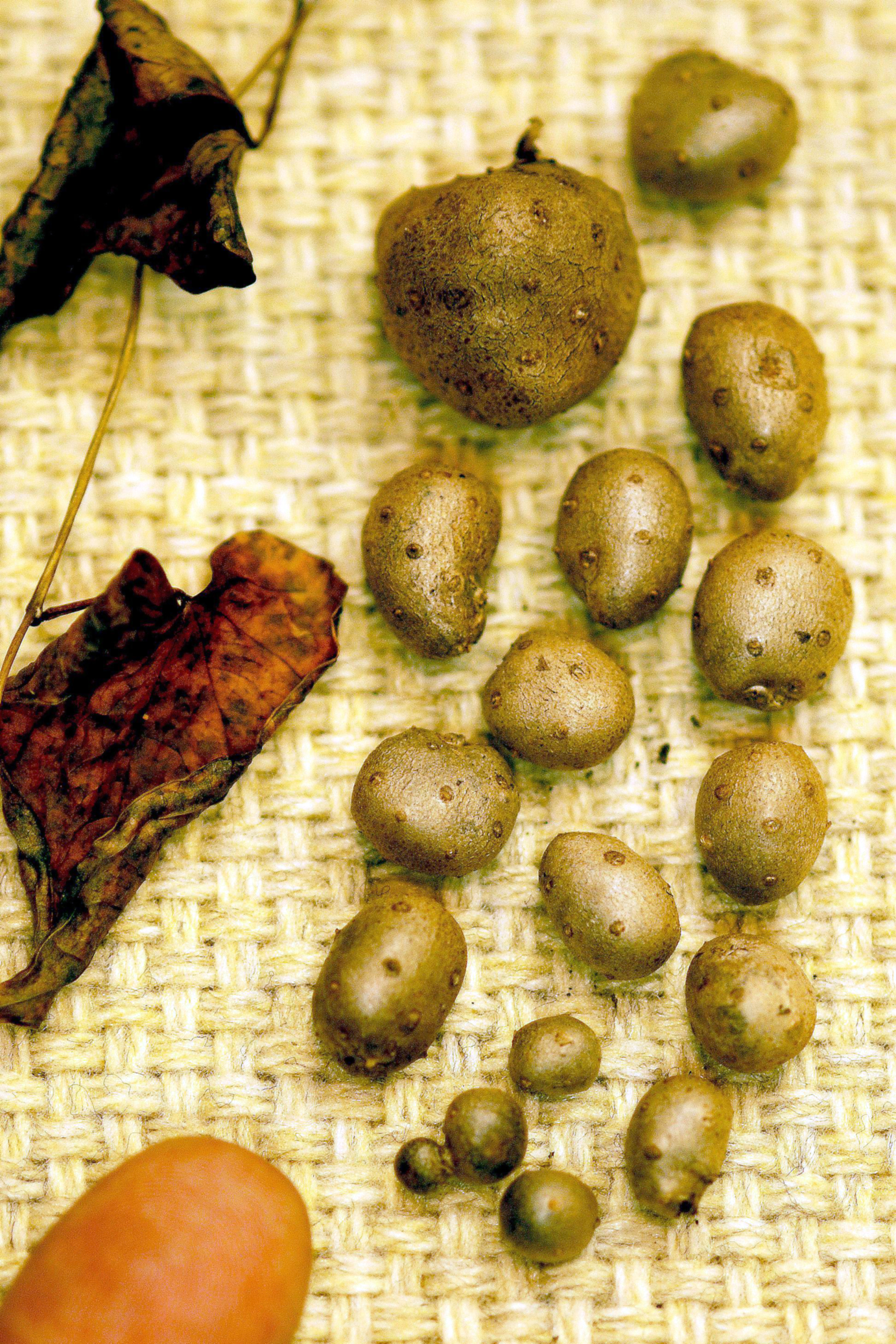
In addition to larger underground tubers, Chinese yam also produces small bulbils (aerial tubers), formed where leaves join the stem. These are also edible but are described as having a bland or unappealing taste. Some compare their taste to that of new potatoes.

In Chinese it is known as shānyào (simplified Chinese: 山药; traditional Chinese: 山藥; lit. 'mountain medicine'), huáishān (怀山; 懷山 or 淮山), or huáishānyào (怀山药; 懷山藥 or 淮山药; 淮山藥; 'mountain medicine from Huai', i.e. the Huai Qing Fu (怀庆俯; 懷慶俯) region). Rarely, it is also referred to as shǔyù (薯蓣; 薯蕷). The yam bulbils are referred to as shanyao dou (山药豆; 山藥豆; 'yam bean') or shanyao dan (山药蛋; 山藥蛋; 'yam eggs').

In Japan, three groups of this species in cultivation are recognized. The common long, cylindrical type is known as nagaimo (長芋; lit. 'long yam'). The ichōimo (銀杏芋; 'ginkgo-leaf yam') bears a flat, palmate shape, and the tsukune imo (つくね芋) 'meatball yam' is round or globular. The term yamatoimo (大和芋; 'Yamato [Province] yam') is used particularly in the Kantō region for the ichōimo in the market, but this is confusing since traditionally yamatoimo has also referred to tsukuneimo, especially if produced in Yamato Province (now Nara Prefecture). Cultivars of this species (such as yamatoimo) is sometimes called "Japanese mountain yam", though that term should properly be reserved for the native Dioscorea japonica.

In Korea it is called ma (Korean: 마), sanu (Korean: 산우; Hanja: 山芋), seoyeo (서여; 薯蕷), or sanyak (산약; 山藥).

In Sri Lanka in Sinhala it is called wal ala (වැල් අල). It is sometimes called Korean yam.

In Vietnam, the yam is called củ mài or khoai mài. When this yam is processed to become a medicine, the yam is called hoài sơn or tỳ giải.

In the Ilocano of the northern Philippines it is called tuge.

In Latin American countries it is known as camote del cerro or white ñame.

In Manipuri it is called as "Ha".

== In alternative medicine ==
Creams and dietary supplements made from the related Dioscorea villosa are claimed to contain human hormones and promoted as a medicine for a variety of purposes, including cancer prevention and the treatment of Crohn's disease and whooping cough. However, according to the American Cancer Society, the claims are false and there is no evidence to support these substances being either safe or effective. Huáishān has also been used in traditional Chinese medicine.

== As an invasive species ==
Dioscorea polystachya was introduced to the United States in the 1800s when it was planted as an ornamental or food crop. It and other introduced yam species now grow wild there. It is troublesome in Great Smoky Mountains National Park, where its range is "rapidly expanding", particularly into the Tennessee Valley where different native, hybrid and/or invasive non-native variants of morning glory and bindweed as well as invasive kudzu and cuscuta (dodder) have all become problematic and are similar in appearance to the fast-moving and often mishandled tubers.

As Chinese yam and air potatoes continue to destroy entire swaths of gardens and yards though are not yet classified as invasive in these areas, residents seeking to eat the tuber plant their vines in unprotected land while residents seeking removal chop the tops off of vines at ground level and compost or mulch them before realizing this only makes the problem worse and that no weed killers on the market are able to rid a garden or yard of the plant. The newest solution from Florida for people in Florida and surrounding states experiencing harm to their property and wishing a reprieve from these plant pests is to request free Air Potato Beetles. However, the beetles continue to elude Tennesseans due to various government regulations and the lack of others. It is most prevalent in moist habitat types. It is more tolerant of frost than other yams and can occur in temperate climates as far north as New York.

== Culinary uses ==
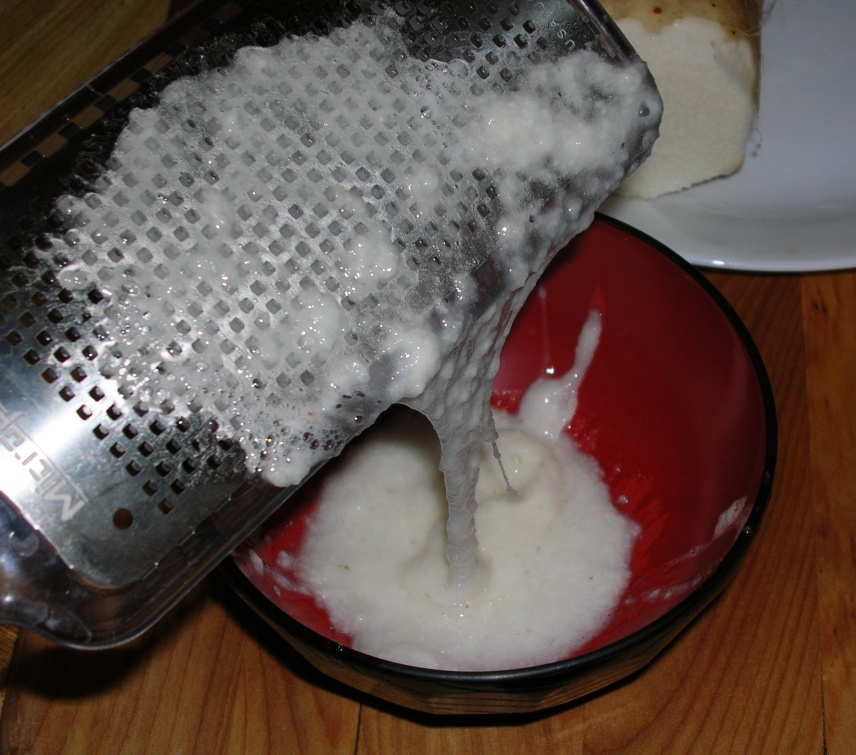
Grated Dioscorea polystachya (Japanese tororo)

The tubers of D. polystachya can be eaten raw (grated or sliced), while most other yams must be cooked before consumption (due to harmful substances in the raw state).

First the skin needs to be removed by peeling (or by scraping off using a hard-bristled brush). This may cause a slight irritation to the hand, and wearing a latex glove is advised, but if an itch develops then lemon juice or vinegar may be applied.

The peeled whole tubers are briefly soaked in a vinegar-water solution, to neutralize irritant oxalate crystals found in their skin, and to prevent discoloration. The raw vegetable is starchy and bland, mucilaginous when cut or grated, and may be eaten plain as a side dish, or added to noodles, etc.

=== East Asian cuisine ===
==== Chinese cuisine ====
Chinese yam is referred to as shānyào (山药; 山藥), or mountain medicine, in Chinese traditional medicine, or referred to as huáishān (怀山; 懷山 or 淮山) in the culinary usage. The tuber is consumed raw, steamed, or deep-fried. It is added to savory soups, or can be sweetened with a berry sauce. When used fresh, the tuber is peeled before slicing and using them in stir-fries (mainly in Cantonese cuisine). Oftentimes, Chinese yam can be found sold in prepared, dried slices in dried goods specialty shops. When using the dry ingredient in soups, the slices need to be soaked before adding them to soups to cook.

==== Japanese cuisine ====
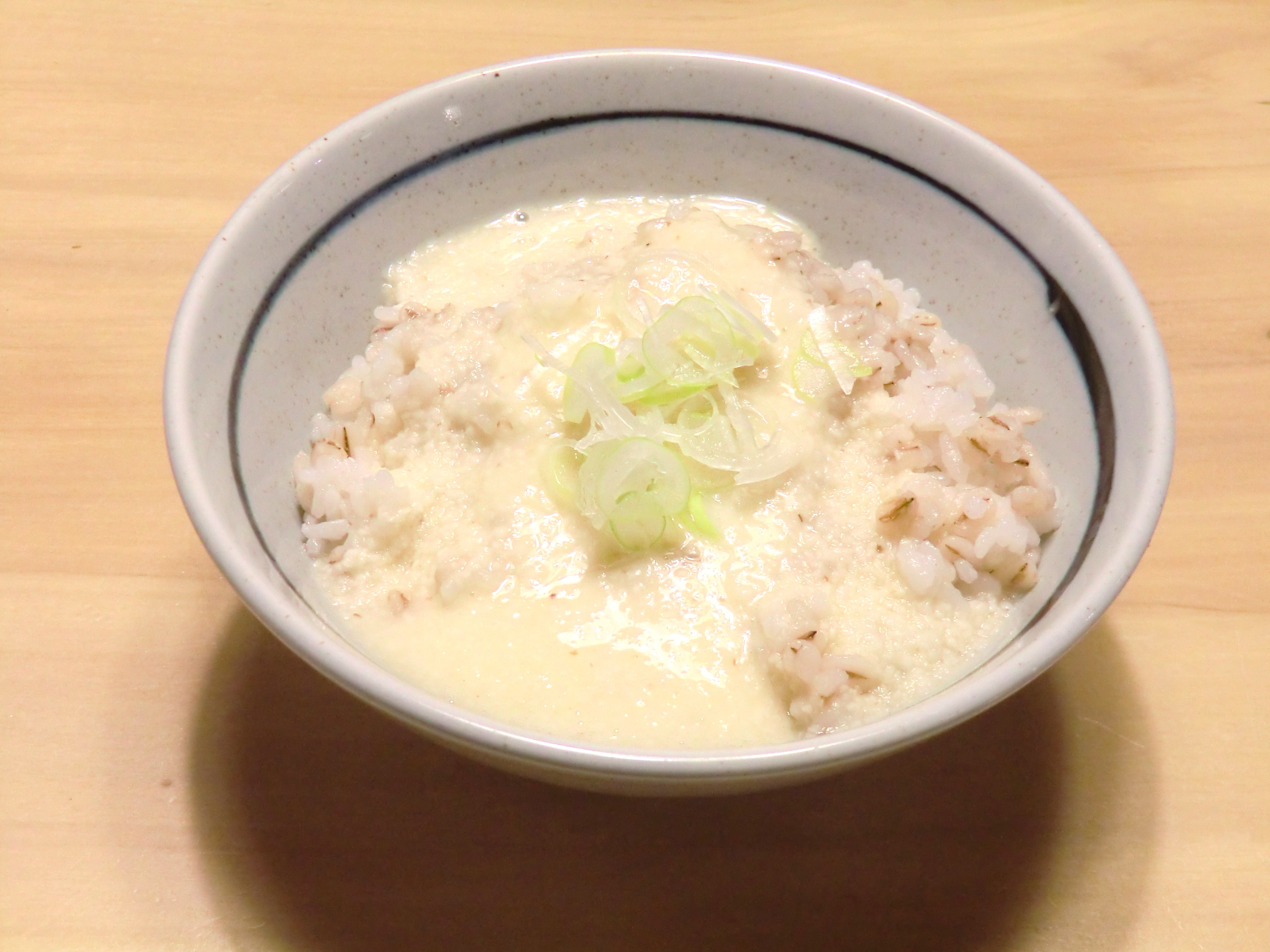
Mugitoro gohan

In Japanese cuisine, both the Chinese yam cultivars and the Japanese yam (often wild-foraged) are used interchangeably in dishes. The difference is that nagaimo tends to be more watery, while the native Japanese yam is more viscous.

Tororo is the mucilaginous purée made by grating varieties of the Chinese yam (nagaimo, ichōimo, tsukuneimo) or the native Japanese yam. The classic Japanese culinary technique is to grate the yam by grinding it against the rough grooved surface of a suribachi, an earthenware mortar. Or the yam is first grated crudely using an oroshigane grater, and subsequently worked into a smoother paste in the suribachi using a wooden pestle.

The tororo is mixed with other ingredients that typically include tsuyu broth (soy sauce and dashi), sometimes wasabi or green onions, and eaten over rice or mugimeshi (steam-cooked blend of rice and barley).

The tororo poured over raw tuna (maguro) sliced into cubes is called yamakake, and eaten with soy sauce and wasabi.

The tororo may also be poured over noodles to make tororo udon/soba. Noodles with grated yam over it is also called yamakake.

Grated yam is also used as a binding agent in the batter of okonomiyaki.

Sometimes the grated yam is used as an additive for making the skin of the manjū confection, in which case the product is called jōyo manjū (薯蕷饅頭; "yam manjū"). The yam is also used in making a regional confection called karukan, a specialty of the Kyūshū region.

==== Korean cuisine ====
In Korea, there are two main types of Chinese yam; the straight, tube-shaped variant is called jangma (Korean: 장마; lit. '"long ma"'), while danma (Korean: 단마; lit. '"short ma"') refers to the variant, which grows shorter, cluster-like tubes. Both are used in cooking and the tubers are prepared in a variety of ways. They are most commonly consumed raw, after the skinned roots have been blended with water, milk or yogurt (occasionally with additional honey) to create a nourishing drink known as majeup (마즙) or "ma juice" (마주스). Alternatively, the peeled tubers are cut into pieces and served—either raw, after cooking, steaming or frying, along with seasoning sauces.

== Cultivation ==
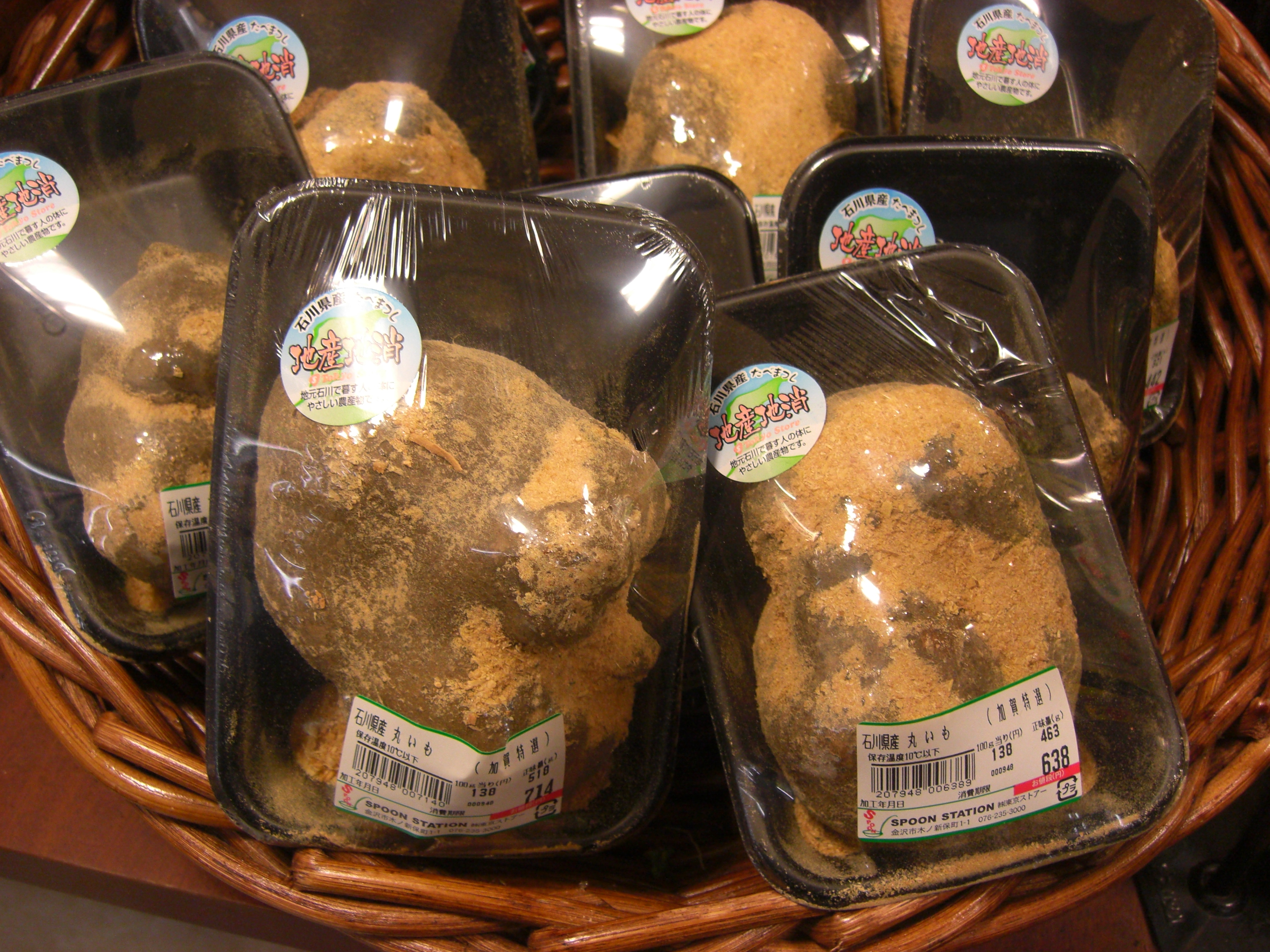
Kaga-maruimo, a Japanese cultivar

The Chinese yam's growing cycle spans approximately one year, and should be planted between winter and spring. The traditional methods growing it are: using smaller tubers, top cut of bigger tubers or through cuttings of branches. The first two methods can produce 20 cm (7.8 in) long tubers and above. The latter produces smaller tubers (10 cm or 4 in) that are usually replanted for the next year.

Between 7 and 9 months of replanting Chinese yam tubers, their leaves start to get dry (a common fact in plants that grow tubers), which indicates that the tubers are ready for harvest. In home gardens generally only what will be consumed is harvested, with the rest left in the pot in moist soil. The tuber is not frost-hardy.

== Gallery ==
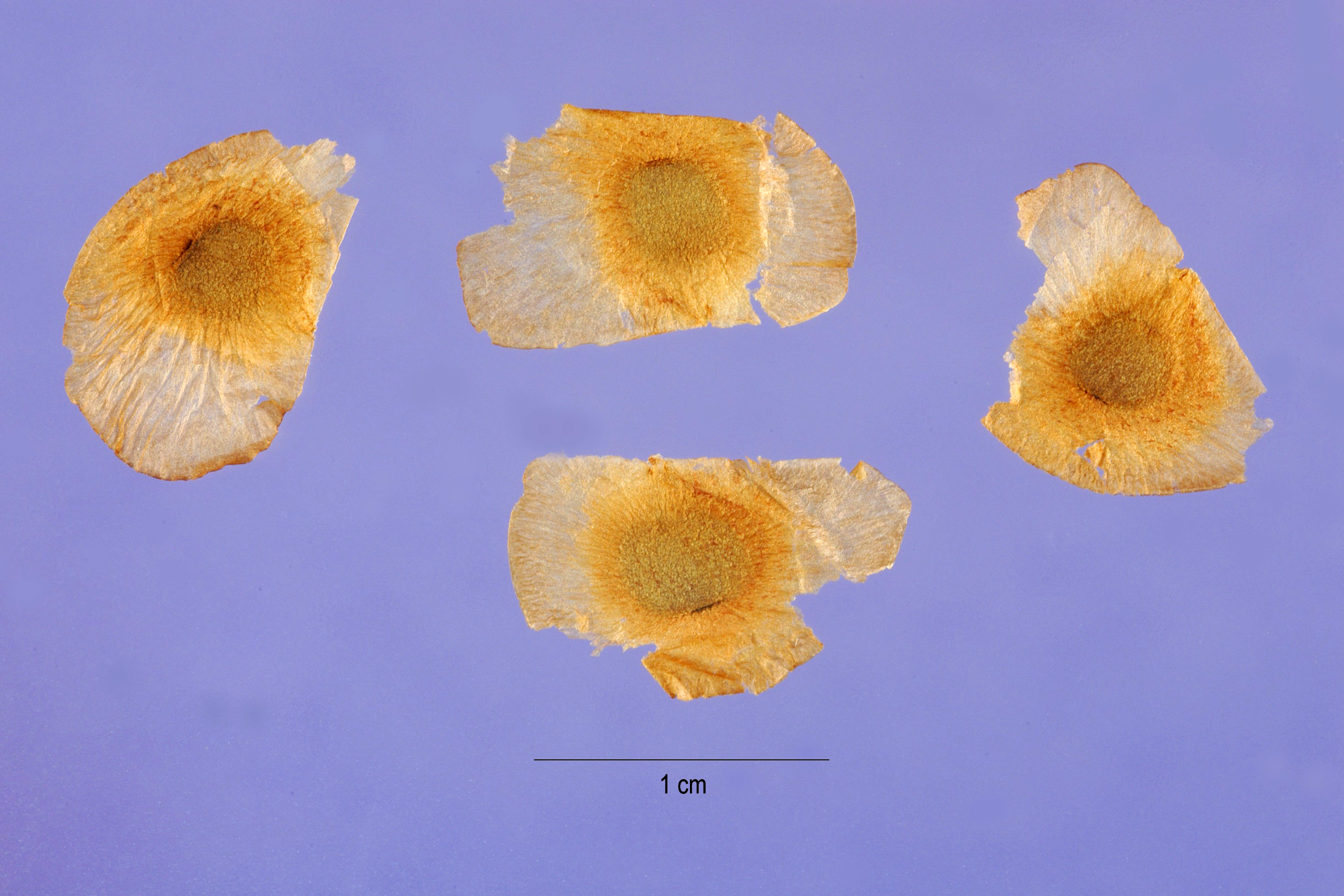
Seeds

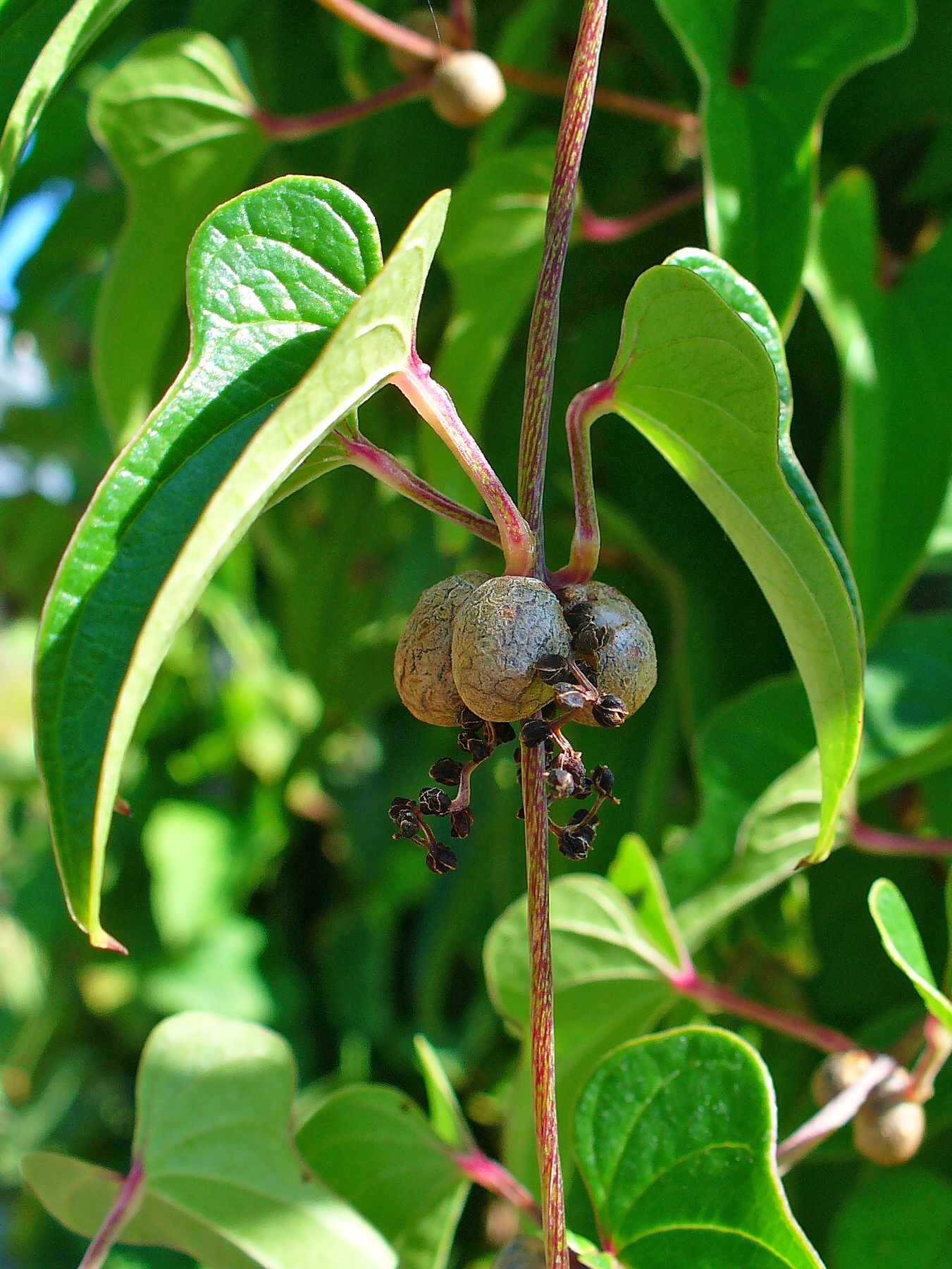

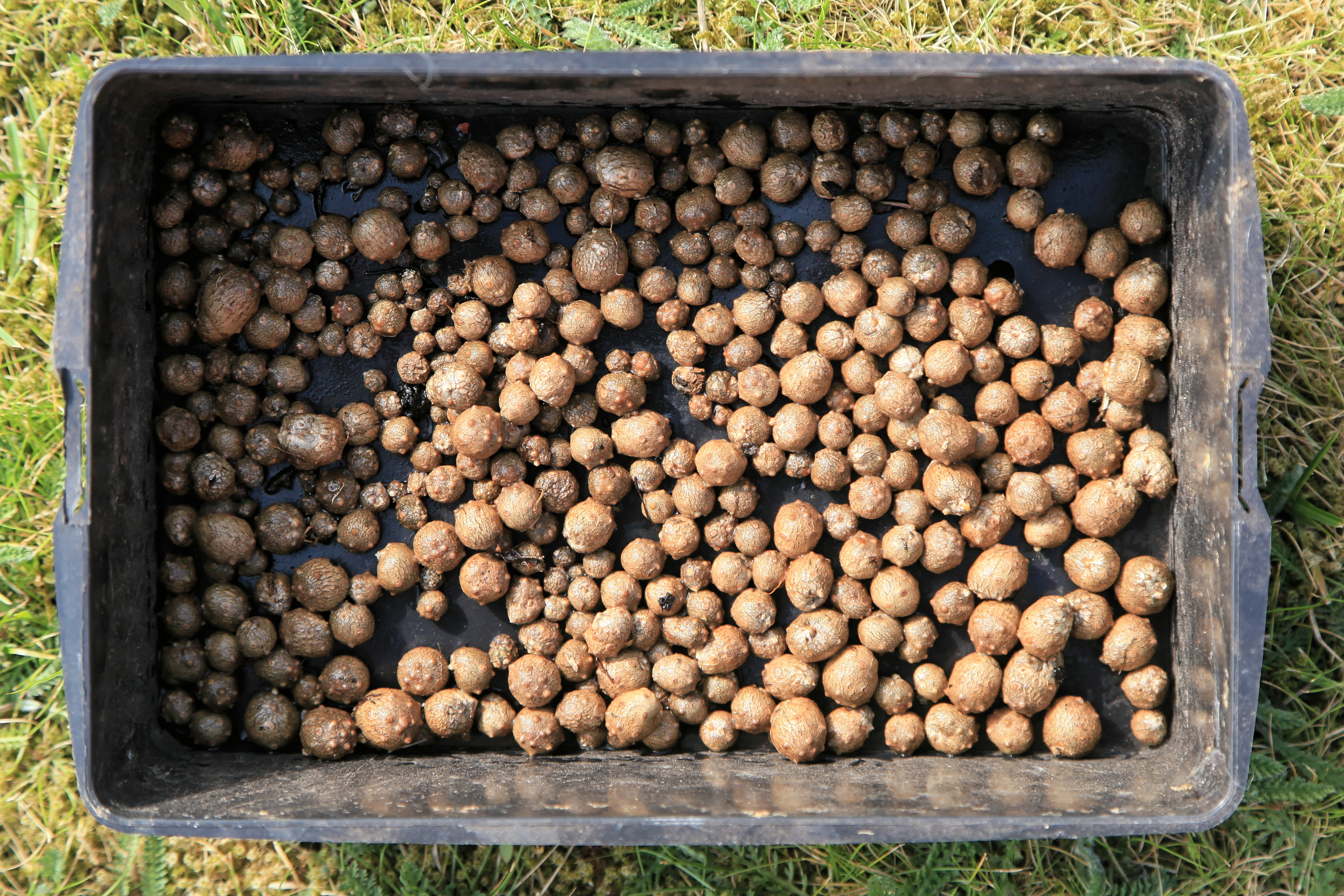

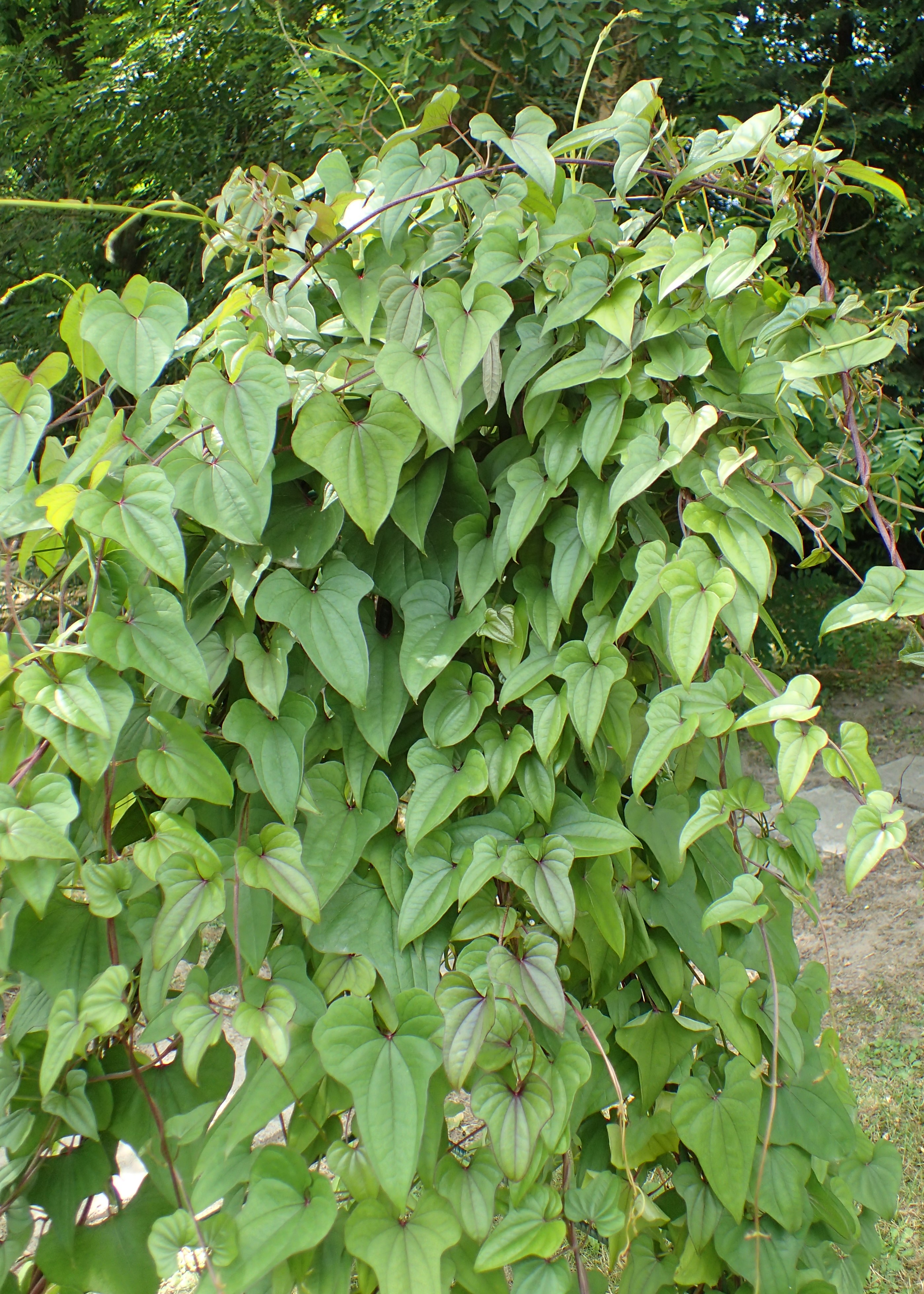

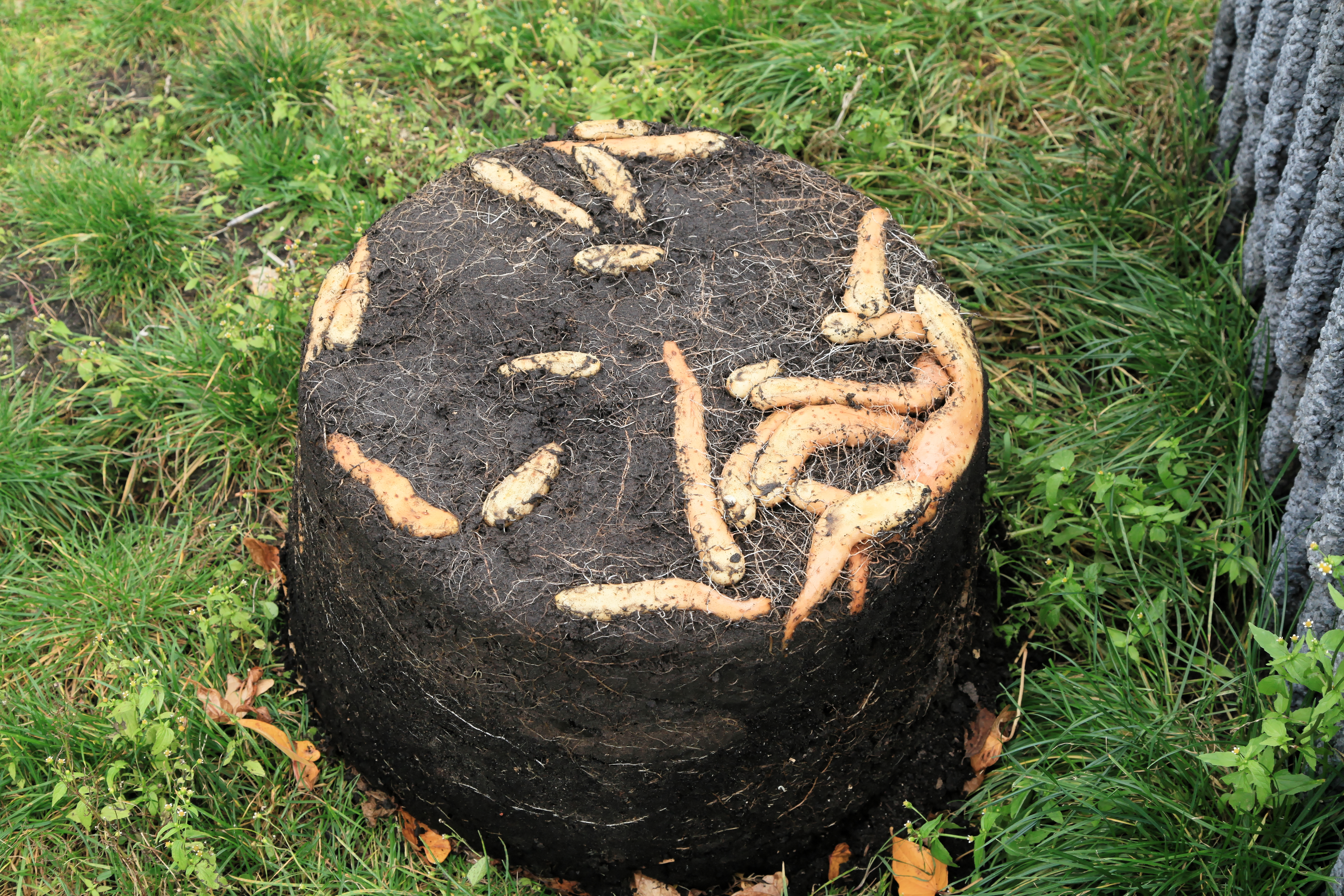

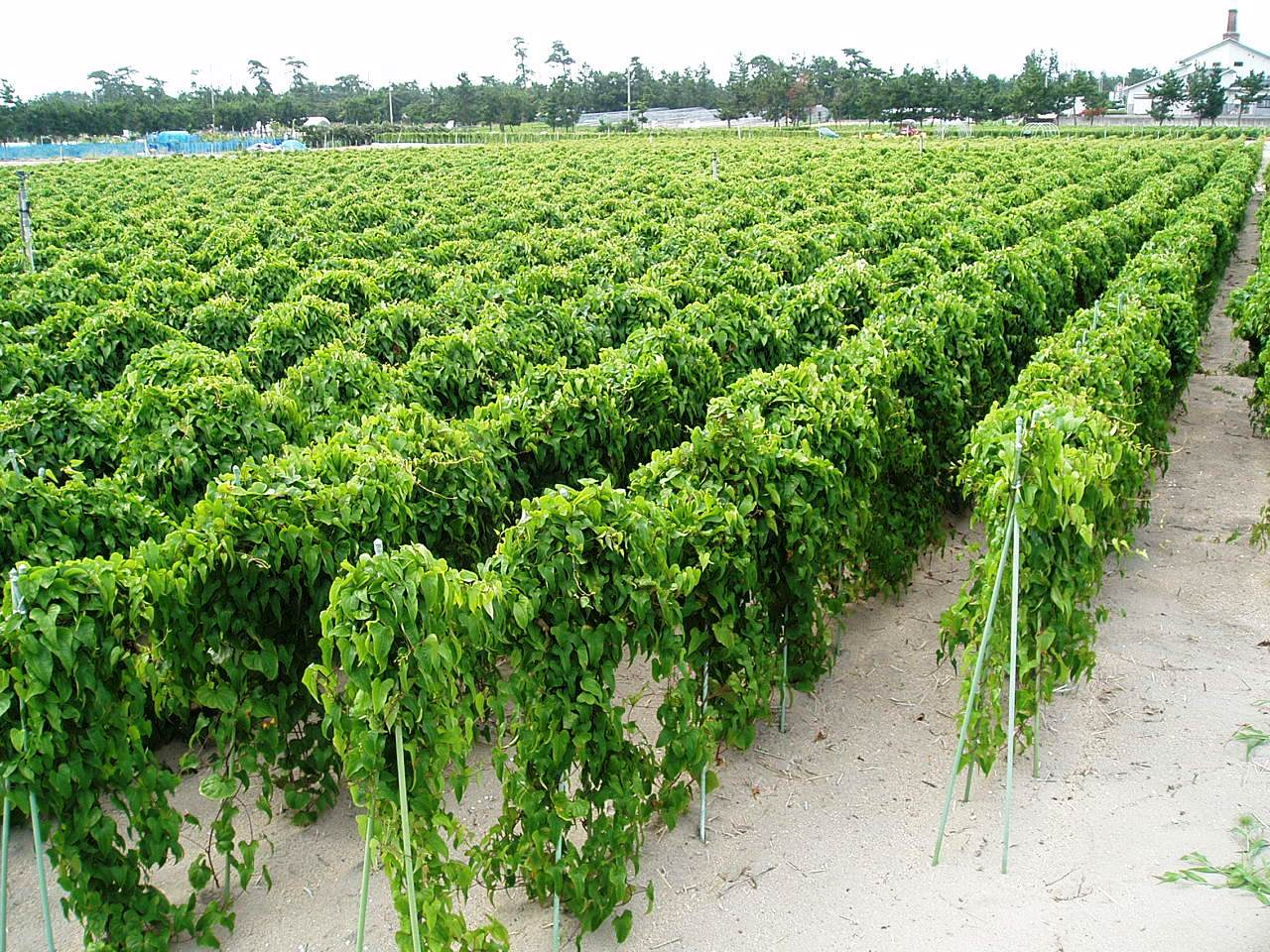
A Chinese yam (Nagaimo) plantation near Tottori

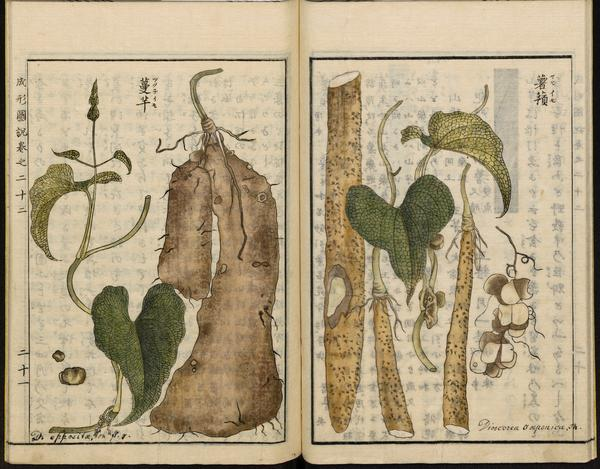

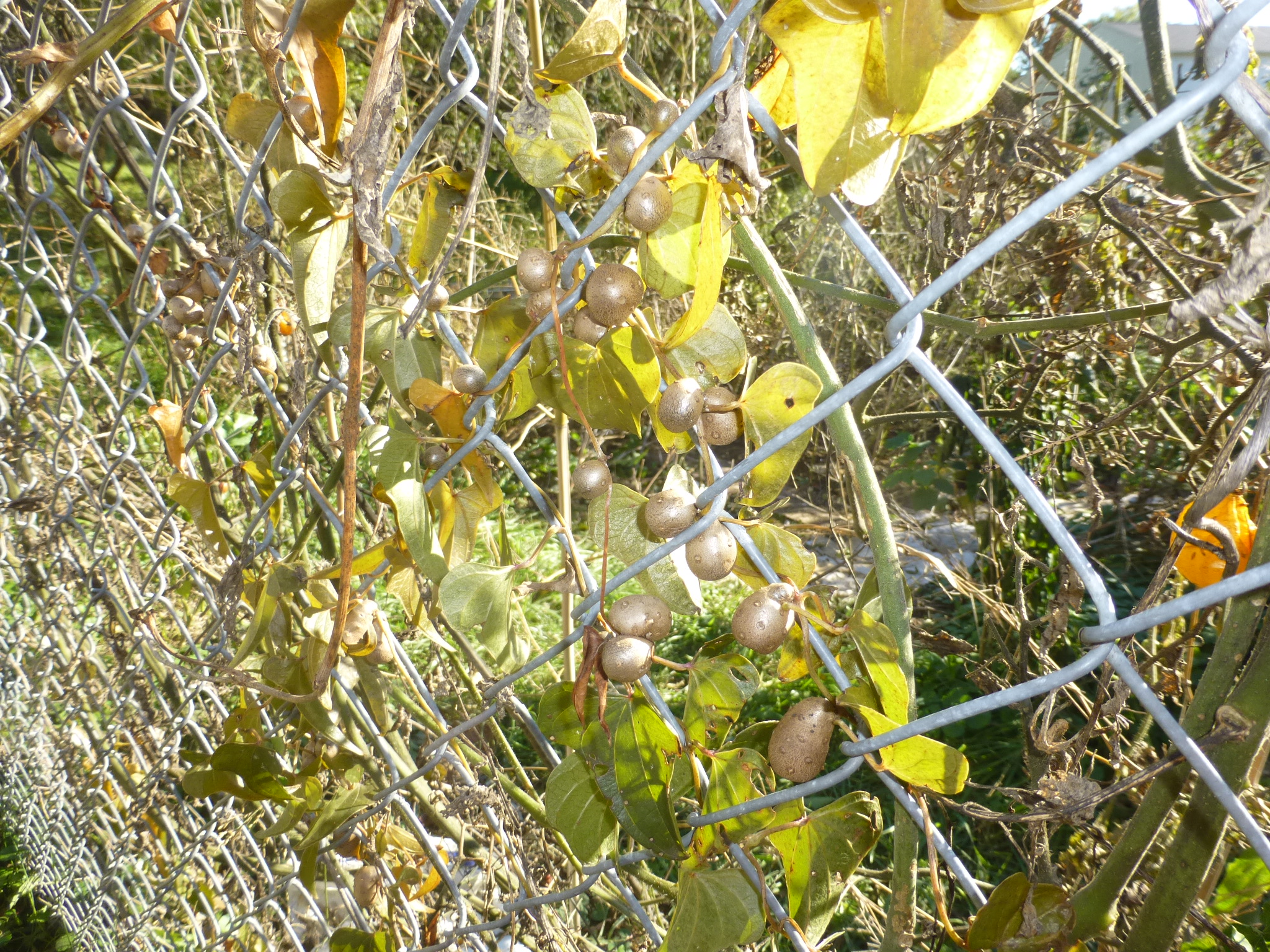

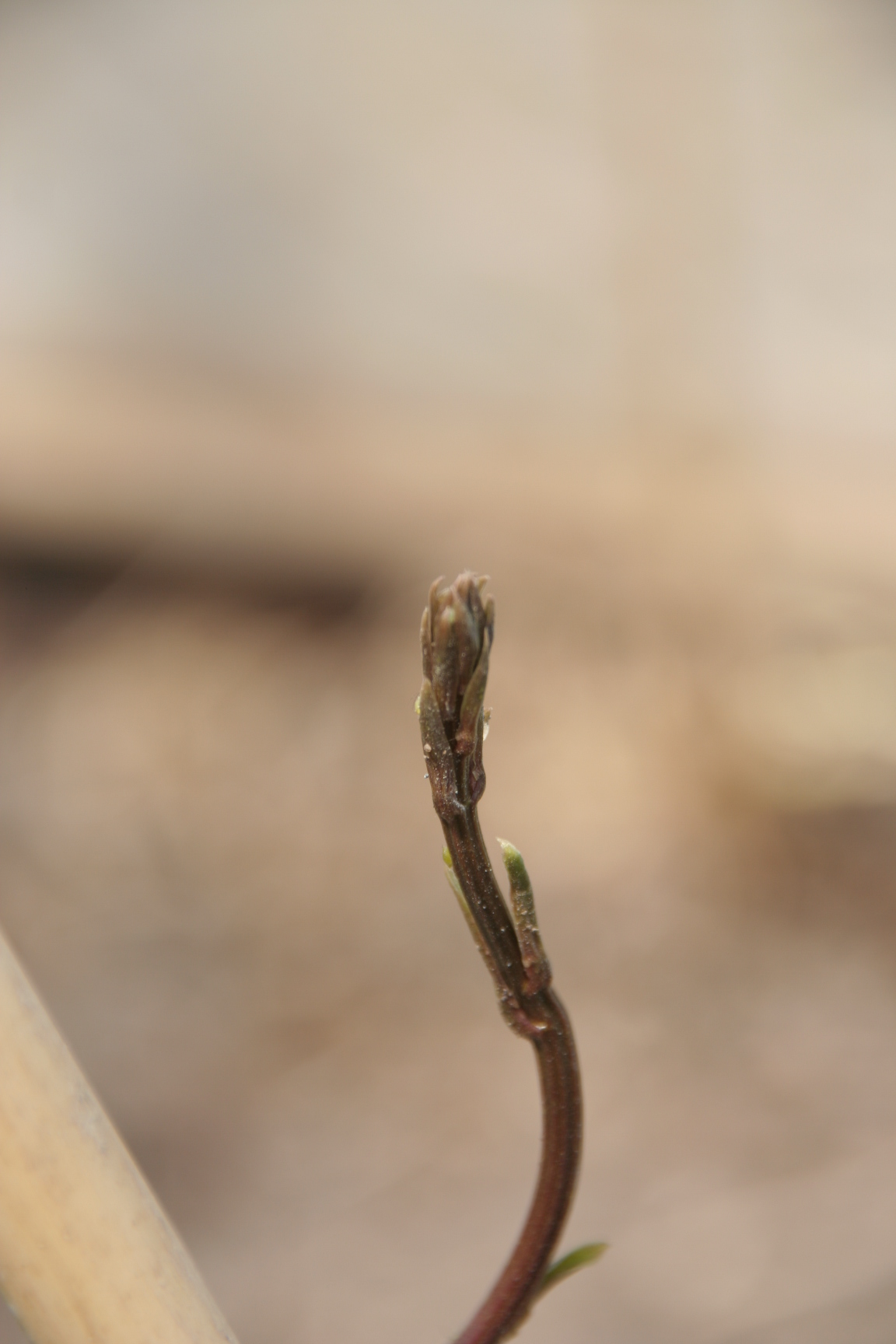

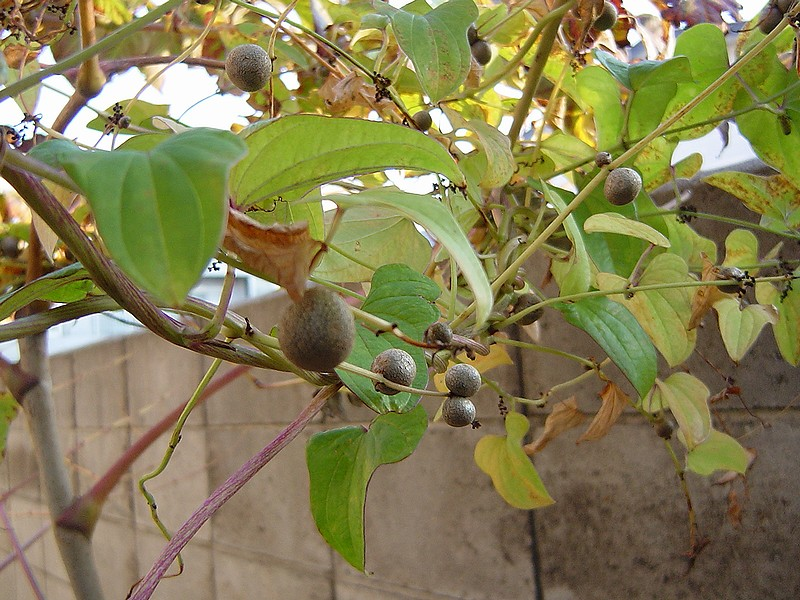

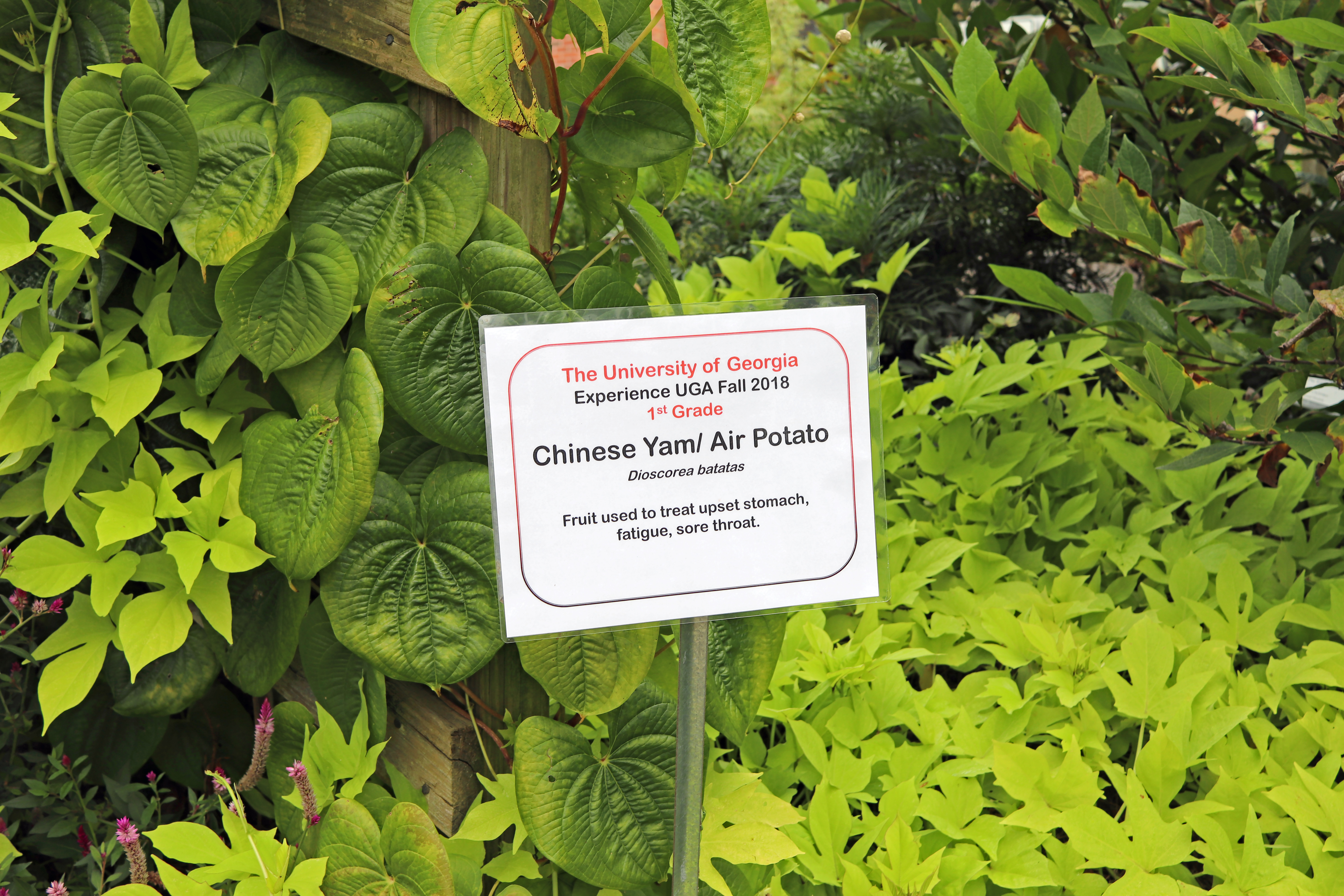

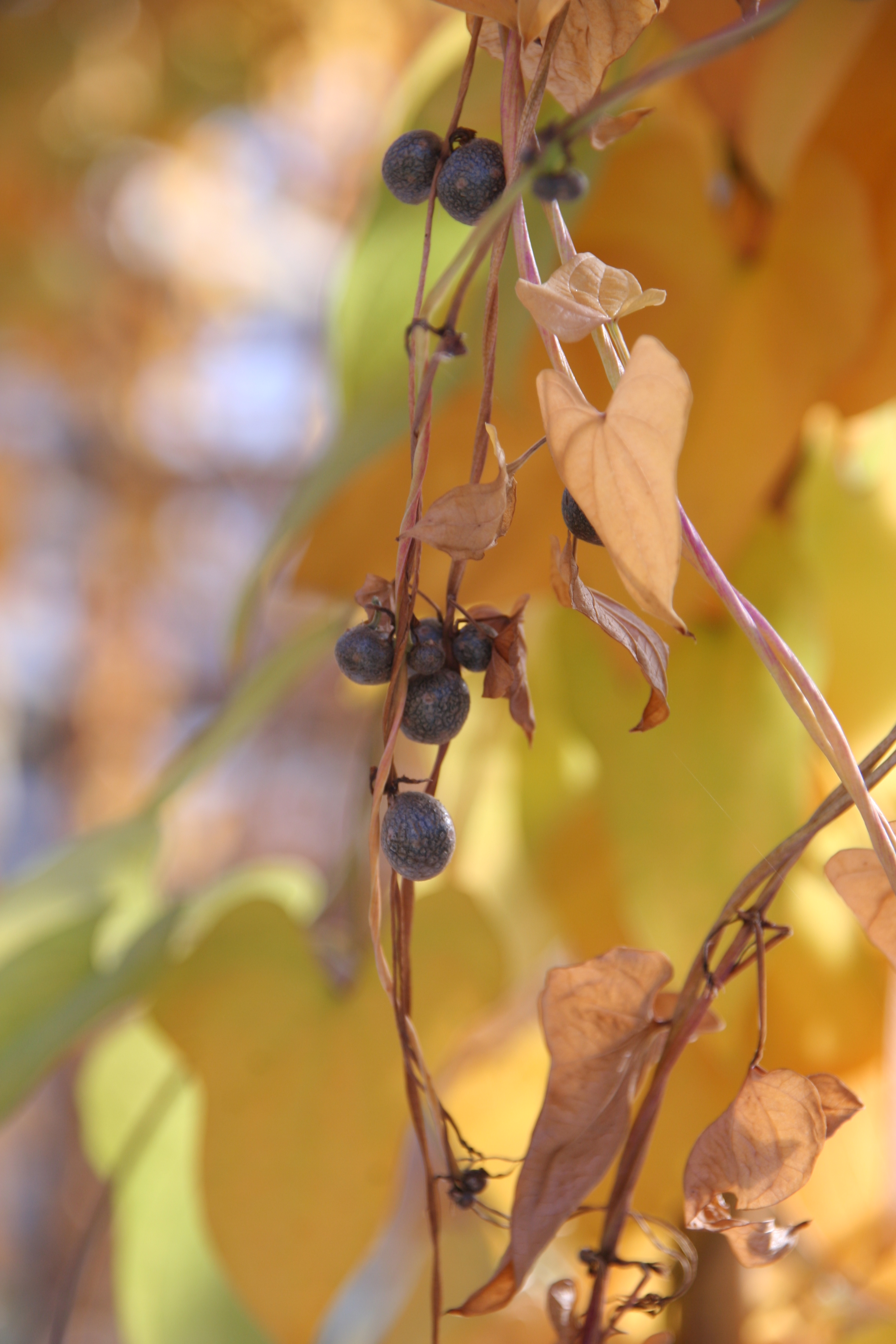

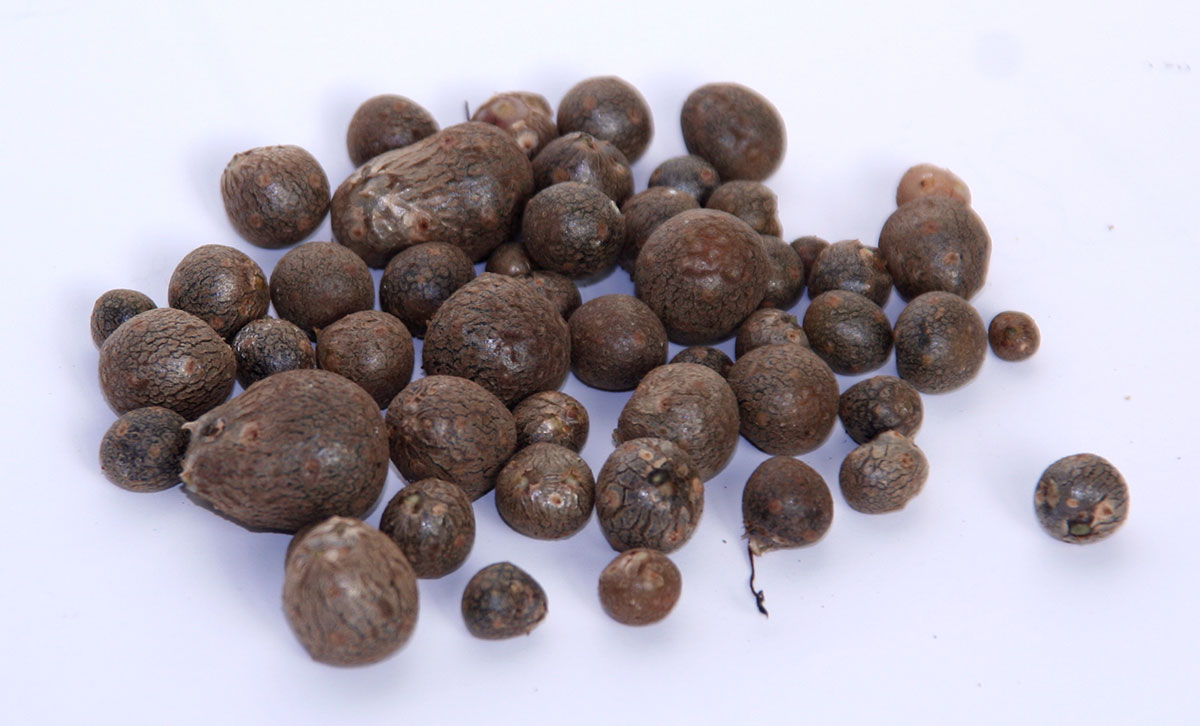

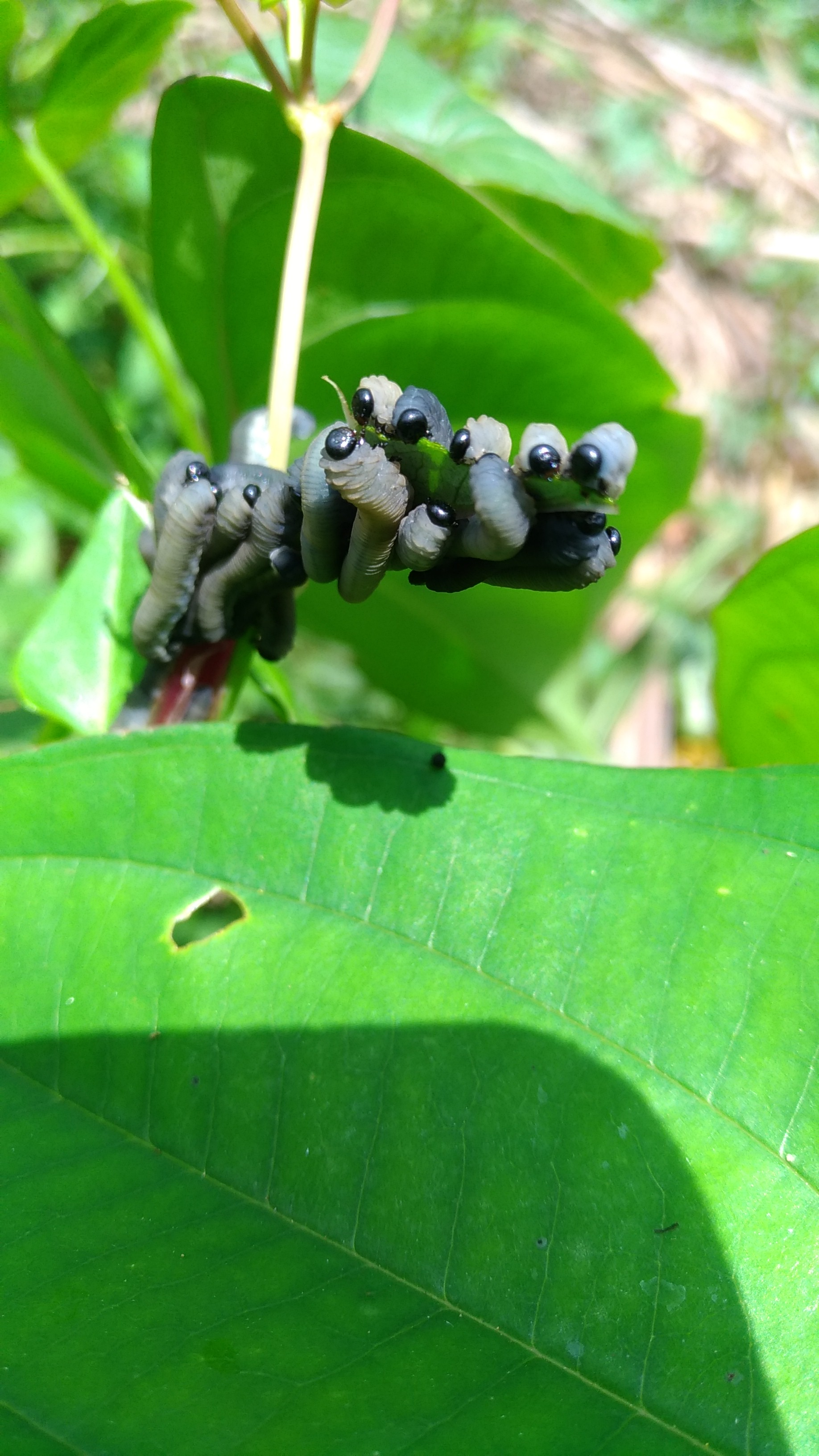

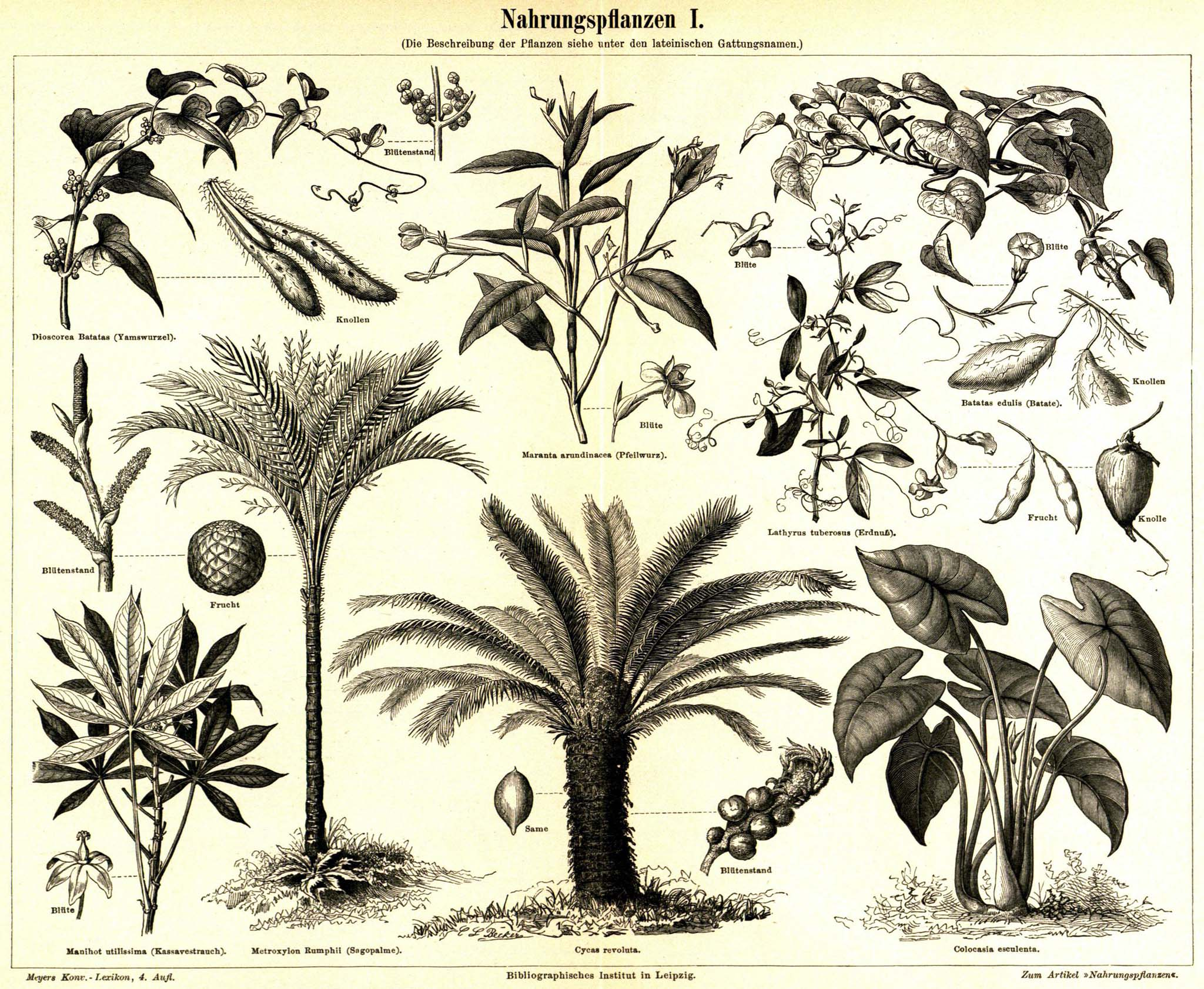

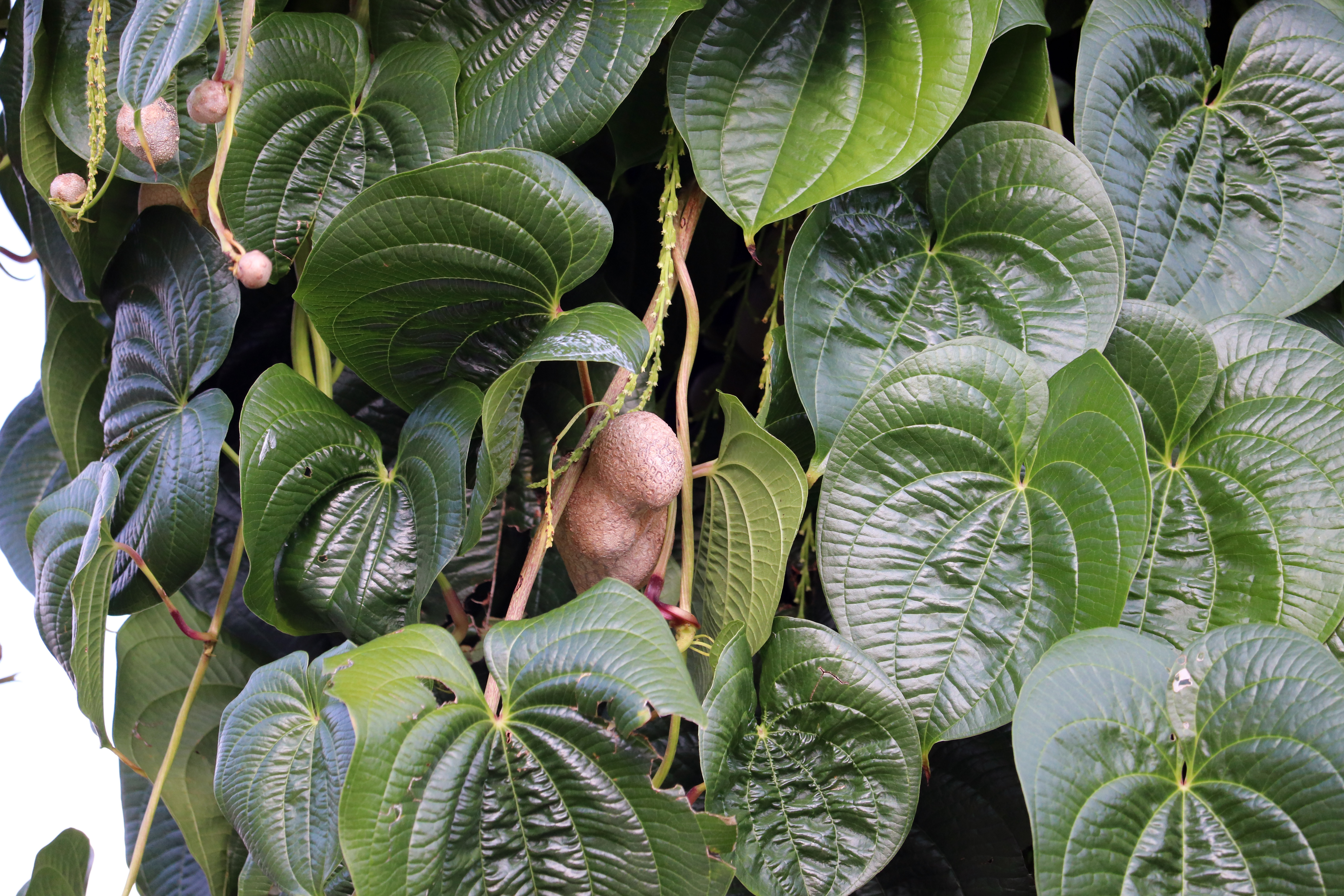

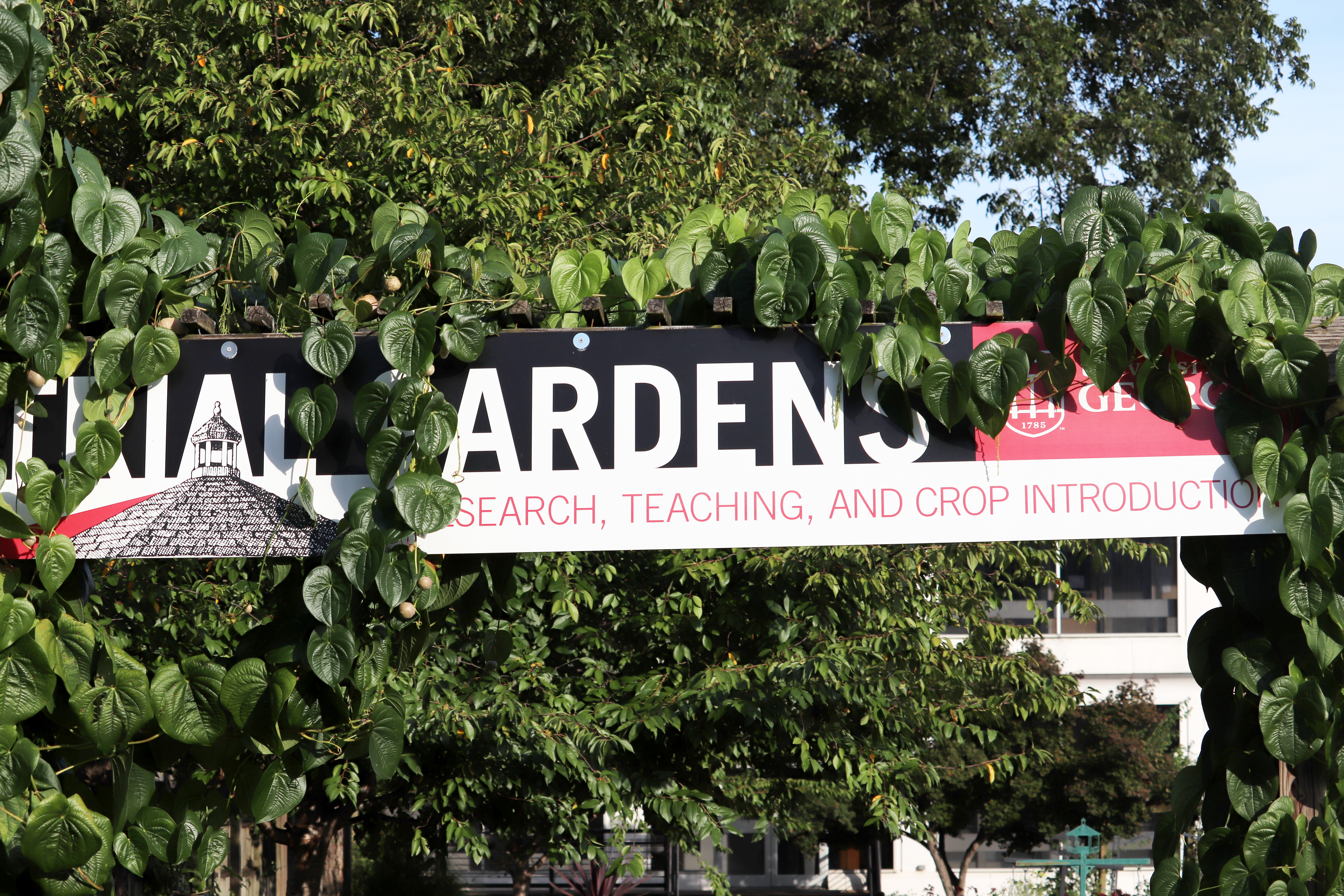

== See also ==
- Yam (vegetable)
- Dioscorea oppositifolia
- Dioscorea villosa
- Diosgenin
- List of ineffective cancer treatments
- Tremella fuciformis
