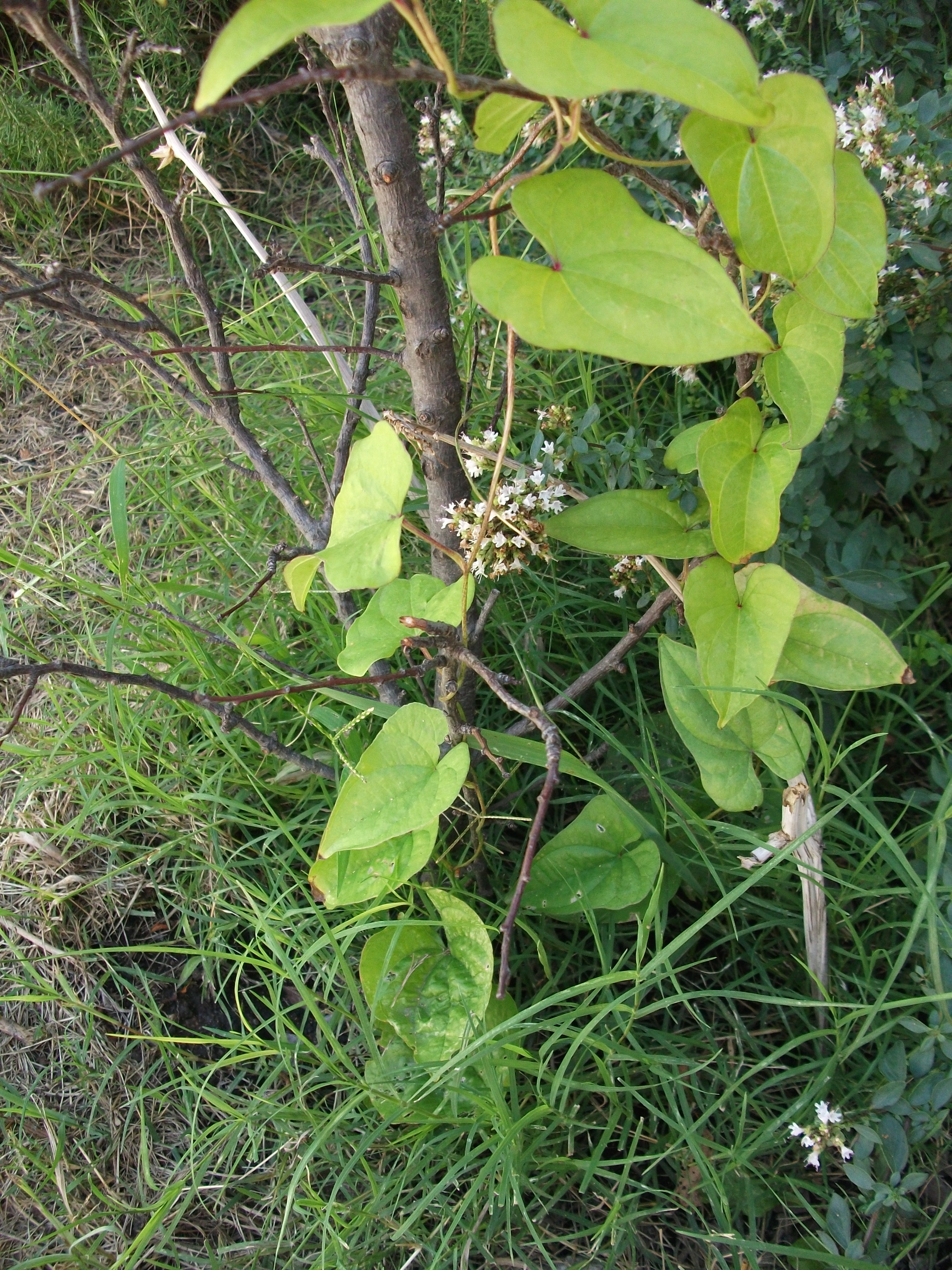

Scientific classification
- Kingdom: Plantae
- Clade: Tracheophytes
- Clade: Angiosperms
- Clade: Monocots
- Order: Dioscoreales
- Family: Dioscoreaceae
- Genus: Dioscorea
- Species: D. japonica

Binomial name
- Dioscorea japonica Thunb. 1784

= Dioscorea japonica =

Species of yam from Asia

Dioscorea japonica, known as East Asian mountain yam, yamaimo, or Japanese mountain yam, is a type of yam (Dioscorea) native to Japan (including Ryukyu and Bonin Islands), Korea, China, Taiwan, and Assam.

Dioscorea japonica is used for food. Jinenjo, also called the wild yam, is a related variety of Japanese yam that is used as an ingredient in soba noodles.

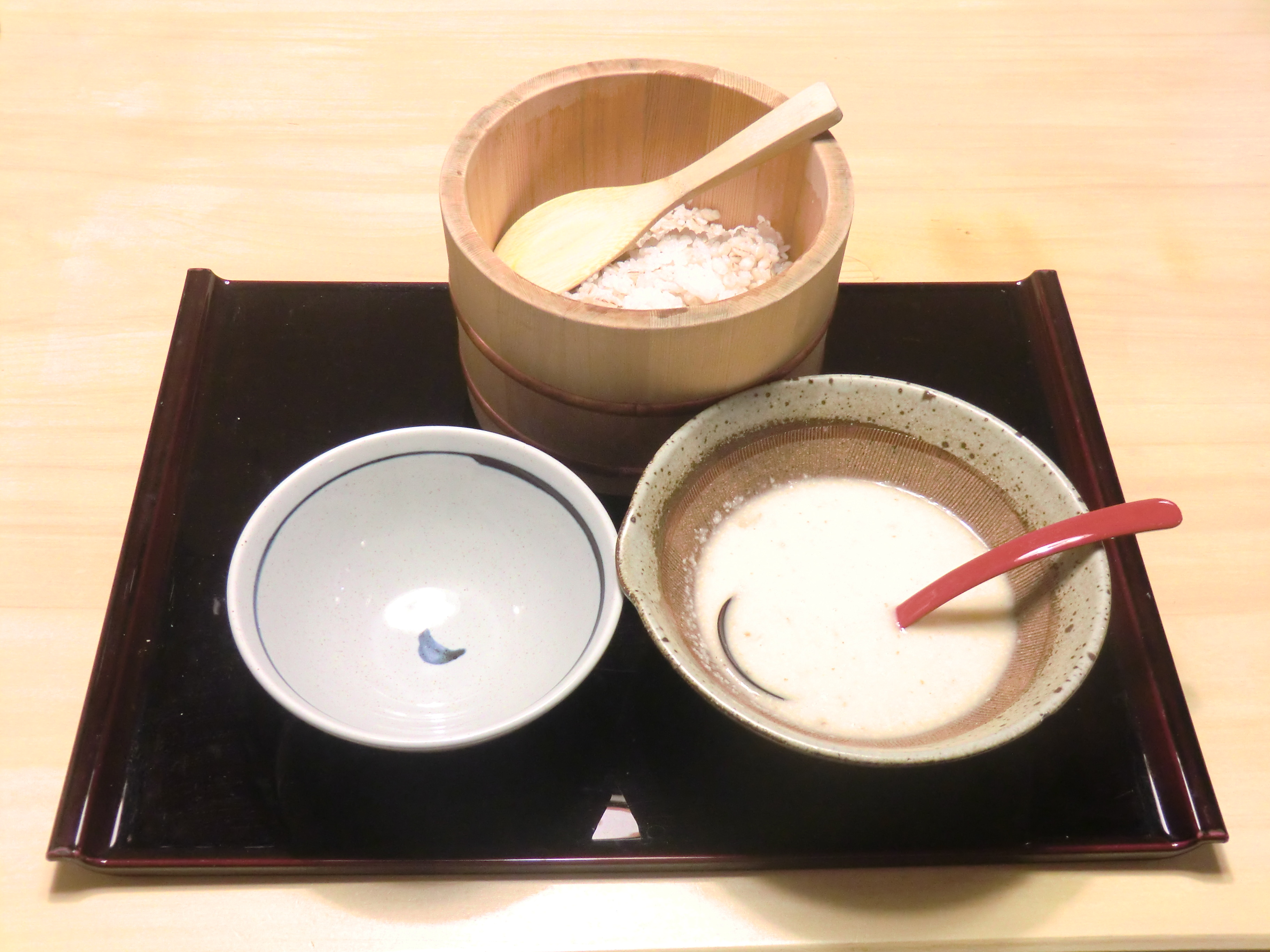
Mugitoro gohan

== Names ==
In Japanese, it is known as yamaimo (山芋; "mountain yam"). Jinenjo (自然薯; "wild yam") is another kind of Dioscorea japonica, which is native to fields and mountains in Japan.

In Chinese, Dioscorea japonica is known as yě shānyào (野山藥) which translates to English as "wild Chinese yam" or simply "wild yam". Another name is Rìběn shǔyù (日本薯蕷; literally "Japanese yam").

In Korean, it is known as cham ma (참마), as well as dang ma (당마).

== Chemistry ==
Dioscorea japonica contains the antimutagenic compounds eudesmol and paeonol.

== Varieties ==
Several formal botanical varieties have been proposed. Four are accepted:

- Dioscorea japonica var. japonica - Japan (Ryukyu, Bonin), Korea, Taiwan, China (Anhui, Fujian, Guangdong, Guangxi, Guizhou, Hubei, Hunan, Jiangsu, Jiangxi, Sichuan, Zhejiang)
- Dioscorea japonica var. nagarum Prain & Burkill - India (Assam)
- Dioscorea japonica var. oldhamii R.Knuth - China (Guangdong, Guangxi), Taiwan
- Dioscorea japonica var. pilifera C.T.Ting & M.C.Chang - China (Anhui, Fujian, Guangxi, Guizhou, Hubei, Hunan, Jiangsu, Jiangxi, Zhejiang)

== Uses ==
In Japanese cuisine, both the Japanese yam and the introduced Chinese yam are used interchangeably in dishes and recipes.

The yam's aerial tubercles, or bulbils, called mukago, are also eaten. They are often cooked and served with white rice.

== See also ==
- Tororo (food), a Japanese dish made from grating raw yams such as yamaimo
