= Elizabeth Cox =

Elizabeth Cox may refer to:

- Elizabeth Cox (actress), English stage actress of the seventeenth century
- Elizabeth Cox (historian), New Zealand historian
- Elizabeth Cox (humanitarian), Australian community development specialist
