= Agricultural value chain =

Agricultural product movement concept

An agricultural value chain is the integrated range of goods and services (value chain) necessary for an agricultural product to move from the producer to the final consumer. The concept has been used since the beginning of the millennium, primarily by those working in agricultural development in developing countries, although there is no universally accepted definition of the term.

== Background ==
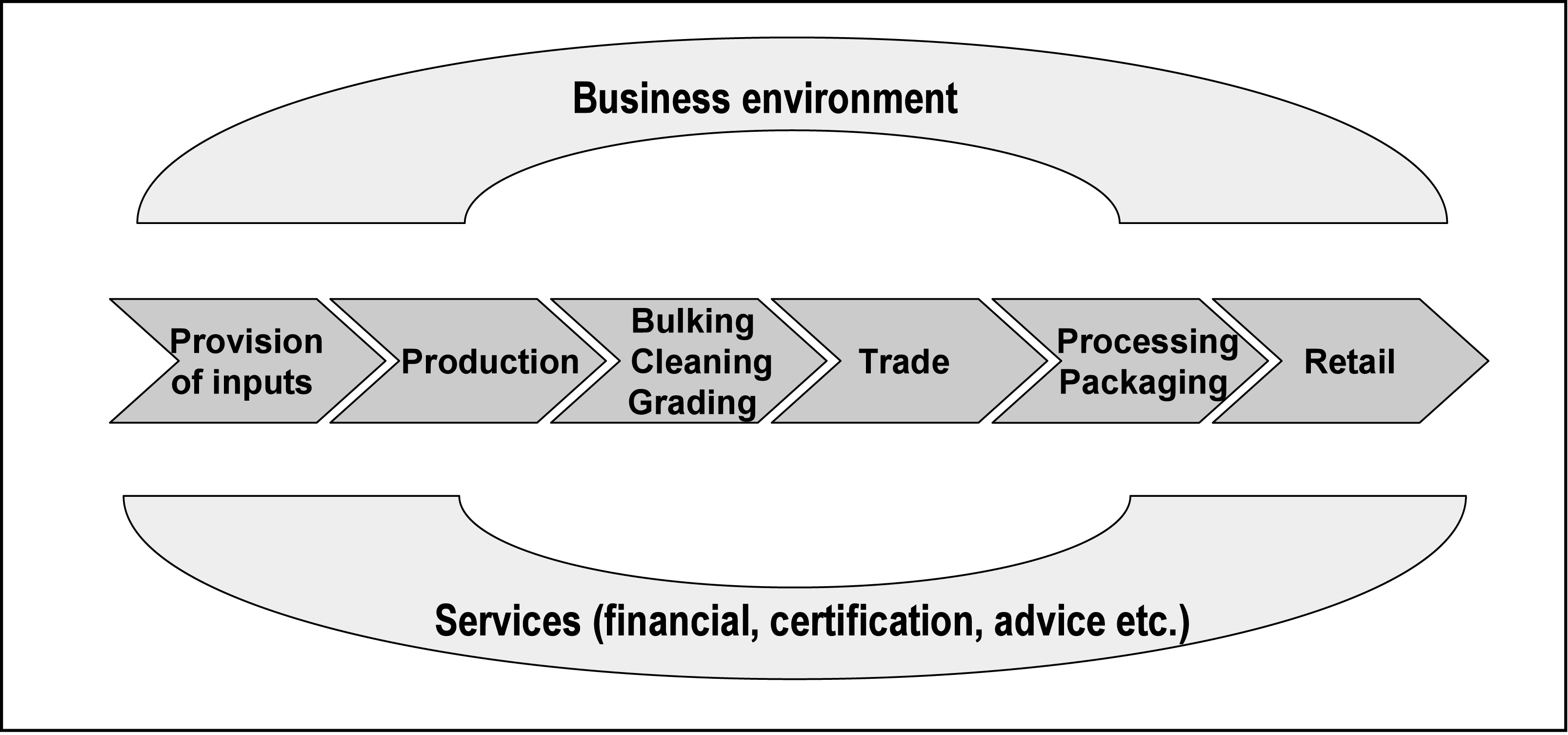
Value chain representation

The term value chain was first popularized in a book published in 1985 by Michael Porter, who used it to illustrate how companies could achieve what he called "competitive advantage" by adding value within their organization. Subsequently, the term was adopted for agricultural development purposes and has now become very much in vogue among those working in this field, with most bilateral and multilateral aid organisations using it to guide their development interventions.

At the heart of the agricultural value chain concept is the idea of actors connected along a chain producing and delivering goods to consumers through a sequence of activities. However, this "vertical" chain cannot function in isolation and an important aspect of the value chain approach is that it also considers "horizontal" impacts on the chain, such as input and finance provision, extension support and the general enabling environment. The approach has been found useful, particularly by donors, in that it has resulted in a consideration of all those factors impacting on the ability of farmers to access markets profitably, leading to a broader range of chain interventions. It is used both for upgrading existing chains and for donors to identify market opportunities for small farmers.

== Definitions ==
There is no commonly agreed definition of what is actually meant by agricultural value chains. Indeed, some agencies are using the term without having a workable definition or definitions and simply redefined ongoing activities as "value chain" work when the term came into vogue. Published definitions include the World Bank's "the term value chain describes the full range of value adding activities required to bring a product or service through the different phases of production, including procurement of raw materials and other inputs", UNIDO's "actors connected along a chain producing, transforming and bringing goods and services to end-consumers through a sequenced set of activities", and CIAT's "a strategic network among a number of business organizations".

Without a universal definition, the term "value chain" is now being used to refer to a range of types of chain, including:

- An international, or regional commodity market. Examples could include "the global cotton value chain", "the southern African maize value chain" or "the Brazilian coffee value chain";
- A national or local commodity market or marketing system such as "the Ghanaian tomato value chain" or ""the Accra tomato value chain";
- A supply chain, which can cover both of the above;
- An extended supply chain or marketing channel, which embraces all activities needed to produce the product, including information/extension, planning, input supply and finance. It is probably the most common usage of the value chain term;
- A dedicated chain designed to meet the needs of one or a limited number of buyers. This usage, which is arguably most faithful to Porter's concept, stresses that a value chain is designed to capture value for all actors by carrying out activities to meet the demand of consumers or of a particular retailer, processor or food service company supplying those consumers. Emphasis is firmly placed on demand as the source of the value.

== Value chain methodologies ==
Donors and others supporting agricultural development, such as FAO, World Bank, GIZ, DFID, ILO, IIED and UNIDO, have produced a range of documents designed to assist their staff and others to evaluate value chains in order to decide on the most appropriate interventions to either update existing chains or promote new ones. However, the application of value chain analysis has been interpreted differently by different organisations, with possible repercussions for their development impact. The proliferation of guides has taken place in an environment where key conceptual and methodological elements of value chain analysis and development are still evolving. Many of these guides include not only detailed procedures that require experts to carry out the analysis but also use detailed quasi-academic methodologies. One such methodology is to compare the same value chain over time (a comparative or panel study) to assess changes in rents, governance, systemic efficiency and the institutional framework.

== Linking farmers to markets ==
A major subset of value chain development work is concerned with ways of linking producers to companies, and hence into the value chains. While there are examples of fully integrated value chains that do not involve smallholders (e.g. Unilever operates tea estates and tea processing facilities in Kenya and then blends and packs the tea in Europe before selling it as Lipton, Brooke Bond or PG Tips brands), the great bulk of agricultural value chains involve sales to companies from independent farmers. Such arrangements frequently involve contract farming in which the farmer undertakes to supply agreed quantities of a crop or livestock product, based on the quality standards and delivery requirements of the purchaser, often at a price that is established in advance. Companies often also agree to support the farmer through input supply, land preparation, extension advice and transporting produce to their premises.

== Inclusive value chains ==
Work to promote market linkages in developing countries is often based on the concept of "inclusive value chains", which usually places emphasis on identifying possible ways in which small-scale farmers can be incorporated into existing or new value chains or can extract greater value from the chain, either by increasing efficiency or by also carrying out activities further along the chain. In the various publications on the topic the definition of "inclusion" is often imprecise as it is often unclear whether the development aim is to include all farmers or only those best able to take advantage of the opportunities. Emerging literature in the last two decades increasingly references the value of responsible sourcing or what are called "sustainable supply chains".

== Sustainability ==
The private sector's role in achieving sustainability has increasingly been recognized since the publication of Our Common Future (Brundtland Report) in 1987 by the World Commission on Environment and Development. More recently, the role of value chains has become very prominent and businesses are emerging as the primary catalyst for sustainability. Kevin Dooley, Chief Scientist of the Sustainability Consortium, argues that such market-based mechanisms are the most efficient and effective way to induce the adoption of sustainable practices. Still, there are concerns about whether value chains are really driving sustainability or merely green-washing.

These concepts can also be expanded or understood as power dynamics. In the last decade or so, hybrid forms of governance have emerged where business, civil society and public actors interact, and these multi-stakeholder approaches claim new concepts of legitimacy and even more likely sustainability.

Scholars including Michael Schmidt (Dean and Department Chair, University Brandenburg and Daniele Giovannucci (President of the Committee on Sustainability Assessment) consider that evidence is emerging on what makes a value chain sustainable.

There is evidence too that global value chains that have an impact on the environment and the societies they serve such as farmers and suppliers can be effectively measured. The World Bank also supports the perspective that GVCs can be valuable for sustainable development and provides an array of examples and data.

== Finance ==
Agricultural value chain finance is concerned with the flows of funds to and within a value chain to meet the needs of chain actors for finance, to secure sales, to buy inputs or produce, or to improve efficiency. Examining the potential for value chain finance involves a holistic approach to analyze the chain, those working in it, and their inter-linkages. These linkages allow financing to flow through the chain. For example, inputs can be provided to farmers and the cost can be repaid directly when the product is delivered, without need for farmers taking a loan from a bank or similar institution. This is common under contract farming arrangements. Types of value chain finance include product financing through trader and input supplier credit or credit supplied by a marketing company or a lead firm. Other trade finance instruments include receivables financing where the bank advances funds against an assignment of future receivables from the buyer, and factoring in which a business sells its accounts receivable at a discount. Also falling under value chain finance are asset collateralization, such as on the basis of warehouse receipts, and risk mitigation, such as forward contracting, futures and insurance.

== Use of ICTs ==
Information and communication technologies, or ICTs, have become an important tool in promoting agricultural value chain efficiency. There has been a rapid expansion in the use of mobile technologies, in particular. The price of ICT services is falling and the technologies are becoming more affordable to many in developing countries. Applications can support farmers directly through SMS messages. Examples include iCow, developed in Kenya, which provides information on the gestation period, on artificial insemination of the cows, and on how to look after them. Applications such as M-Pesa can support access to mobile payment services for a large percentage of those without banks, thereby facilitating transactions in the value chain. Other applications have been developed to promote provision of crop insurance through input dealers, for example.

ICTs are also being used to strengthen the capacity of agricultural extension officers and NGO field staff to reach farmers with timely and accurate information and, at the same time, help capture data from the field. The Grameen Foundation's Community Knowledge Worker (CKW) programme is a small-scale example. Farmer representatives are trained to use ICT applications on a smartphone to provide agricultural information and extension support. Other efforts include Lutheran World Relief's Mobile Farmer and diverse efforts funded by the Bill and Melinda Gates Foundation in Africa. Most market price information is now delivered to farmers via SMS. Further along the chain, technologies offer considerable possibilities to enhance traceability, which is particularly relevant as certification grows in importance. Where necessary many exporters can now trace consignments back to individual farmers and take necessary measures to address problems. Finally, systems such as eRails, promoted by the Forum for Agricultural Research in Africa, are also supporting agricultural researchers through data collection and analysis and access to up-to-date research publications.

== Value chain innovation ==
Agricultural value chains are constantly being improved. In addition to ICTs, innovations have taken place both at the retail level through, for example, online food delivery services; and in production, processing, and distribution, such as through the use of agricultural drones and precision farming, improved supply chain management, and food traceability. As a result of data digitalization, farmers can now access data on soil, climate, irrigation, pests and diseases, and market prices. Food delivery businesses use data to increase their awareness of customer preferences, and data can also be used to reduce food loss and waste.

For small famers, however, innovating can pose significant challenges. Similarly, small agro-industries have been slow to adopt automation and digitalization when compared with larger companies and multinationals. Digitalization of agriculture is expensive, and requires the availability of relevant skills, so few small farmers in emerging economies presently use such technologies or, if they do, fail to exploit their full potential. Although small businesses have developed to make data-driven farming possible for smallholders, they struggle to monetize their services, which are often donor-supported and provided to farmers at little or no cost. On the other hand, large-scale farmers are usually intensive users of digital technologies. This has the impact of widening the efficiency gap between larger farms or plantations and smallholder farmers, leading to growing inequalities within food systems. Innovation at the smallholder level tends to work best when the policy environment favours value chain development and the chain offers significant potential for value addition.

== Enabling environments ==
As with all agricultural growth, two things appear essential for successful value chain development: creating the right environment for agriculture and investing in rural public goods. An enabling environment implies peace and public order, macro-economic stability, inflation under control, exchange rates based on market fundamentals rather than government allocation of foreign currency, predictable taxation that is reinvested in public goods and property rights. There is a positive correlation of agricultural growth with investment in irrigation, transport infrastructure and other technologies. Governments have a responsibility to provide essential goods and services, infrastructure, such as rural roads, and agricultural research and extension. Value chain development is often constrained by corruption, both at a high level and at the ubiquitous road blocks found in many countries, particularly in Africa. Many measures to improve value chains require collaboration between a wide range of different ministries, and this can be difficult to achieve.

== See also ==
- Agribusiness
- Agricultural marketing
- Agricultural diversification
- Contract farming
- Value chain
