= Wholesale marketing of food =

Role and operations of agricultural wholesale markets

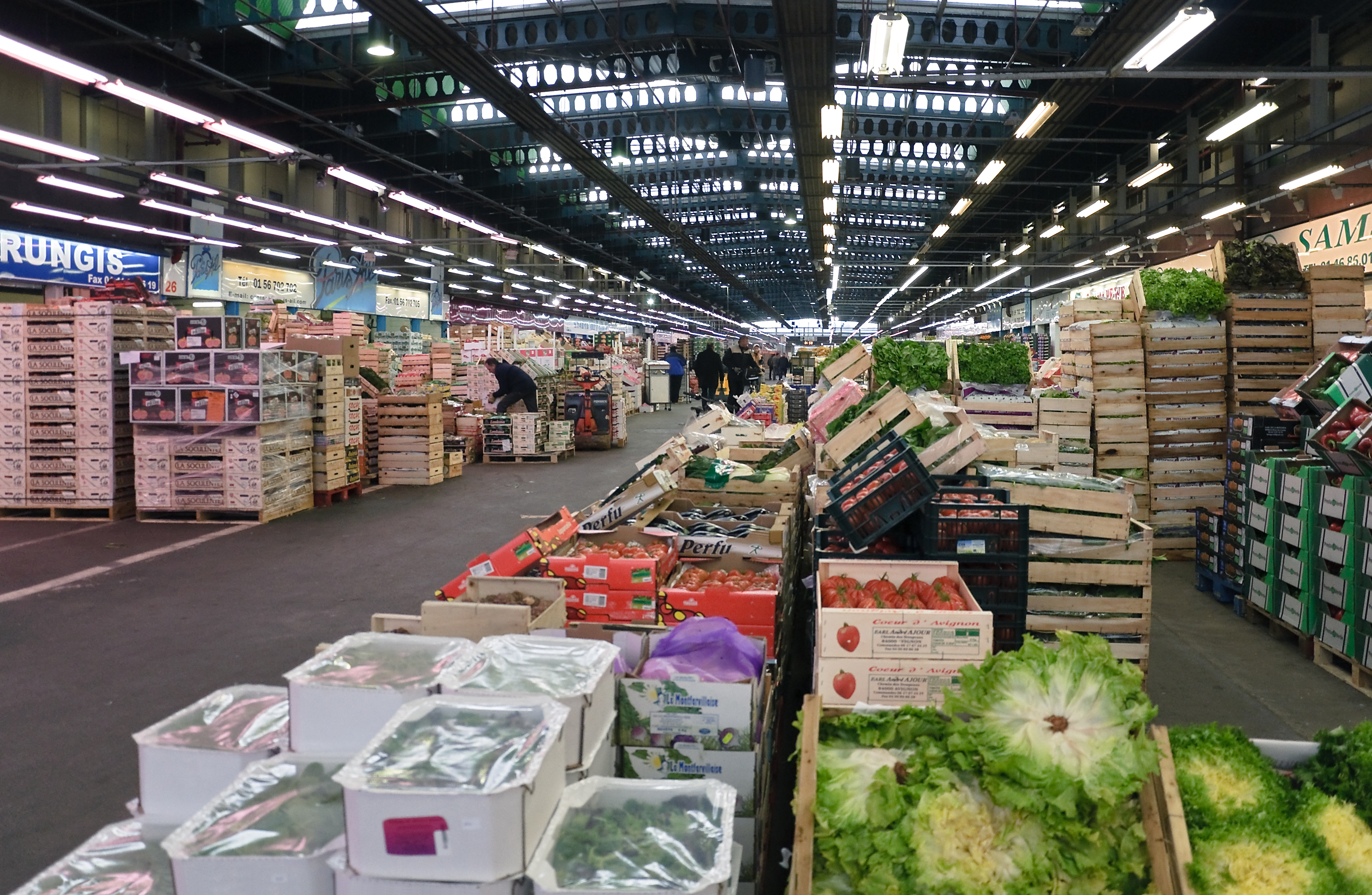
In the fruits and vegetables sector of the Rungis International Market, France.

The consumption and production of marketed food are spatially separated. Production is primarily in rural areas while consumption is mainly in urban areas. Agricultural marketing is the process that overcomes this separation, allowing produce to be moved from an area of surplus to one of need. Food reaches the consumer by a complex network, involving production, assembly, sorting, packing, reassembly, distribution and retail stages. In developing countries the linkage between the producer and the retailer is still usually provided by assembly and wholesale markets, where wholesale marketing takes place using a variety of transaction methods. Recent years have seen an expansion of wholesale marketing in European and former CIS countries. On the other hand, the growth of supermarkets in many regions has seen the development of direct marketing and a reduced role for wholesale systems.

== Types of wholesale market ==
Wholesale markets can either be primary, or terminal, markets, situated in or close to major conurbations, or secondary markets. The latter are generally found only in larger developing countries where they are located in district or regional cities, taking the bulk of their produce from rural assembly markets that are located in production areas. The distinction between rural assembly markets and secondary wholesale markets is that secondary wholesale markets are in permanent operation (rather than being seasonal in nature or dealing in specialized produce), larger volumes of produce are traded than at the rural assembly markets and specialized functions may be present, such as commission agents and brokers.

Terminal wholesale markets are located in major metropolitan areas, where produce is finally channeled to consumers through trade between wholesalers and retailers, caterers, etc. Produce may also be assembled for export. In some countries, such as India and China, terminal markets also supply other parts of the country. For example, New Delhi serves as a distribution centre to the south of India for apples grown in the Himalayan foothills. The problems of terminal wholesale markets are usually ones of congestion caused by an unsuitable location or by an inappropriate mixture of wholesale and retail functions. Traditionally, wholesale markets were built adjacent to city centres, located at a focal point of the inter-city transport facilities and close to the main retailing areas. Population growth, changes in urban land-use patterns and the development of modern transport systems have all influenced the suitability and functionality of existing sites.

== Transaction methods ==
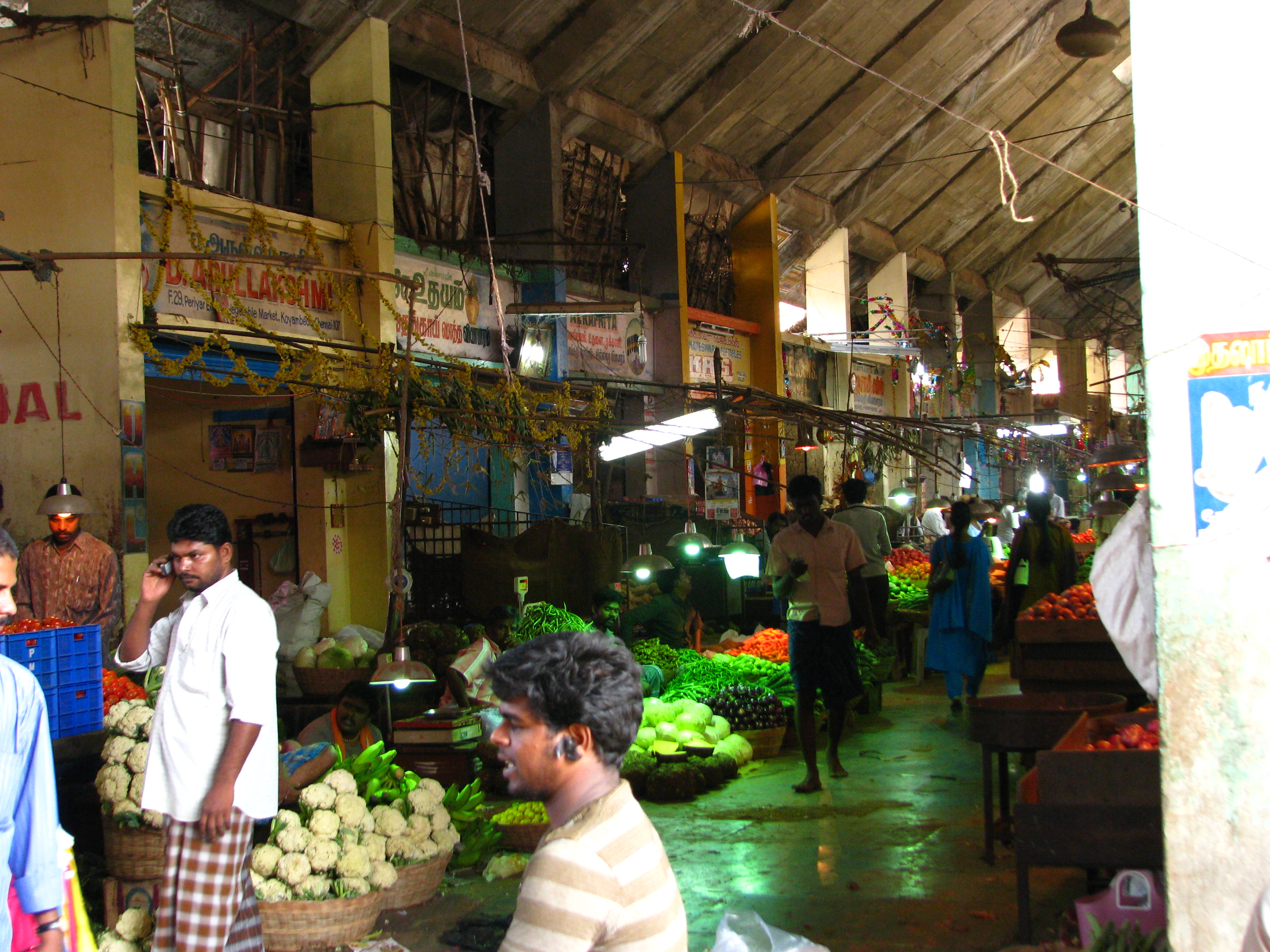
Wholesale vegetable market in India.

Wholesaling facilitates the economic function of buying and selling (usually termed as "price formation") by allowing the forces of supply and demand to converge to establish a single price for a commodity. The wholesaler may also perform storage and warehousing functions, as well as allowing economies of scale to be obtained in the transportation of produce from farm to market. The people involved in wholesaling can act simply as merchants, buying and selling produce, can be brokers dealing in orders rather than goods, or can be commission agents. Prices are normally established by negotiation but some wholesale markets use the auction system. The auction is compulsory in all wholesale markets in big cities in Japan. A comparison of the Japanese system with that in Brisbane, Australia, found that prices moved more frequently and with a greater degree of volatility in Japan than those at Brisbane.

== Wholesaling trends ==
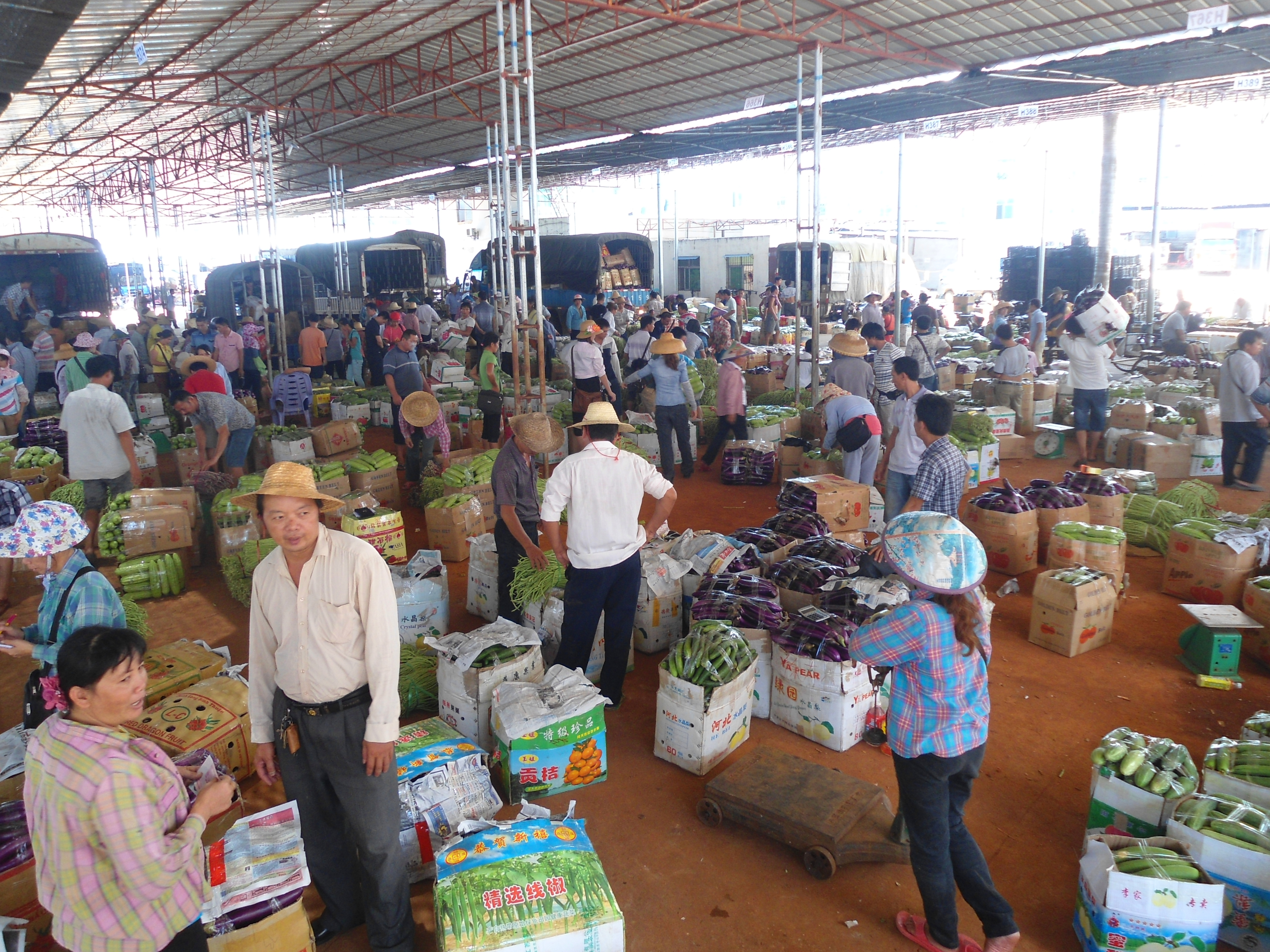
Haikou wholesale vegetable market, China.

Wholesale markets develop in a number of stages. They start as general markets, then become more specialized by trading in specific types of products. A later stage is to transact only graded and well-packaged produce. A recent trend in Western Europe and the USA is for large retailers to by-pass the wholesale market system. Direct links are created between producers and supermarket chains, often by means of contract farming arrangements or through the use of preferred suppliers. Following the collapse of the Iron Curtain a large number of markets were developed in Eastern and Central Europe in the 1990s and early 2000s. Examples include markets in Warsaw, Gdansk, Budapest, and Bucharest. In other parts of the world, new markets have been built in Amman, Cairo and Mumbai, among many recent developments. Very few new wholesale markets have been built in western countries in the last decades, although old markets have been relocated to new sites (e.g. the new Covent Garden Market relocated to Nine Elms in London and Rome's new wholesale market, relocated from the centre to the east of the city). Those that already exist have tended to also attract warehouses for integrated food distribution, changing their role to "food centers" (in the USA) and including other non-fresh food products. Wholesale markets still have a role in the marketing of horticultural produce but the traditional fresh meat and fish wholesale markets, particularly those dealing with wholesale live produce, are generally being closed down in major urban centres. In developing countries, changes in work patterns, particularly the employment of women, and the impact of technological innovations in post-harvest handling, food processing and storage, including the use of domestic refrigerators, tends to encourage the development of one-stop shopping at supermarkets, often on a once-a-week basis. The challenge for wholesale markets in such a trading environment is to retain turnover, both by providing new services to supermarkets and by developing services to the non-supermarket trade and the growing hotel and catering sectors.

== Representative bodies ==
The World Union of Wholesale Markets (WUWM) aims to represent wholesale markets internationally, and promote the exchange of information between them for mutual benefit.

== See also ==
- Food marketing
