= Market information systems =

Market information systems (otherwise known as market intelligence systems, market information services, or MIS, and not to be confused with management information systems) are information systems used in gathering, analyzing and disseminating information about prices and other information relevant to farmers, animal rearers, traders, processors and others involved in handling agricultural products. Market information systems play an important role in agro-industrialisation and food supply chains. With the advance of information and communication technologies for development (ICTs) in developing countries, the income- generation opportunities offered by market information systems have been sought by international development organizations, non-governmental organizations (NGOs) and businesses alike.

== Types of market information systems ==
There is a wide variety of market information systems or services. OECD countries have traditionally emphasised the importance of information provision for the agricultural sector, a notable example being the service provided by the United States Department of Agriculture (USDA). Such systems are widely used in order to increase the transparency and the volume of information flowing through the supply chains for different agricultural products. The ability of market information systems to provide a valuable service was strengthened with the development of the Internet and the advance of electronic commerce (business-to-business (B2B), consumer-to-consumer, etc.). Industry structure, product complexity and the demanding nature of agricultural transactions are considered determining factors for the development of B2B electronic commerce in agriculture.

== Agricultural market information in developing countries ==
In developing countries, market information initiatives are often part of broader interventions and part of the agricultural marketing and agribusiness development strategy that many governments are actively engaged in. It is commonly understood that long transaction chains, lack of transparency, lack of standards, and insufficient access to markets for products has perpetuated low incomes in predominantly agrarian economies. Early attempts at market information provision in developing countries involved government bodies in collecting price information, and arranging for this to be disseminated via newspapers and radio stations. The information provided was often not very accurate and usually reached farmers too late to be of practical use. Governments often attempted to cover far too many locations and many services either collapsed after initial donor assistance came to an end or managed to struggle along with little impact. Furthermore, it was soon recognised that it was not enough just to supply market information to farmers. They needed assistance in understanding how to use that information.

However, donor organizations, such as FAO, the IICD, USAID, DFID, and the Bill and Melinda Gates Foundation, remain committed to improving the efficiencies within the supply chain through greater information provision. The recent surge of mobile phone usage in developing countries has provided an opportunity for innovative projects to leverage this new distribution channel to get critical market data into the hands of farmers and traders, taking advantage of the SMS capacity of phones. Using the so-called "push" method recipients of information are identified on a database and automatically receive messages of relevance to them. Alternatively, the "pull" method enables farmers and traders to interrogate the database of the MIS. A farmer can send an SMS with the product and location he is interested in (e.g. tomatoes;Nairobi) and receive an immediate reply. Several projects by Reuters, Nokia, Esoko, KACE, Manobi, AgRisk and others have demonstrated the impact that such information can have, but the sustainability of such services has unfortunately been limited. Amongst donors there is a renewed interest in promoting regional trade, particularly in Africa, and market information is seen as an important way of achieving this. Examples of donor-supported services are RATIN for East Africa and RESIMAO for West Africa.

Nevertheless, it remains unclear whether MIS can be delivered on a profitable basis by the private sector, given the difficulty of fully covering costs, or on a sustainable basis by the public sector, given the latter's history of gathering inaccurate data and disseminating it badly. To try to address some of these problems, a new approach makes the buyers responsible for uploading the price information via SMS, and facilitates trade by creating a capacity for sellers to contact individual buyers. Others question whether formal systems are still necessary when farmers can just contact traders by phone. Work in Bangladesh, India, China and Vietnam found that 80% of farmers now own cell phones and they use these to speak to multiple traders about prices and demand and to conclude deals. A study in the Philippines found that farmers using cell phones reported improved relationships with their trading partners, possibly because the ability to compare prices made them trust their buyers more. Studies in Niger and India demonstrate the impact of cell phones in reducing price variations and creating greater equilibrium among markets. Introduction of internet kiosks and cafes that provide wholesale price information to farmers has been shown to enhance the functioning of rural markets by increasing the competitiveness of local traders in India.

== Supporting organizations ==
- FAO – Food and Agriculture Organization (UN), Rome
- IFAD – International Fund for Agricultural Development, Rome
- IICD – International Institute for Communication and Development
- MCA – Millenium Challenge Account
- CRS - Catholic Relief Services
- IITA – International Institute for Tropical Agriculture
- USAID – United States Agency for International Development
- DFID – UK's Department for International Development
- Bill and Melinda Gates Foundation
- CGIAR
- FARA – Forum for Agricultural Research in Africa, Accra.
- Grameen Foundation Seattle.
- International Development Research Centre (IDRC), Canada.
- MercyCorps
- Rockefeller Foundation
- United Nations Conference on Trade and Development (UNCTAD)
- CIHEAM – International Centre for Advanced Mediterranean Agronomic Studies

== Blogs and discussion groups ==
- Promoting Second Generation Market Information Services (MIS) in Developing Economies DGroup from CTA
- Mobiles in Agriculture Google Group from MobileActive08
- Mobile Market Design for Development Blog
- Aginfo News from IAALD – postings on market information systems
