= Esoko =

Agricultural profiling and messaging service

- Company type: Private
- Website type: Agricultural marketing service
- Available in: English, French, Portuguese, Swahili, Arabic
- Founded: Accra, Ghana
- Headquarters: Accra
- Employees: 65 (March 2011)
- Website: esoko.com
- Registration: optional, Subscriptions (Bronze, Silver, Gold)
- Launched: January 2007

Esoko is an online agricultural marketing and messaging service, based in Accra, Ghana.

== History ==
Esoko began as TradeNet in 2005 with the encouragement of the Food and Agriculture Organization of the United Nations, and in partnership with FoodNet in Uganda.

In 2005, TradeNet signed a three year agreement with USAID's MISTOWA program to adapt the product and make it available to their target beneficiaries (MISTOWA's mission was to increase regional trade in West Africa by 20%).

In April, 2009 TradeNet rebranded as Esoko, switching to a new platform with a broader set of tools. The name Esoko originated from the Swahili name "Soko", which means "market"; the 'e' represents 'electronic'. The eSoko name was also inspired by the eRwanda Project in Rwanda, where a messaging service comparable to eSoko is owned by the Ministry of Agriculture. In 2008, the eRwanda Project granted permission to TradeNet to use the name Esoko.

Currently Esoko is active in 16 countries through different partnership agreements; it is utilized by both public sector agricultural projects and Esoko country resellers and franchises.

== Investors ==
Investors in Esoko include Mark Davies (founder), Jim Forster, International Finance Corporation, and the Soros Economic Development Fund.

== Users ==
- Ghana
- Sudan
- Burkina Faso
- Nigeria
- Ivory Coast
- Mozambique
- Swaziland
- Madagascar
- Malawi
- Burundi
- Rwanda
- Tanzania
- Zambia
- Kenya
- Uganda
- Zimbabwe

== Partners ==
- TechnoServe
- USAID
- MTN
- GIZ
- Prestat
- NYU
- IFDC
- FAO
- IFAD
- Novus International
- AECOM
- IFPRI
