= Agricultural marketing =

Process of moving agricultural products from the farm to the consumer

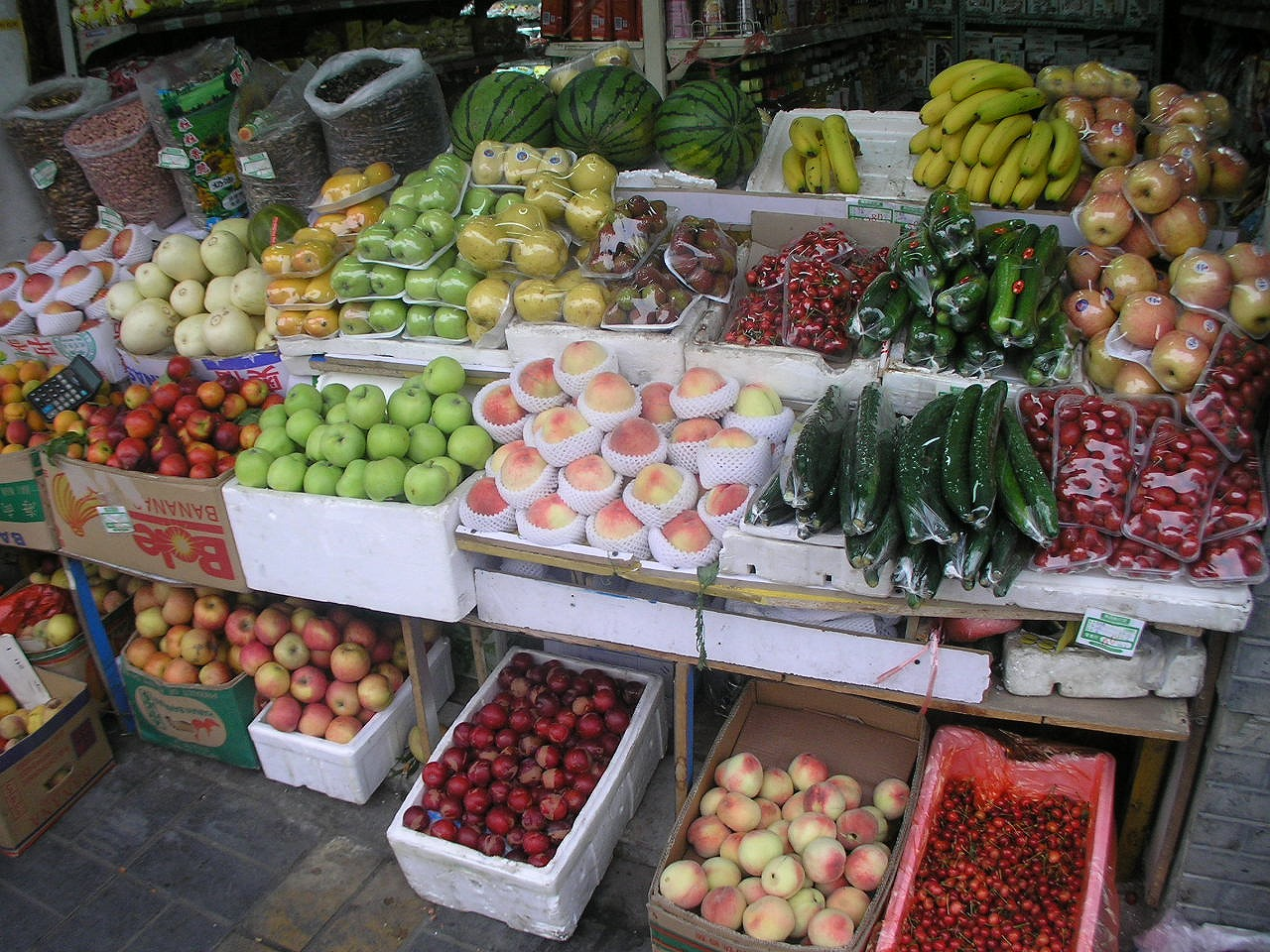
Market display in China

Agricultural marketing covers the services involved in moving an agricultural product from the farm to the consumer. These services involve the planning, organizing, directing and handling of agricultural produce in such a way as to satisfy farmers, intermediaries and consumers. Numerous interconnected activities are involved in doing this, such as planning production, growing and harvesting, grading, packing and packaging, transport, storage, agro- and food processing, provision of market information, distribution, advertising and sale. Effectively, the term encompasses the entire range of supply chain operations for agricultural products, whether conducted through ad hoc sales or through a more integrated chain, such as one involving contract farming.

== Agricultural marketing development ==
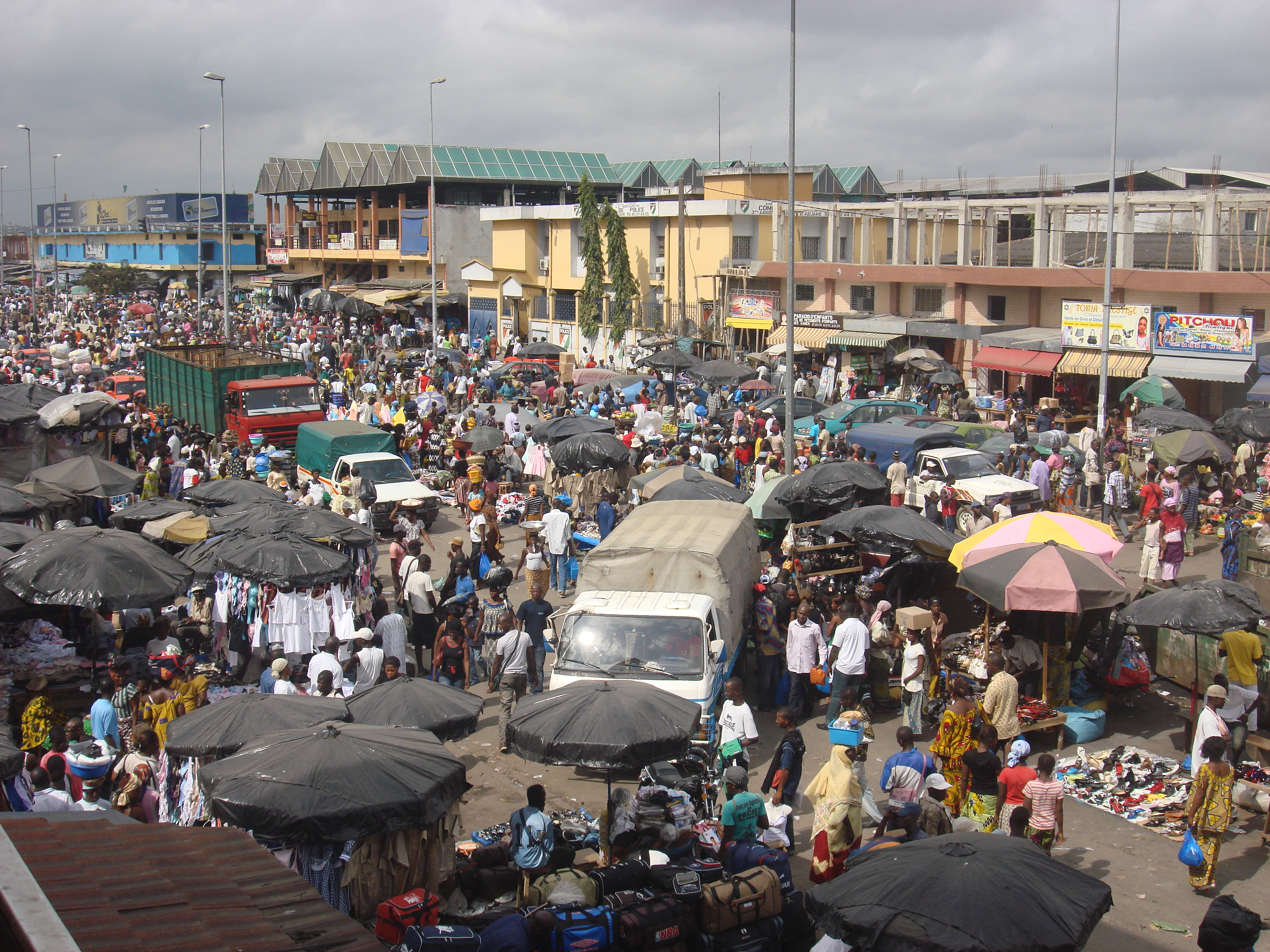
Congestion at a market in Abidjan

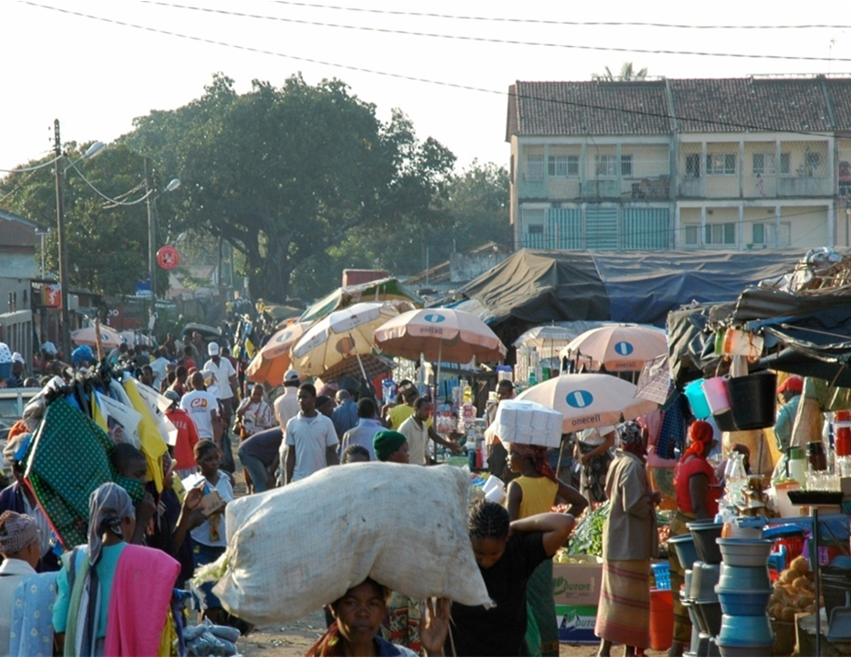
A typical market in Africa

Efforts to develop agricultural marketing have, particularly in developing countries, intended to concentrate on a number of areas, specifically infrastructure development; information provision; training of farmers and traders in marketing and post-harvest issues; and support to the development of an appropriate policy environment. In the past, efforts were made to develop government-run marketing bodies but these have tended to become less prominent over the years.

=== Agricultural market infrastructure ===
Efficient marketing infrastructure such as wholesale, retail and assembly markets and storage facilities is essential for cost-effective marketing, to minimize post-harvest losses and to reduce health risks. Markets play an important role in rural development, income generation, food security, and developing rural-market linkages. Experience shows that planners need to be aware of how to design markets that meet a community's social and economic needs and how to choose a suitable site for a new market. In many cases sites are chosen that are inappropriate and result in under-use or even no use of the infrastructure constructed. It is also not sufficient just to build a market: attention needs to be paid to how that market will be managed, operated and maintained.

Rural assembly markets are located in production areas and primarily serve as places where farmers can meet with traders to sell their products. These may be occasional (perhaps weekly) markets, such as haat bazaars in India and Nepal, or permanent. Terminal wholesale markets are located in major metropolitan areas, where produce is finally channeled to consumers through trade between wholesalers and retailers, caterers, etc. The characteristics of wholesale markets have changed considerably as retailing changes in response to urban growth, the increasing role of supermarkets and increased consumer spending capacity. These changes may require responses in the way in which traditional wholesale markets are organized and managed.

Retail marketing systems in western countries have broadly evolved from traditional street markets through to the modern hypermarket or out-of-town shopping center. In developing countries, there remains scope to improve agricultural marketing by constructing new retail markets, despite the growth of supermarkets, although municipalities often view markets primarily as sources of revenue rather than infrastructure requiring development. Effective regulation of markets is essential. Inside a market, both hygiene rules and revenue collection activities have to be enforced. Of equal importance, however, is the maintenance of order outside the market. Licensed traders in a market will not be willing to cooperate in raising standards if they face competition from unlicensed operators outside who do not pay any of the costs involved in providing a proper service.

=== Market information ===
Efficient market information can be shown to have positive benefits for farmers and traders. Up-to-date information on prices and other market factors enables farmers to negotiate with traders and also facilitates spatial distribution of products from rural areas to towns and between markets. Most governments in developing countries have tried to provide market information services to farmers, but these have tended to experience problems of sustainability. Moreover, even when they function, the service provided is often insufficient to allow commercial decisions to be made because of time lags between data collection and dissemination. Modern communications technologies open up the possibility for market information services to improve information delivery through SMS on cell phones and the rapid growth of FM radio stations in many developing countries offers the possibility of more localized information services. In the longer run, the internet may become an effective way of delivering information to farmers. However, problems associated with the cost and accuracy of data collection still remain to be addressed. Even when they have access to market information, farmers often require assistance in interpreting that information. For example, the market price quoted on the radio may refer to a wholesale selling price and farmers may have difficulty in translating this into a realistic price at their local assembly market. Various attempts have been made in developing countries to introduce commercial market information services but these have largely been targeted at traders, commercial farmers or exporters. It is not easy to see how small, poor farmers can generate sufficient income for a commercial service to be profitable although in India a service introduced by Thomson Reuters was reportedly used by over 100,000 farmers in its first year of operation. Esoko in West Africa attempts to subsidize the cost of such services to farmers by charging access to a more advanced feature set of mobile-based tools to businesses.

=== Marketing training ===
Farmers frequently consider marketing as being their major problem. However, while they are able to identify such problems as poor prices, lack of transport and high post-harvest losses, they are often poorly equipped to identify potential solutions. Successful marketing requires learning new skills, new techniques and new ways of obtaining information. Extension officers working with ministries of agriculture or NGOs are often well-trained in agricultural production techniques but usually lack knowledge of marketing or post-harvest handling.

=== Enabling environments ===
Agricultural marketing needs to be conducted within a supportive policy, legal, institutional, macro-economic, infrastructural and bureaucratic environment. Traders and others are generally reluctant to make investments in an uncertain policy climate, such as those that restrict imports and exports or internal produce movement. Businesses have difficulty functioning when their trading activities are hampered by excessive bureaucracy. Inappropriate law can distort and reduce the efficiency of the market, increase the costs of doing business and retard the development of a competitive private sector. Poor support institutions, such as agricultural extension services, municipalities that operate markets inefficiently and inadequate export promotion bodies, can be particularly damaging. Poor roads increase the cost of doing business, reduce payments to farmers and increase prices to consumers. Finally, corruption can increase the transaction costs faced by those in the marketing chain.

=== Agricultural marketing support ===
Most governments have at some stage made efforts to promote agricultural marketing improvements. In the United States the Agricultural Marketing Service (AMS) is a division of USDA and has programs that provide testing, support standardization and grading and offer market news services. AMS oversees marketing agreements and orders research and promotion programs. It also purchases commodities for federal food programs. USDA also provides support to agricultural marketing work at various universities. In the United Kingdom, support for marketing of some commodities was provided before and after the Second World War by boards such as the Milk Marketing Board and the Egg Marketing Board. These boards were closed down in the 1970s. As a colonial power, Britain established marketing boards in many countries, particularly in Africa. Some continue to exist although many were closed at the time of the introduction of structural adjustment measures in the 1990s.

Several developing countries have established government-sponsored marketing or agribusiness units. South Africa, for example, started the National Agricultural Marketing Council (NAMC), as a response to the deregulation of the agriculture industry and closure of marketing boards in the country. India has the long-established National Institute of Agricultural Marketing. These are primarily research and policy organizations, but other agencies provide facilitating services for marketing channels, such as the provision of infrastructure, market information and documentation support. Examples from the Caribbean include the National Agricultural Marketing Development Corporation, in Trinidad and Tobago and the New Guyana Marketing Corporation in Guyana.

=== Recent developments ===
New marketing linkages between agribusiness, large retailers and farmers are gradually being developed, e.g. through contract farming, group marketing and other forms of collective action. Donors and NGOs are paying increasing attention to ways of promoting direct linkages between farmers and buyers within a value chain context. More attention is now being paid to the development of regional markets (e.g. East Africa) and to structured trading systems that should facilitate such developments. The growth of supermarkets, particularly in Latin America and East and South East Asia, is having a significant impact on marketing channels for horticultural, dairy and livestock products. Nevertheless, "spot" markets will continue to be important for many years, necessitating attention to infrastructure improvement such as for retail and wholesale markets.

== See also ==
- Agricultural value chain
- Food marketing
- Wholesale marketing of food
