= Elizabeth Cox (humanitarian) =

Australian community development specialist

- Born: Australia
- Other name: Sabet Cox
- Education: University of Melbourne
- Occupation: Community development specialist
- Known for: Development work in Papua New Guinea and other Pacific countries

Elizabeth (Sabet) Cox is an Australian national who has lived and worked in the East Sepik Province of Papua New Guinea (PNG) for four decades. Together with others, she founded HELP-Resources, an NGO with a focus on rural and grassroots communities, in 1998. She later became Pacific Regional Director of UN Women.

== Early life ==
Elizabeth Cox, commonly known as "Sabet", obtained an undergraduate degree from the University of Melbourne, Australia in social psychology and social work in 1972. She moved to PNG in 1973. In 1983, she obtained a Master's from the International Institute of Social Studies of Erasmus University Rotterdam with a thesis entitled "Women Oppressed - Women Organised in Planned Rural Resettlement Schemes". Resettlement schemes have involved the relocation of people from the Highlands Region of PNG to coastal and island areas in order to work on nucleus estates for oil palm.

== Work in PNG ==
Cox was initially based in the Angoram District of the East Sepik Province, where she stayed for 20 years. She later moved to Wewak, the provincial capital of East Sepik. Her work involved promoting community development, both in East Sepik Province and in other areas of PNG, most notably the Highlands. Areas of work in which she has been involved include combatting HIV/AIDS, discouraging teenage pregnancies, and addressing drug and alcohol problems. She has also worked for UNICEF and Save the Children in Papua New Guinea. More recently, she has worked to improve the status and conditions of women vendors and the governance of municipal markets across Melanesia. She has also collaborated with the United Nations Research Institute for Social Development (UNRISD) on a project entitled "Mobilizing Revenues from Extractive Industries: Protecting and Promoting Children’s Rights and Well-Being in Resource-Rich Countries".

In 1998, Cox and others developed the NGO, HELP-Resources. HELP is an acronym for Health, Education, Livelihood and Participation and the NGO now works across PNG and in the Pacific. In 2006, she moved to Suva in Fiji as Pacific Women Program Director for UN Women, staying there until 2012 before returning to PNG to develop toolkits and provide training on Violence against women issues in the Jiwaka and Hela provinces. She also provides online mentoring to development practitioners in PNG.

== Awards and honours ==
- Cox was awarded a PNG Independence Medal in 2000 on the 25th Anniversary of the country's Independence and again in 2005 on the 30th Anniversary.
