= Novus International =

American animal health and nutrition company

Novus International, Inc.
- Founded: St. Louis, Missouri (1991)
- Headquarters: St. Charles, Missouri, USA
- Website: www.novusint.com

Novus International, Inc. is an American animal health and nutrition company headquartered in St. Charles, Missouri. Novus is privately owned by Mitsui & Co. and Nippon Soda Co., Ltd. and operates in over 90 countries. Novus' products include amino acids, organic trace minerals, feed preservatives, and various health and nutrition products. Its customers include animal nutritionists, veterinarians, and individual animal owners.

== History ==
Early 1950s – Monsanto begins metabolism studies and developing methionine hydroxy analogue (MHA® feed supplement) production begins at Monsanto's Everett, Massachusetts location.
1954 – MHA® project moves to Monsanto's St. Louis research center and gets additional support.
1959 – SANTOQUIN is the first feed additive approved by the FDA.
1979 – ALIMET® introduced. The first sale of ALIMET feed supplement is made to ConAgra Foods in El Dorado, Arkansas.
1991 – Mitsui & Co. and Nippon Soda acquire Monsanto's MHA and ALIMET businesses and form Novus International, Inc.
1992 – Novus enters into a contractual joint venture with Monsanto for SANTOQUIN®, a feed preservative.

1993 – The Novus Research Center completed and occupied at Missouri Research Park in St. Charles, Missouri.
1996 – Novus launches its aquaculture business.

2007 – Novus hosts the first Sustainability Round-table discussion in St. Louis, Missouri. Arenus, a division of Novus Nutrition Brands, LLC (a Novus International Company) is formed.
2008 – Novus completes global headquarters in Missouri Research Park, St. Charles, Missouri.

2009 – Stratum Nutrition becomes a division of Novus Nutrition Brands, LLC, a subsidiary of Novus International, Inc., leveraging the Novus core competencies in nutritional research and innovation. Novus augments Novus Graduate Scholars program, initiated in China, and enters into a 5-year agreement with the African Women in Agricultural Research and Development (AWARD) Program as the first, private-sector partner.

2010 – Novus inaugurates a new research facility in Montgomery City, Missouri, USA: Green Acres Farm. Novus joins the Sustainable Sites Initiative, a set of guidelines which aims to promote sustainable land development and management practices.
2011 – Novus and Verenium announce strategic partnership to expand enzyme solutions to the animal nutrition market.

2013 – Novus CEO Thad Simons is elected to lead Board of International Food and Agribusiness Management Association (IFAMA).

2014 – Novus board names François Fraudeau as President and CEO.

2015 – Novus secures Methylmercaptopropanal (MMP) plant from Union Carbide Corporation, a subsidiary of the Dow Chemical Company, in St. Charles Parish, Louisiana. Novus receives 2015 Internationalization Award.

The company operates in several industries which include: poultry, pork, dairy, beef, aquaculture, and companion animal.
