= Contract farming =

Agricultural production involving prior agreement between buyer and producer

Contract farming involves agricultural production being carried out on the basis of an agreement between the buyer and farm producers. Sometimes it involves the buyer specifying the quality required and the price, with the farmer agreeing to deliver at a future date. More commonly, however, contracts outline conditions for the production of farm products and for their delivery to the buyer's premises. The farmer undertakes to supply agreed quantities of a crop or livestock product, based on the quality standards and delivery requirements of the purchaser. In return, the buyer, usually a company, agrees to buy the product, often at a price that is established in advance. The company often also agrees to support the farmer through, e.g., supplying inputs, assisting with land preparation, providing production advice and transporting produce to its premises. The term "outgrower scheme" is sometimes used synonymously with contract farming, most commonly in Eastern and Southern Africa. Contract farming can be used for many agricultural products, although in developing countries it is less common for staple crops such as rice and maize.

== Key benefits ==
Contract farming has been used for agricultural production for decades but its popularity appears to have been increasing in recent years. The use of contracts has become attractive to many farmers because the arrangement can offer both an assured market and access to production support. Contract farming is also of interest to buyers, who seek supplies of products for sale further along the value chain or for processing. Processors constitute the main users of contracts, as the guaranteed supply enables them to maximise utilization of their processing capacity. Contracts with farmers can also reduce risk from disease or weather and facilitate certification, which is being increasingly demanded by advanced markets. There are also potential benefits for national economies as contract farming leads to economies of scale, which, as Collier and Dercon argue, are "bound to provide for a more dynamic agricultural sector.

Although contract farming must first and foremost be considered as a commercial proposition, it has also come to be viewed as an effective approach to help solve many of the market access and input supply problems faced by small farmers. A guide published by GIZ in 2013 seeks to advise on ways in which contract farming can be developed to maximise such benefits for smallholders in developing countries. Effective linkages between companies and thousands of farmers often require the involvement of formal farmer associations or cooperatives or, at least, informal farmer groups. However, empirical evidence of the best way of achieving this is not yet available.

== Types ==
Eaton and Shepherd identify five different contract farming models. Under the centralized model a company provides support to smallholder production, purchases the crop, and then processes or markets it, closely controlling its quality. This model is used for crops such as tobacco, cotton, sugar cane, banana, tea, and rubber. Under the Nucleus Estate model, the company also manages a plantation in order to supplement smallholder production and provide minimum throughput for the processing plant. This approach is mainly used for tree crops such as oil palm and rubber. The Multipartite model usually involves a partnership between government bodies, private companies and farmers. At a lower level of sophistication, the Intermediary model can involve subcontracting by companies to intermediaries, who either have formal arrangements with farmers, such as cooperatives, or less-formal arrangements, such as traders. Finally, the Informal model involves small and medium enterprises who make simple contracts with farmers on a seasonal basis. Although these are usually just seasonal arrangements they are often repeated annually and usually rely for their success on the proximity of the buyer to the seller.

== Issues of concern ==
As with any contract, there are a number of risks associated with contract farming. Common problems include farmers selling to a buyer other than the one with whom they hold a contract (known as side selling, extra-contractual marketing or, in the Philippines, “pole vaulting”), or using inputs supplied by the company for purposes other than intended. From the other side, a company sometimes fails to buy products at the agreed prices or in the agreed quantities, or arbitrarily downgrades produce quality.

The existence of an adequate legal framework is thus crucial for the successful implementation and long-term sustainability of contract farming operations. A system of law is essential to assist farmers and their buyers in the negotiation and drafting of contracts. It is also important to protect them from risks that may occur during contractual execution, such as abuse of power by the stronger bargaining party or breach of contract. Strengthening farmer organizations to improve their contract negotiating skills can redress the potential for subsequent misunderstandings. Different countries have enacted policies and legislation to ensure fair contractual practices and offer remedies for dispute resolution. A “Legal Guide on Contract Farming” was developed in 2013–15 by the International Institute for the Unification of Private Law (UNIDROIT) in partnership with FAO.

Even apparently successful contracts from a legal point of view can face other difficulties. For example, family relationships can be threatened. Work for contracts is often done by women but the contracts are invariably in the name of the man who also receives the payment. Men attend meetings and training courses but women often get no training. Land used by women for food crops or commercial production may be taken over for contract production. This can affect not only food production but also the status of the women. Contracts can break down because of poor management by the company or as a result of unrealistic expectations about the capacity of farmers or about the yields that can be achieved. This has been a particular problem with attempts to promote contract farming for biofuel crops.

== Maximising the chances of success ==
Contract farming has to be commercially viable. To maximise profitability companies need to choose the best available farmers. Once suitable farmers have been identified it is then necessary to develop trust, as contracts will only work when both parties believe they are better off by engaging in them. To achieve this requires a willingness to collaborate and share information. Disagreements over product grading, for example, can be avoided by providing clear, simple specifications in a contract and by ensuring that farmers or their representatives are present when the produce is graded. Late payment can immediately cause a breakdown of trust and must be avoided. Contracts should be flexible to take into account the possibility of extreme events such as high open market prices or bad weather. Finally, however hard the parties try, disagreements are inevitable. Contracts should ideally make provision for arbitration by someone acceptable to both the company and the farmers. FAO's Guiding Principle for Responsible Contract Farming Operations provides concise advice on how to maximise the chances of success for both companies and farmers. Of particular importance here is the role of producer organisations in bargaining for smallholders' interests.

== Studies ==
Numerous studies have been conducted on contract farming ventures and many are listed in the Food and Agriculture Organization's (FAO) Contract Farming Resource Centre. The Asian Development Bank Institute (ADBI) in Tokyo has conducted a series of case studies in selected Asian countries to assess the conditions for benefits to be achieved by marginal rice farmers. In Lao PDR, the research suggested that contracted farmers earned significantly higher profits than non-contracted farmers. This facilitated the transition of subsistence farmers to commercial agriculture, offering potential to reduce rural poverty. A study in Cambodia on organic rice for export assessed the effect of contract farming on farmers’ performance. This suggested that younger and more educated farmers with larger families and fewer assets were more likely to join the contract. However, farmers with access to good road communications often left the contract, indicating that contract farming had helped them to develop into independent farmers. In India, a 2023 study by the Asian Development Bank showed that contract poultry farming boosted the livelihoods of small-scale farmers producing for one of India's largest poultry producers. Contract poultry farming reduced the farmers' exposure to risks associated with price fluctuations, disease outbreaks, and feed price hikes. The study also provided evidence that contract farming with multinational companies could improve the livelihood of low- income segments.

A set of papers on the role of contract farming in promoting inclusive market access, published by FAO in 2013, covered contractual arrangements in Argentina, Bangladesh, Brazil, China, Honduras, South Africa, Tanzania and Thailand. The editors concluded that despite a preference for procurement from large farmers, factors other than farm size contribute to a company's decision and that contract farming would not, therefore, necessarily lead to the exclusion of small farmers from supply chains. Geographical factors were important, both in terms of how they impacted on production and in terms of factors such as land rights, gender and ethnic relationships. The editors identified a gradual convergence in clauses and conditions used in contracts and noted that the two most common contract provisions, those involving technical assistance and pre-financing of inputs, may be essential for small farmer inclusion. The publication considered the role of third parties, such as NGOs, in coordinating farmers. The editors also identified potential roles for third parties in providing independent quality certification and in certifying contracting companies in order to reduce the risk for farmers.

In considering the subject of “side selling” the FAO publication advocated a combination of favourable incentives and explicit penalties for farmers. It also noted that in some circumstances the costs of full avoidance of contractual breaches could be much greater than losses from side-selling, and that companies may therefore learn to live with side-selling. This would depend on the size of the firm and the amount invested in farmers. Drawing in detail from the case studies, the publication reiterated the importance of a suitable enabling environment. However, it also concluded that in certain cases the lack of such an environment is not necessarily a binding constraint to contract farming, particularly where flexibility and non-conventional contractual clauses can be used. Although an enabling environment is important, the editors cautioned against government incentives and subsidies to promote inclusion as these could give a misleading impression of profitability and jeopardize sustainability. They also noted that the costs to the firm of pursuing an inclusive strategy were rarely considered by proponents of the concept.

Prowse (2012) provided a comprehensive review of issues in contract farming in developing countries. Several studies offered a positive message on the inclusion of smallholders and the benefits they accrued from participation. For example, in a study published in 2014, Wang, Wang and Delgado review a large number of empirical studies of contract farming. They concluded that contract farming had had a significant impact on improving farm efficiency and productivity, and farmer incomes. In a synthetic review of econometric studies, Minot and Ronchi (2015) suggested that participants’ incomes increased by 25-75%. A more measured approach was taken in Ton et al.'s (2017) systematic review of contract farming. Although their study found that contract farming could substantially increase farmer income, Ton et al. argued that such figures needed to take publication and survivor bias into account. In other words, studies that showed negative or no 'impact' were less likely to be published, and the calculation of the impact of contract farming may neglect schemes that do not improve incomes for smallholders or that collapsed and were thus are not available for evaluation.

== Alternative contractual models ==
To avoid making large investments in farm equipment, farmers often hire the services of contractors to carry out activities such as land preparation, seeding, fertilization and harvesting. An alternative approach involves an agreement, or joint venture, between a landowner or tenant and a contractor to farm an area of land. As implemented in the United Kingdom, this model is based on a contractor carrying out all farming activities, receiving a fixed fee to cover its costs, together with a share of the eventual profits. The advantages of this arrangement for farmers should include lower labour and machinery costs, as contractors working on several farms can benefit from economies of scale denied to individual farmers. The profit-sharing nature of the agreement should also incentivise the contractor to be as efficient as possible. For contractors, the advantages are that they can farm large areas of land without having to buy it or enter into tenancy agreements. Contractors should also benefit from economies of scale by spreading machinery and labour over a larger area of land.

== Popular culture ==
A 2015 episode of the US television show Last Week Tonight with John Oliver documented contract farming for poultry in the US, arguing that many of the farmers were below the poverty line.

== See also ==
- Agriculture
- Agricultural Marketing
- Agricultural value chain
- Agribusiness
- Food systems
- Food quality
