= Nucleus estate and smallholder =

Farming system

Nucleus estate and smallholder (NES) is a farming system for commodity crops, often oil palm, practised in different world regions. It is most famous today for its application in the palm oil sector in Indonesia. The nucleus is the part of such a plantation that is under concession and management of the company, while another part of the plantation is operated by smallholders typically on their own land but planted by the company. NES farming is a particular form of contract farming.

== Origins ==
The system was first implemented by Commonwealth Development Corporation in the 1950s in various African countries.

== System ==
Smallholders work on their own farms usually organized in farmers' cooperatives and are contractually bound to the company. In Indonesia the price for fresh fruit bunches (FFB) in this scheme is set by the government.

The motivation for this kind of organizational and contractual arrangement is mainly that the initial investments to establish a plantation is considerable. Clearing land, building roads, and planting trees on sizeable areas requires not only elevated economic power but also technical skills. This part, therefore, is in the company's responsibility while the costs are later deducted from the payments made to the farmers.

Smallholders can benefit from the arrangement through technological transfers. Not only in the establishment of the plantation does the company play an important role. Also during operations, the company usually provides inputs such as fertilizer and pesticides to the smallholders. Often smallholders have additional independent oil palm farms where they can apply their newly acquired skills.

== Country cases ==
=== Indonesia ===
==== History ====
The scheme has a long history in Indonesia, where it is commonly known as Inti-Plasma farming, Inti being the nucleus and plasma the smallholdings. It has been implemented in different ways since 1978. The first model was called PIR Lokal (Perkebunan Inti Rakyat Lokal) and was designed for local populations. In later forms, NES was designed to settle transmigrants on the so called outer islands of Indonesia (i.e. outside of Java and Madura). This form of inti-plasma is called PIR Trans which stands for Perkebunan Inti Rakyat Transmigrasi, i.e. Nucleus Estate Smallholders Project for Transmigrants. Construction of health treatment facilities and public facilities such as roads, schools, houses of worship, clinics, and other projects were at times part of the PIR scheme. Another, more recent form of the system, started in the 1990s and is called KKPA. It stands for Kredit Koperasi Primer Anggota, i.e. Credit for Cooperative Primary Members and is not attached to the transmigration program. Recently, in the wake of decentralization and neo-liberal reforms, the kemitraan (partnership) scheme is shifting away from NES mechanics. Smallholders typically do no longer work on their land but receive dividends from their plantation part. This has shown to be very disadvantageous for the 'smallholders' involved in comparison with early days PIR schemes.

==== Cultural issues ====
A significant difference in how transmigrants and indigenous populations were treated is in how their own land was considered. Part of the transmigration program was to give resettled families two to four hectares of land for their own cultivation. However, indigenous populations willing to participate in such a scheme, had to give away parts of their land to become both inti and plasma oil palm farms. Such arrangements depend on the individual negotiation between village communities and oil palm companies and most commonly result in deals wherein 80% of the land becomes core plantation (inti) and 20% plasma.

==== Prevalence ====
In 2013, smallholders (not only plasma) were farming around 3.5 million ha of oil palm plantations or 39.5 percent of the plantation areas at that time.

=== Malaysia ===
Oil palm and rubber production schemes in Malaysia are no NES schemes, strictly speaking. Nevertheless they show similarities. These are managed smallholder schemes and joint-venture schemes. FELDA, the Malaysian Federal Land Development Authority, implemented settlements with managed smallholders. These do not have a nucleus but are strictly controlled by the FELDA management. FELCRA and SALCRA, the Federal and the Sarawak Land Consolidation and Rehabilitation Authorities followed similar approaches, yet focussing on local populations, not on resettlements.

=== Ghana ===
Having a long history of smallholders producing palm oil for domestic consumption (cooking oil, soap etc.), in the 2000s it started implementing nucleus estate and smallholder schemes. However, independent smallholders continue to produce the vast majority of palm oil in the West African nation.

== See also ==
- Palm oil production in Indonesia
