= Agribusiness =

Term used in agriculture and business

Agribusiness is the industry, enterprises, and the field of study of value chains in agriculture and in the bio-economy, in which case it is also called bio-business or bio-enterprise. The primary goal of agribusiness is to maximize profit while satisfying the needs of consumers for products related to natural resources. Agribusinesses comprise farms, food and fiber processing, forestry, fisheries, biotechnology and biofuel enterprises and their input suppliers.

Studies of business growth and performance in farming have found that successful agricultural businesses are cost-efficient internally and operate in favourable economic, political, and physical-organic environments. They are able to expand and make profits, improve the productivity of land, labor, and capital, and keep their costs down to ensure market price competitiveness.

Agribusiness is not limited to farming. It encompasses a broader spectrum through the agribusiness system which includes input supplies, value-addition, marketing, entrepreneurship, microfinancing, and agricultural extension.

In some countries like the Philippines, creation and management of agribusiness enterprises require consultation with registered agriculturists above a certain level of operations, capitalization, land area, or number of animals in the farm.

== Evolution of the agribusiness concept ==
The word "agribusiness" is a portmanteau of the words agriculture and business. The earliest known use of the word was in the Volume 155 of the Canadian Almanac & Directory published in 1847. Although most practitioners recognize that it was coined in 1957 by two Harvard Business School professors, John Davis and Ray Goldberg after they published the book "A Concept of Agribusiness."

"Agribusiness is the sum total of all operations involved in the manufacture and distribution of farm supplies; production operations on the farm; and the storage, processing, and distribution of farm commodities and items made from them." (Davis and Goldberg, 1956)

Their book argued against the New Deal programs of then U.S. President Franklin Roosevelt as it led to the increase in agricultural prices. Davis and Goldberg favored corporate-driven agriculture or large-scale farming to revolutionize the agriculture sector, lessening the dependency on state power and politics. They explained in the book that vertically integrated firms within the agricultural value chains have the ability to control prices and where they are distributed. Goldberg then assisted in the establishment of the first undergraduate program in agribusiness in 1966 at the UP College of Agriculture in Los Baños, Philippines as Bachelor of Science in Agriculture major in Agribusiness. The program was initially a joint undertaking with the UP College of Business Administration in Diliman, Quezon City until 1975. Jose D. Drilon of the University of the Philippines then published the book "Agribusiness Management Resource Materials" (1971) which would be the foundation of current agribusiness programs around the world. In 1973, Drilon and Goldberg further expanded the concept of agribusiness to include support organizations such as governments, research institutions, schools, financial institutions, and cooperatives within the integrated Agribusiness System.

Mark R. Edwards and Clifford J. Shultz II (2005) of Loyola University Chicago reframed the definition of agribusiness to emphasize its lack of focus on farm production but towards market centricity and innovative approach to serve consumers worldwide.

"Agribusiness is a dynamic and systemic endeavor that serves consumers globally and locally through innovation and management of multiple value chains that deliver valued goods and services derived from sustainable orchestration of food, fiber and natural resources." (Edwards and Shultz, 2005)

In 2012, Thomas L. Sporleder and Michael A. Boland defined the unique economic characteristics of agribusiness supply chains from industrial manufacturing and service supply chains. They have identified seven main characteristics:

1. Risks emanating from the biological nature of agrifood supply chains
2. The role of buffer stocks within the supply chain
3. The scientific foundation of innovation in production agriculture having shifted from chemistry to biology
4. Cyberspace and information technology influences on agrifood supply chains
5. The prevalent market structure at the farm gate remains oligopsony
6. Relative market power shifts in agrifood supply chains away from food manufacturers downstream to food retailers
7. Globalization of agriculture and agrifood supply chains

In 2017, noting the rise of genetic engineering and biotechnology in agriculture, Goldberg further expanded the definition of agribusiness which covers all the interdependent aspects of the food system including medicine, nutrition, and health. He also emphasized the responsibility of agribusiness to be environmentally and socially conscious towards sustainability.

"Agribusiness is the interrelated and interdependent industries in agriculture that supply, process, distribute, and support the products of agriculture." (Goldberg, 2017)

Some agribusinesses have adopted the triple bottom line framework such as aligning for fair trade, organic, good agricultural practices, and B-corporation certifications towards the concept of social entrepreneurship.

== Agribusiness system ==
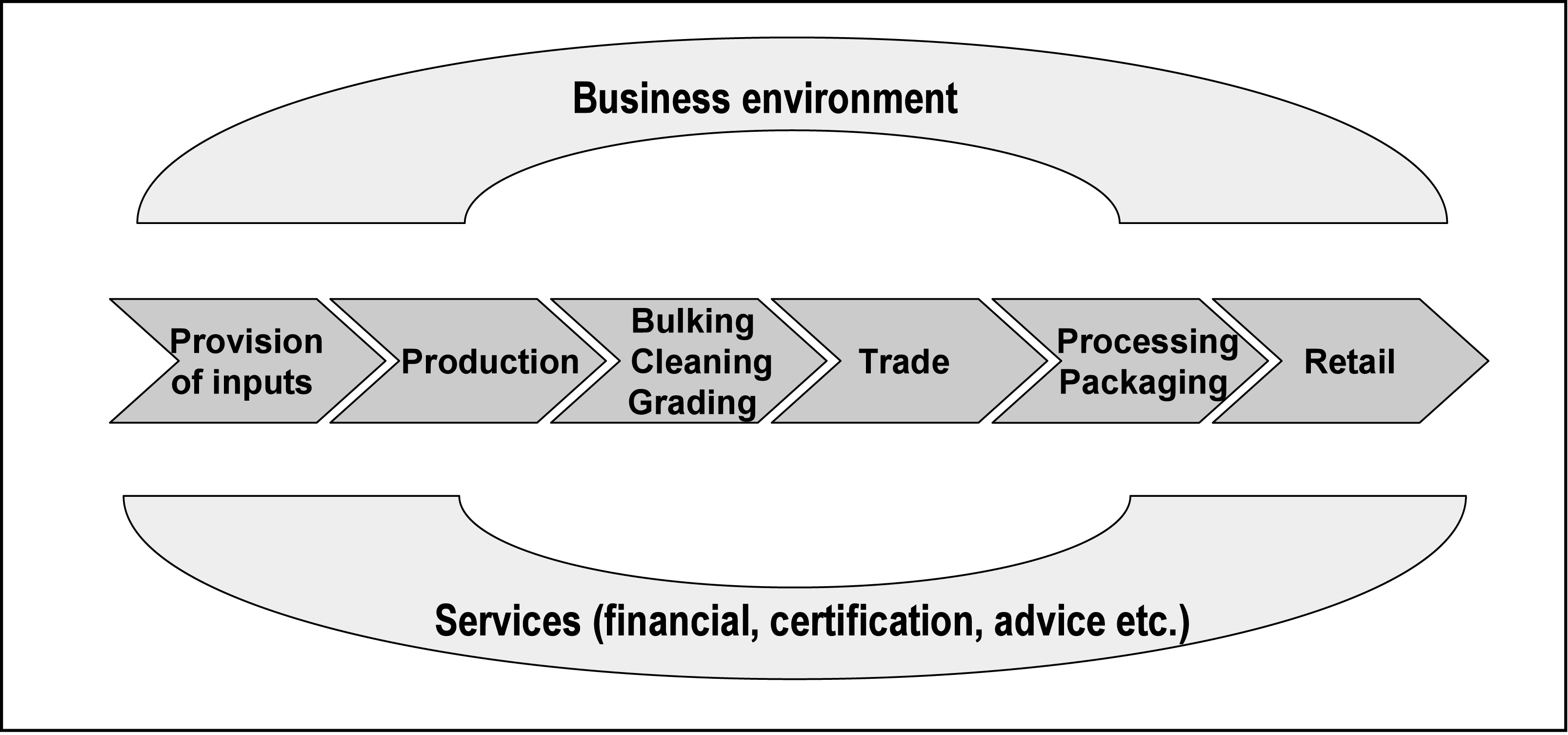
Value chain representation

The term value chain was first popularized in a book published in 1985 by Michael Porter, who used it to illustrate how companies could achieve what he called "competitive advantage" by adding value within their organization. Subsequently, the term was adopted for agricultural development purposes and has now become very much in vogue among those working in this field, with most bilateral and multilateral aid organisations using it to guide their development interventions.

At the heart of the agricultural value chain concept is the idea of actors connected along a chain producing and delivering goods to consumers through a sequence of activities. However, this "vertical" chain cannot function in isolation and an important aspect of the value chain approach is that it also considers "horizontal" impacts on the chain, such as input and finance provision, extension support and the general enabling environment. The approach has been found useful, particularly by donors, in that it has resulted in a consideration of all those factors impacting on the ability of farmers to access markets profitably, leading to a broader range of chain interventions. It is used both for upgrading existing chains and for donors to identify market opportunities for small farmers.

=== Inputs sector ===
==== Agricultural supplies (1) ====
An agricultural supply store or agrocenter is an agriculturally-oriented shop where one sells agricultural supplies — inputs required for agricultural production such as pesticides, feed and fertilizers . Sometimes these stores are organized as cooperatives, where store customers aggregate their resources to purchase agricultural inputs. Agricultural supply and the stores that provide it are part of the larger Agribusiness industry.

==== Agricultural labor (2) ====
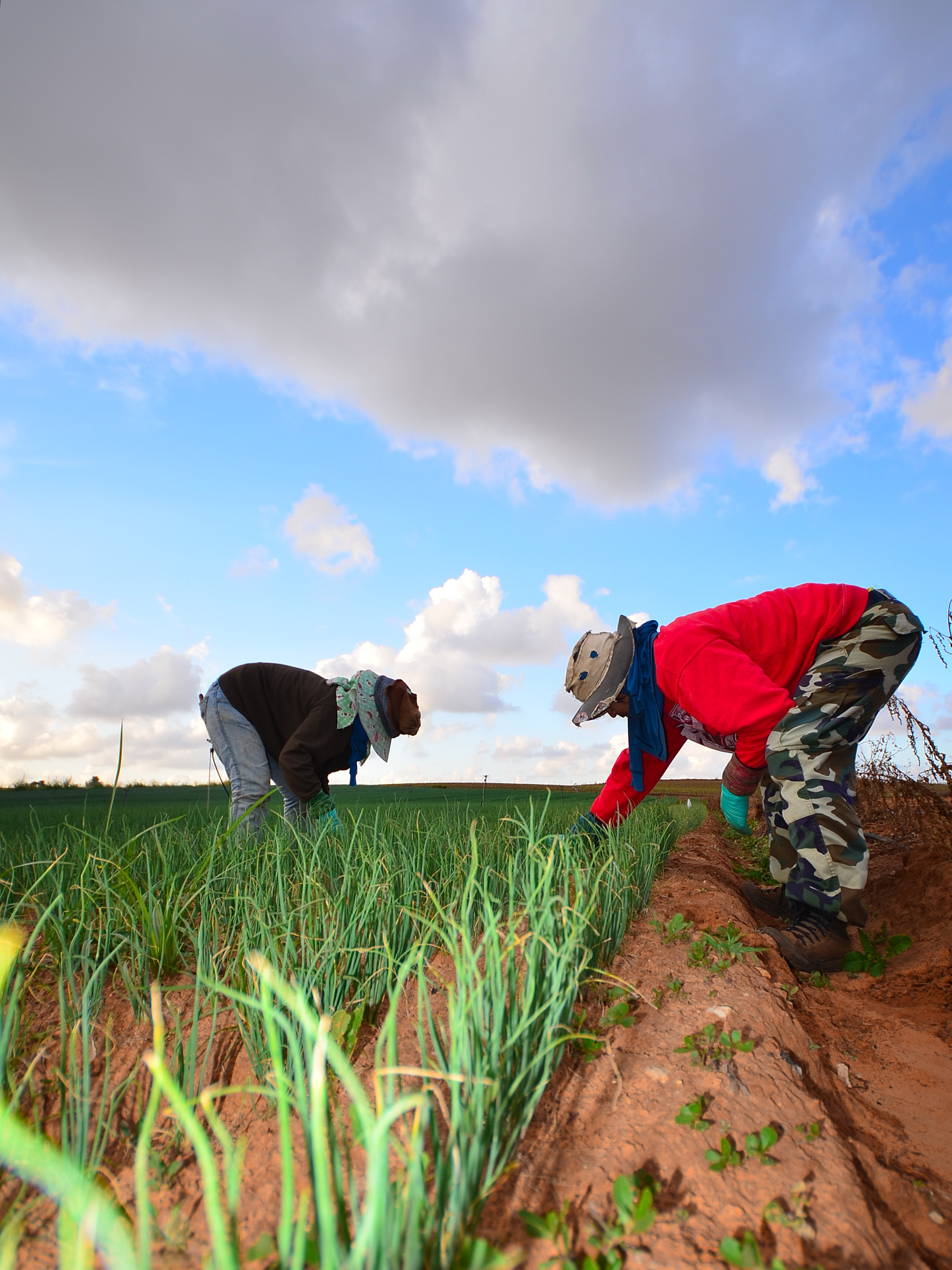
Two farm workers cleaning and picking at an onion field, location unknown

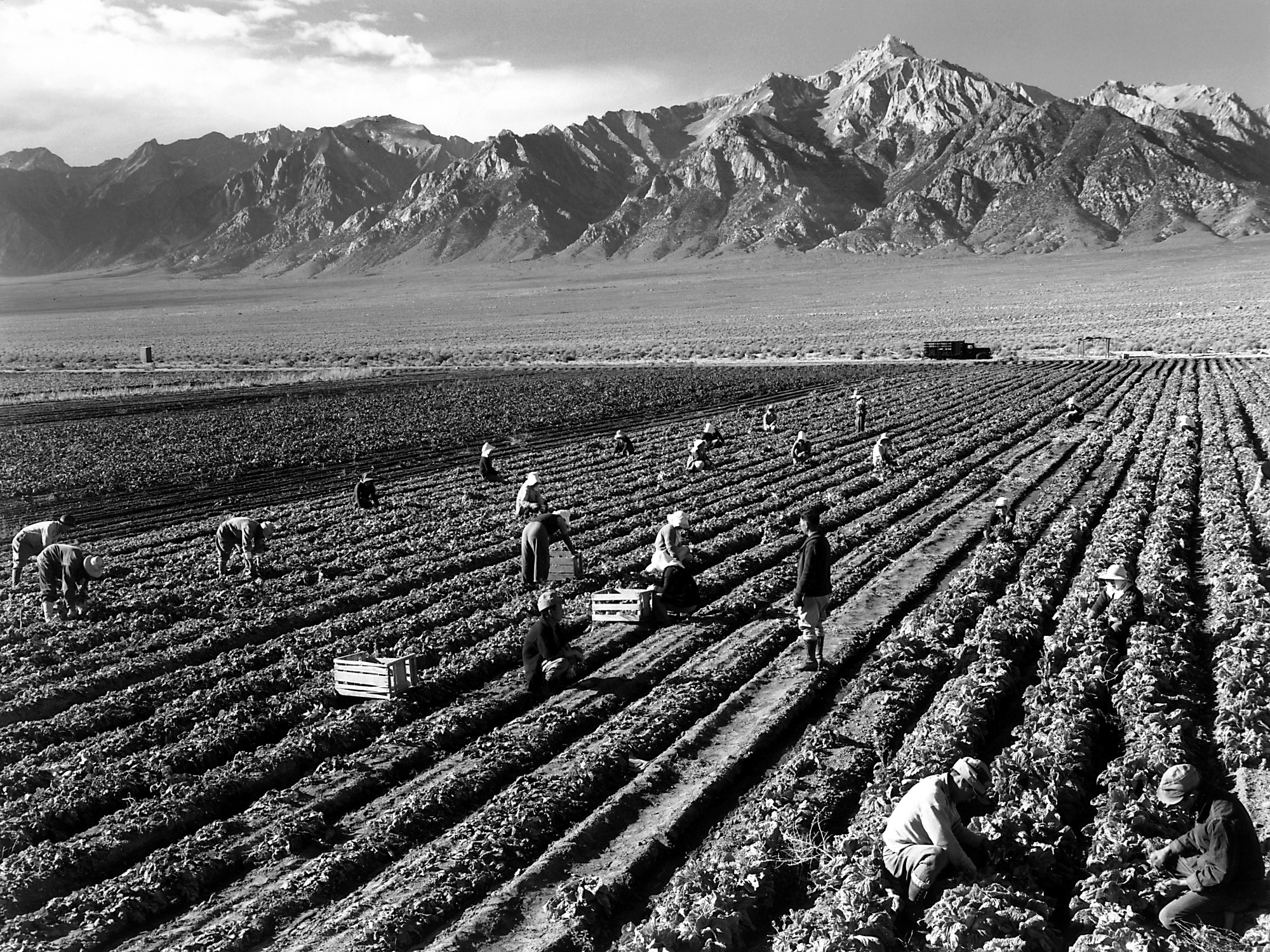
Farm workers on a field near Mount Williamson in Inyo County, California. This photograph is by Ansel Adams.

A farmworker or farmhand, is someone employed for labor in agriculture. In labor law, the term "farmworker" is sometimes used more narrowly, applying only to a hired worker involved in agricultural production, including harvesting. Agricultural work varies widely depending on context, degree of mechanization and crop. Low wages for farmworkers have been associated with farmworker shortages and delayed adoption of agricultural technology.

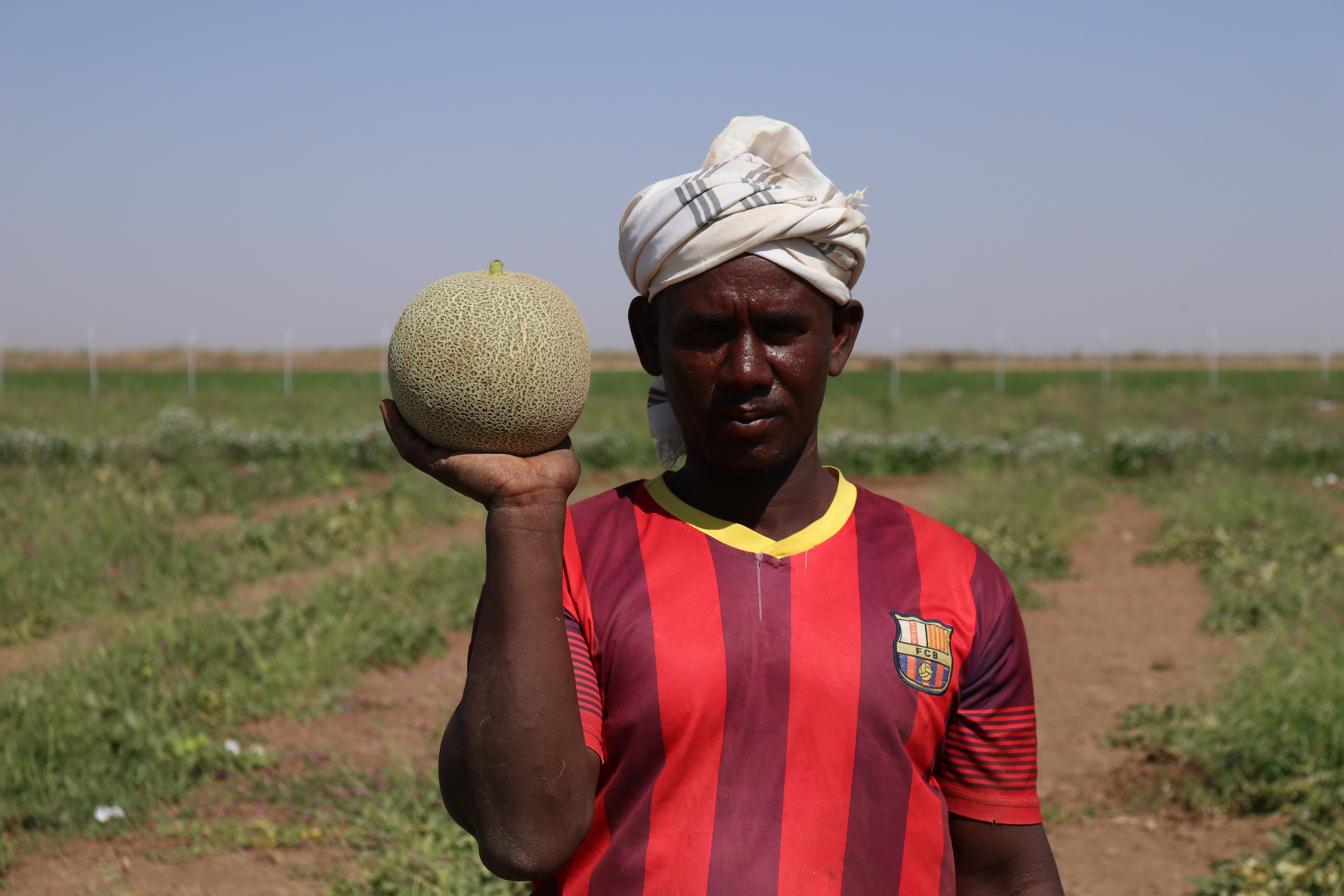
Sudanese farmer reviews cantaloupe production, south of Khartoum.

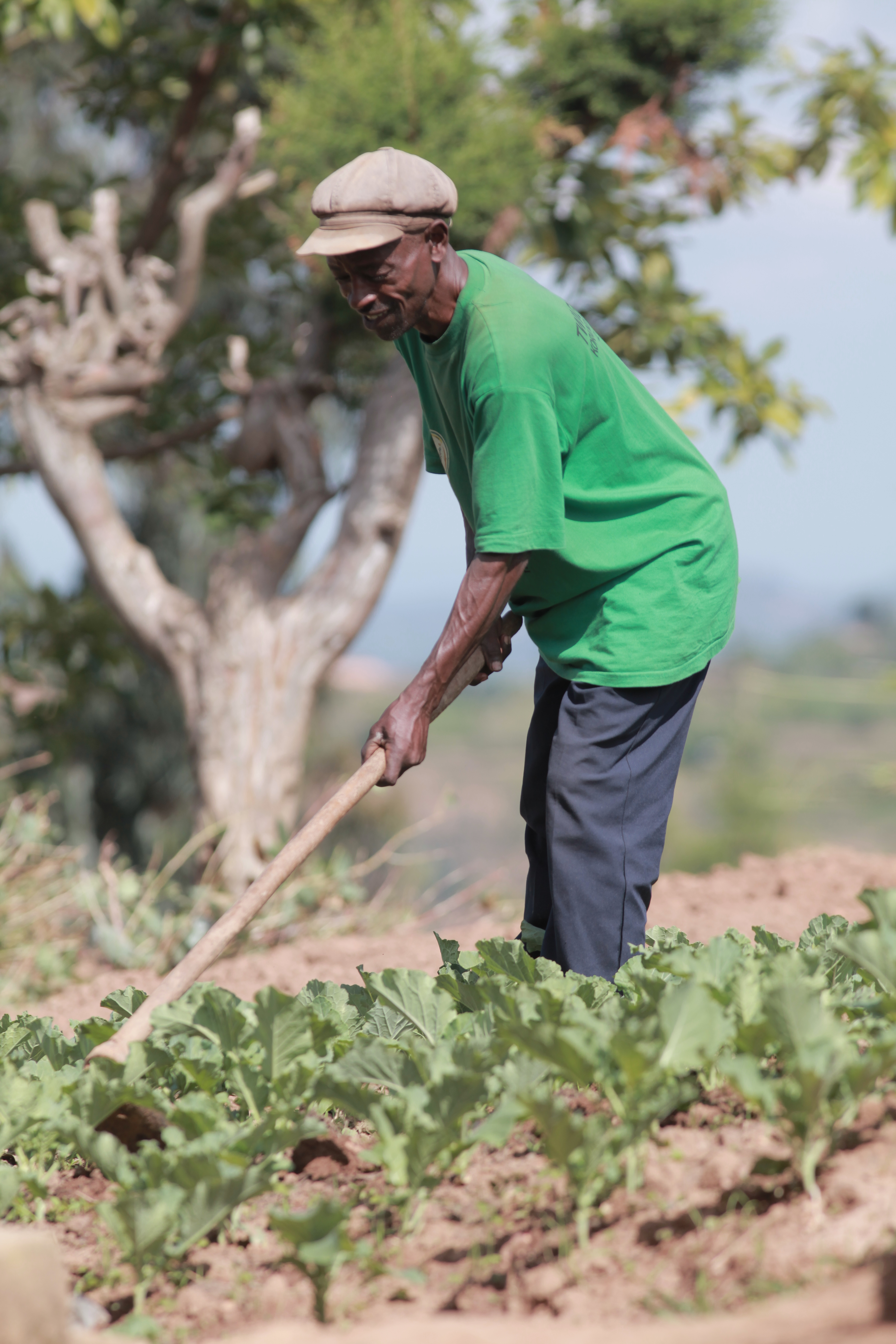
A Rwandan farmworker

Farmworkers in Nigeria making ridges

Agricultural labor is often affected by the human health impacts of environmental issues related to agriculture, such as health effects of pesticides or exposure to other health challenges such as valley fever. To address these environmental concerns and marginal working conditions, many labor rights, economic justice and environmental justice movements have been organized or supported by farmworkers.

==== Irrigation (3) ====
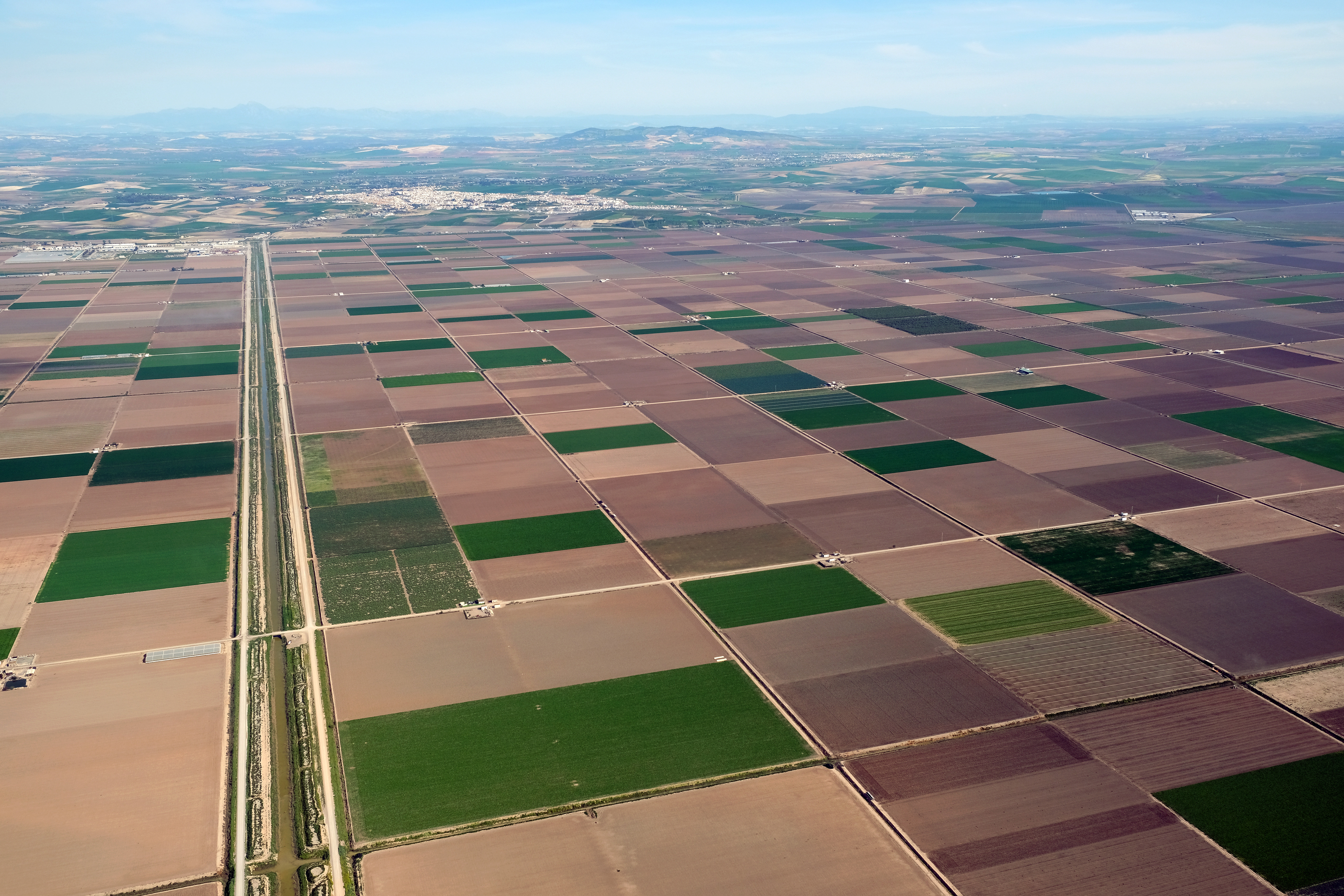
Irrigation of agricultural fields in Andalusia, Spain. Irrigation canal on the left.

Irrigation in agriculture is the practice of applying controlled amounts of water to land to help grow crops, landscape plants, and lawns. Irrigation has been a key aspect of agriculture for over 5,000 years and has been developed by many cultures worldwide. Irrigation helps to grow crops, maintain landscapes, and revegetate disturbed soils in dry areas and during times of below-average rainfall. In addition to these uses, irrigation is also employed to protect crops from frost, suppress weed growth in grain fields, and prevent soil consolidation. It is also used to cool livestock, reduce dust, dispose of sewage, and support mining operations. Drainage, which involves the removal of surface and sub-surface water from a given location, is often studied in conjunction with irrigation. Irrigation and drainage improvements are not necessarily mutually exclusive. Often both may be required together to assure sustained high-level production of crops. For a discussion of the role of drainage practices in agriculture.

Several irrigation methods differ in how water is supplied to plants. Surface irrigation, also known as gravity irrigation, is the oldest form of irrigation and has been in use for thousands of years. In sprinkler irrigation, water is piped to one or more central locations within the field and distributed by overhead high-pressure water devices. Micro-irrigation is a system that distributes water under low pressure through a piped network and applies it as a small discharge to each plant. Micro-irrigation uses less pressure and water flow than sprinkler irrigation. Drip irrigation delivers water directly to the root zone of plants. Subirrigation has been used in field crops in areas with high water tables for many years. It involves artificially raising the water table to moisten the soil below the root zone of plants.

Irrigation water can come from groundwater (extracted from springs or by using wells), from surface water (withdrawn from rivers, lakes or reservoirs) or from non-conventional sources like treated wastewater, desalinated water, drainage water, or fog collection. Irrigation can be supplementary to rainfall, which is common in many parts of the world as rainfed agriculture, or it can be full irrigation, where crops rarely rely on any contribution from rainfall. Full irrigation is less common and occurs only in arid landscapes with very low rainfall or when crops are grown in semi-arid areas outside the rainy season.

The environmental effects of irrigation relate to the changes in quantity and quality of soil and water as a result of irrigation and the subsequent effects on natural and social conditions in river basins and downstream of an irrigation scheme. The effects stem from altered hydrological conditions resulting from the installation and operation of the irrigation scheme. Amongst these problems is the depletion of underground aquifers through overdrafting. Soil can be over-irrigated due to poor distribution uniformity or management wastes water, chemicals, and may lead to water pollution. Over-irrigation can cause deep drainage from rising water tables, which can lead to irrigation salinity problems, requiring watertable control through some form of subsurface land drainage.

==== Seeds (4) ====
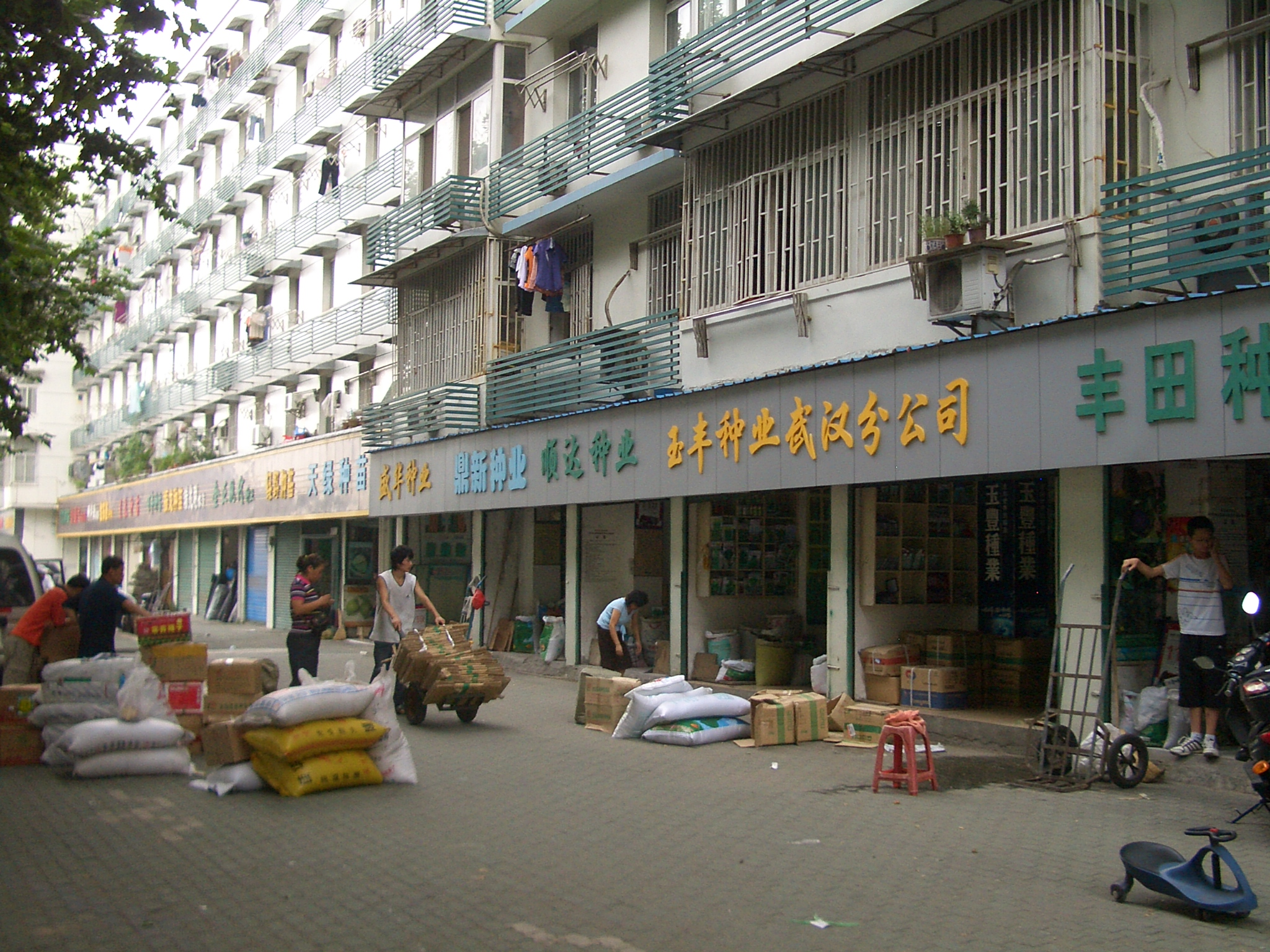
A street full of seed shops in Wuhan, China, a few blocks from Wuchang Railway Station

Seed companies produce and sell seeds for flowers, fruits and vegetables to commercial growers and amateur gardeners. The production of seed is a multibillion-dollar global business, which uses growing facilities and growing locations worldwide. While most of the seed is produced by large specialist growers, large amounts are also produced by small growers who produce only one to a few crop types. The larger companies supply seed both to commercial resellers and wholesalers. The resellers and wholesalers sell to vegetable and fruit growers, and to companies who package seed into packets and sell them on to the amateur gardener.

Most seed companies or resellers that sell to retail produce a catalog, for seed to be sown the following spring, that is generally published during early winter. These catalogs are eagerly awaited by the amateur gardener, as during winter months there is little that can be done in the garden so this time can be spent planning the following year’s gardening. The largest collection of nursery and seed trade catalogs in the U.S. is held at the National Agricultural Library where the earliest catalogs date from the late 18th century, with most published from the 1890s to the present.

Seed companies produce a huge range of seeds from highly developed F1 hybrids to open pollinated wild species. They have extensive research facilities to produce plants with genetic materials that result in improved uniformity and appeal. These qualities might include disease resistance, higher yields, dwarf habit and vibrant or new colors. These improvements are often closely guarded to protect them from being utilized by other producers, thus plant cultivars are often sold under the company's own name and protected by international laws from being grown for seed production by others. Along with the growth in the allotment movement, and the increasing popularity of gardening, there have emerged many small independent seed companies. Many of these are active in seed conservation and encouraging diversity. They often offer organic and open pollinated varieties of seeds as opposed to hybrids. Many of these varieties are heirloom varieties. The use of old varieties maintains diversity in the horticultural gene pool. It may be more appropriate for amateur gardeners to use older (heirloom) varieties as the modern seed types are often the same as those grown by commercial producers, and so characteristics which are useful to them (e.g. vegetables ripening at the same time) may be unsuited to home growing.

==== Fertilizers (5) ====
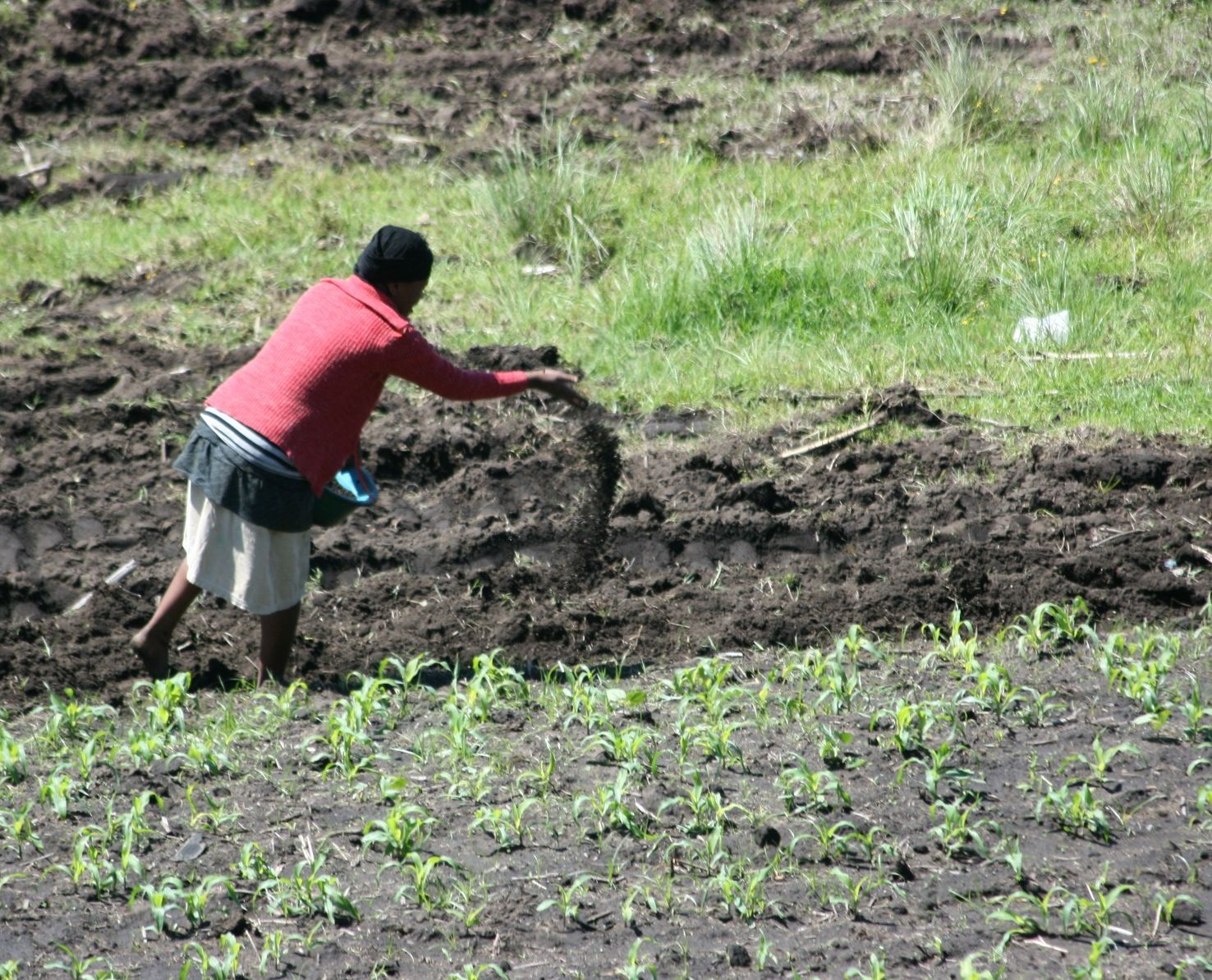
A farmer spreading manure to improve soil fertility

Fertilizer use in kg per hectare of arable land

A fertilizer or fertiliser is any material of natural or synthetic origin that is applied to soil or to plant tissues to supply plant nutrients. Fertilizers may be distinct from liming materials or other non-nutrient soil amendments. Many sources of fertilizer exist, both natural and industrially produced. For most modern agricultural practices, fertilization focuses on three main macronutrients: nitrogen (N), phosphorus (P), and potassium (K) with occasional addition of supplements like rock flour for micronutrients. Farmers apply these fertilizers in a variety of ways: through dry or pelletized or liquid application processes, using large agricultural equipment, or hand-tool methods.

Historically, fertilization came from natural or organic sources: compost, animal manure, human manure, harvested minerals, crop rotations, and byproducts of human-nature industries (e.g. fish processing waste, or bloodmeal from animal slaughter). However, starting in the 19th century, after innovations in plant nutrition following Justus von Liebig's discoveries, an agricultural industry developed around synthetically created agrochemical fertilizers. This transition was important in transforming the global food system towards larger-scale industrial agriculture with large crop yields in monocultures.

A farmer broadcasting solid fertilizer into his field in Janakkala, Finland in 1960

The invention of Haber process for producing ammonia for nitrogen in the 20th century combined with amplified chemical production capacity created during World War II led to a boom in using nitrogen fertilizers. In the latter half of the 20th century, increased use of nitrogen fertilizers (800% increase between 1961 and 2019) has been a crucial component of the increased productivity of conventional food systems as part of the so-called "Green Revolution".

Fertilizers, especially when applied excessively, can have environmental consequences such as water pollution and eutrophication due to nutrient runoff. Additionally, the chemical process for creating the fertilizers results in byproducts, including carbon and other emissions. In some cases contamination and pollution of soil result by accumulation of heavy metals contained in some fertilizers collected through mining. Sustainable agricultural practices, such as reduced tillage and planting buffer strips, can minimize these adverse environmental effects.

=== Production sector ===
==== Farming ====
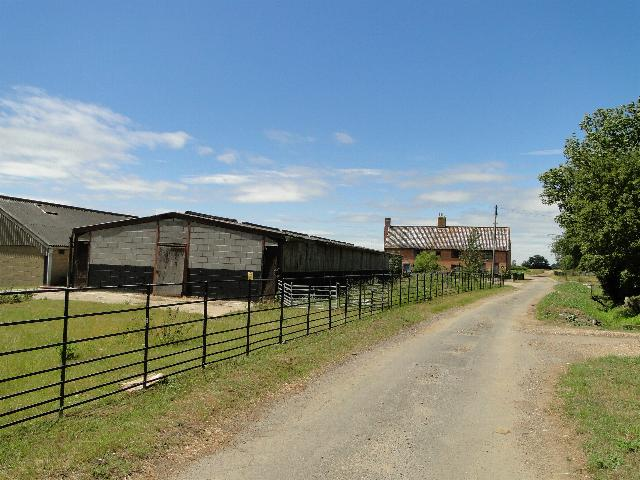
Church farm in Norfolk, England

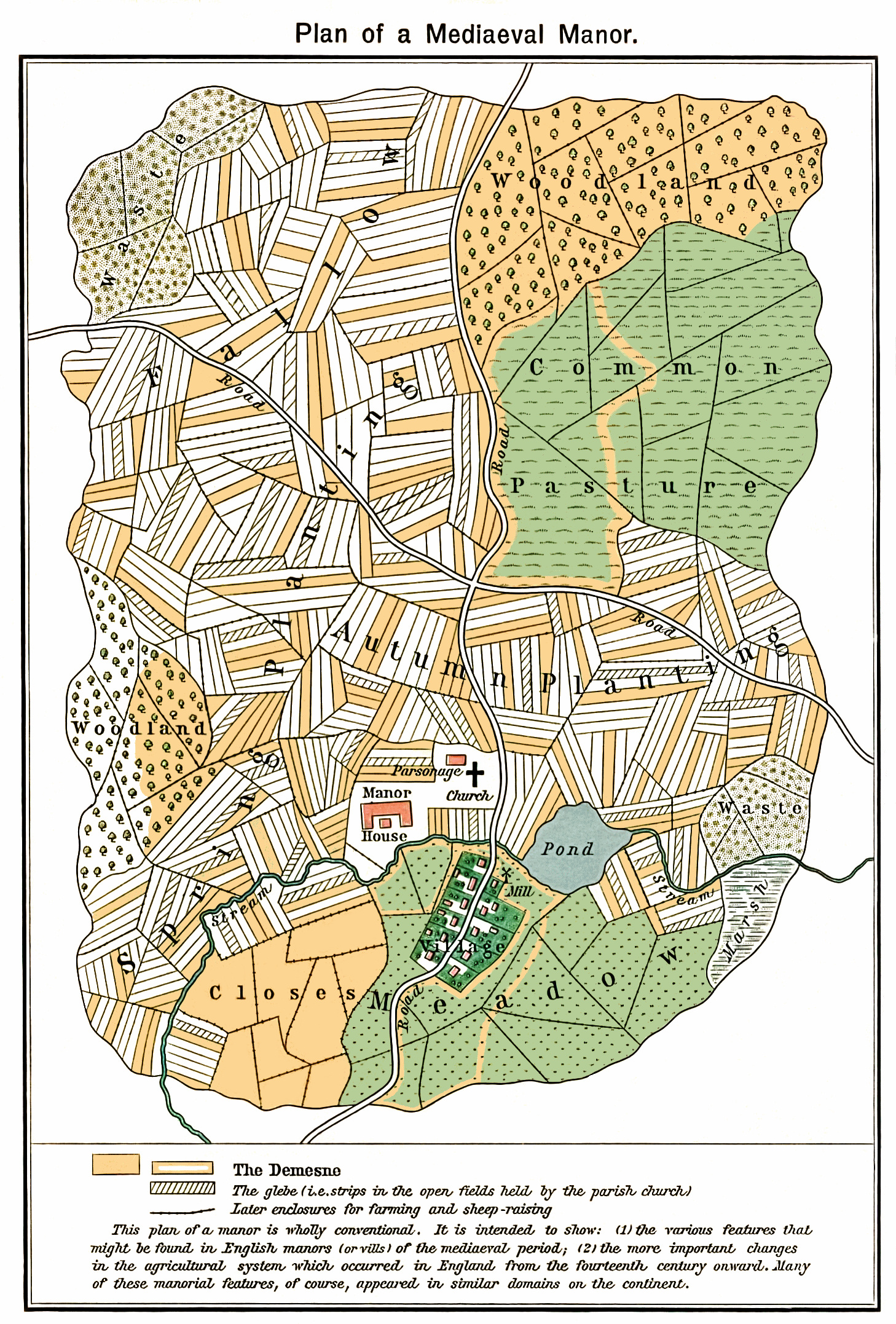
Typical plan of a medieval English manor, showing the use of field strips

A farm (also called an agricultural holding) is an area of land that is devoted primarily to agricultural processes with the primary objective of producing food and other crops; it is the basic facility in food production. The name is used for specialized units such as arable farms, vegetable farms, fruit farms, dairy, pig and poultry farms, and land used for the production of natural fiber, biofuel, and other biobased products. It includes ranches, feedlots, orchards, plantations and estates, smallholdings, and hobby farms, and includes the farmhouse and agricultural buildings as well as the land. In modern times, the term has been extended to include such industrial operations as wind farms and fish farms, both of which can operate on land or at sea.

There are about 570 million farms in the world, most of which are small and family-operated. Small farms with a land area of fewer than 2 hectares operate on about 12% of the world's agricultural land, and family farms comprise about 75% of the world's agricultural land.

Modern farms in developed countries are highly mechanized. In the United States, livestock may be raised on rangeland and finished in feedlots, and the mechanization of crop production has brought about a great decrease in the number of agricultural workers needed. In Europe, traditional family farms are giving way to larger production units. In Australia, some farms are very large because the land is unable to support a high stocking density of livestock because of climatic conditions. In less developed countries, small farms are the norm, and the majority of rural residents are subsistence farmers, feeding their families and selling any surplus products in the local market.

==== Farm mechanization ====
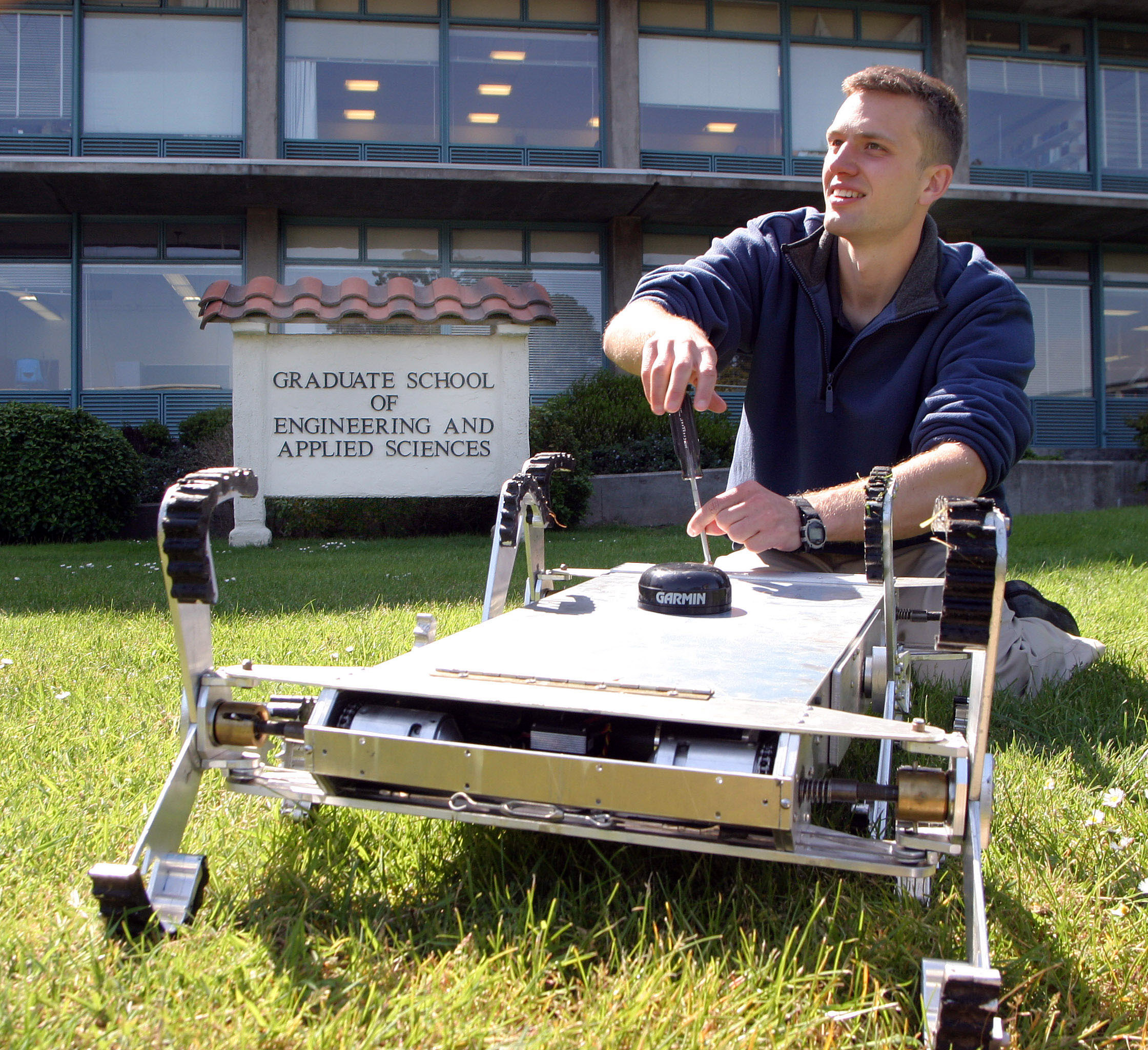
An agricultural and biosystems engineer fixing an agricultural robot

Agricultural engineering, also known as agricultural and biosystems engineering, is the field of study and application of engineering science and designs principles for agriculture purposes, combining the various disciplines of mechanical, civil, electrical, food science, environmental, software, and chemical engineering to improve the efficiency of farms and agribusiness enterprises as well as to ensure sustainability of natural and renewable resources.

An agricultural engineer is an engineer with an agriculture background. Agricultural engineers make the engineering designs and plans in an agricultural project, usually in partnership with an agriculturist who is more proficient in farming and agricultural science.

=== Processing sector ===
==== Primary processing ====
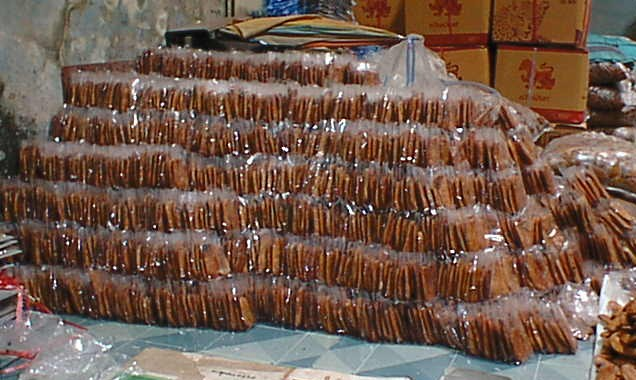
Whole, dried bananas in Thailand, an example of primary food processing

Primary food processing turns agricultural products, such as raw wheat kernels or livestock, into something that can eventually be eaten. This category includes ingredients that are produced by ancient processes such as drying, threshing, winnowing and milling grain, shelling nuts, and butchering animals for meat. It also includes deboning, cutting, freezing and smoking of animal products, extracting and filtering oils, canning food, preserving food through food irradiation, and candling eggs, as well as homogenizing and pasteurizing milk.

Contamination and spoilage problems in primary food processing can lead to significant public health threats, as the resulting foods are used so widely. However, many forms of processing contribute to improved food safety and longer shelf life before the food spoils. Commercial food processing uses control systems such as hazard analysis and critical control points (HACCP) and failure mode and effects analysis (FMEA) to reduce the risk of harm.

==== Secondary processing ====
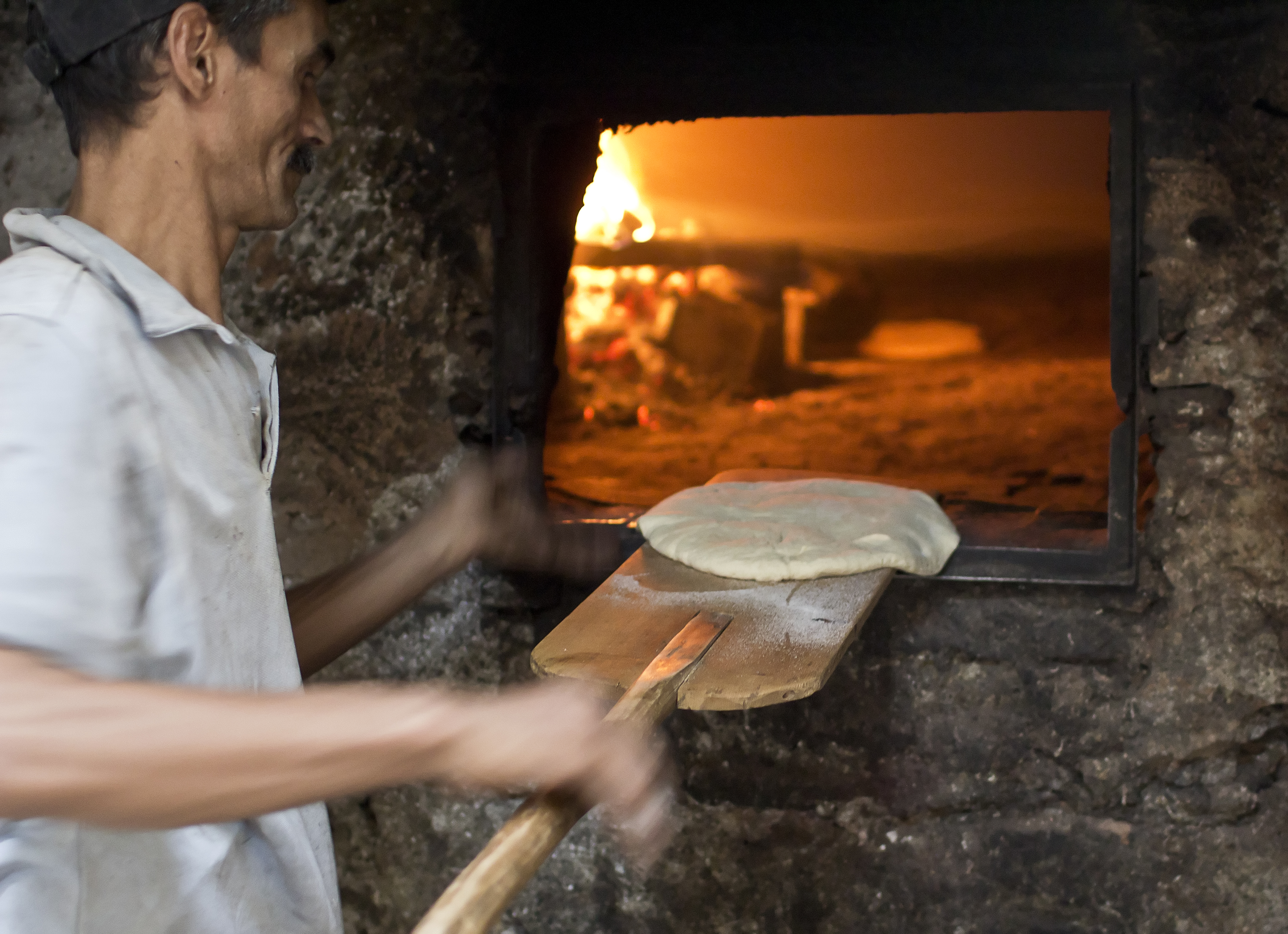
Baking bread is an example of secondary food processing.

Secondary food processing is the everyday process of creating food from ingredients that are ready to use. Baking bread, regardless of whether it is made at home, in a small bakery, or in a large factory, is an example of secondary food processing. Fermenting fish and making wine, beer, and other alcoholic products are traditional forms of secondary food processing. Sausages are a common form of secondary processed meat, formed by comminution (grinding) of meat that has already undergone primary processing. Most of the secondary food processing methods known to humankind are commonly described as cooking methods.

=== Marketing sector ===
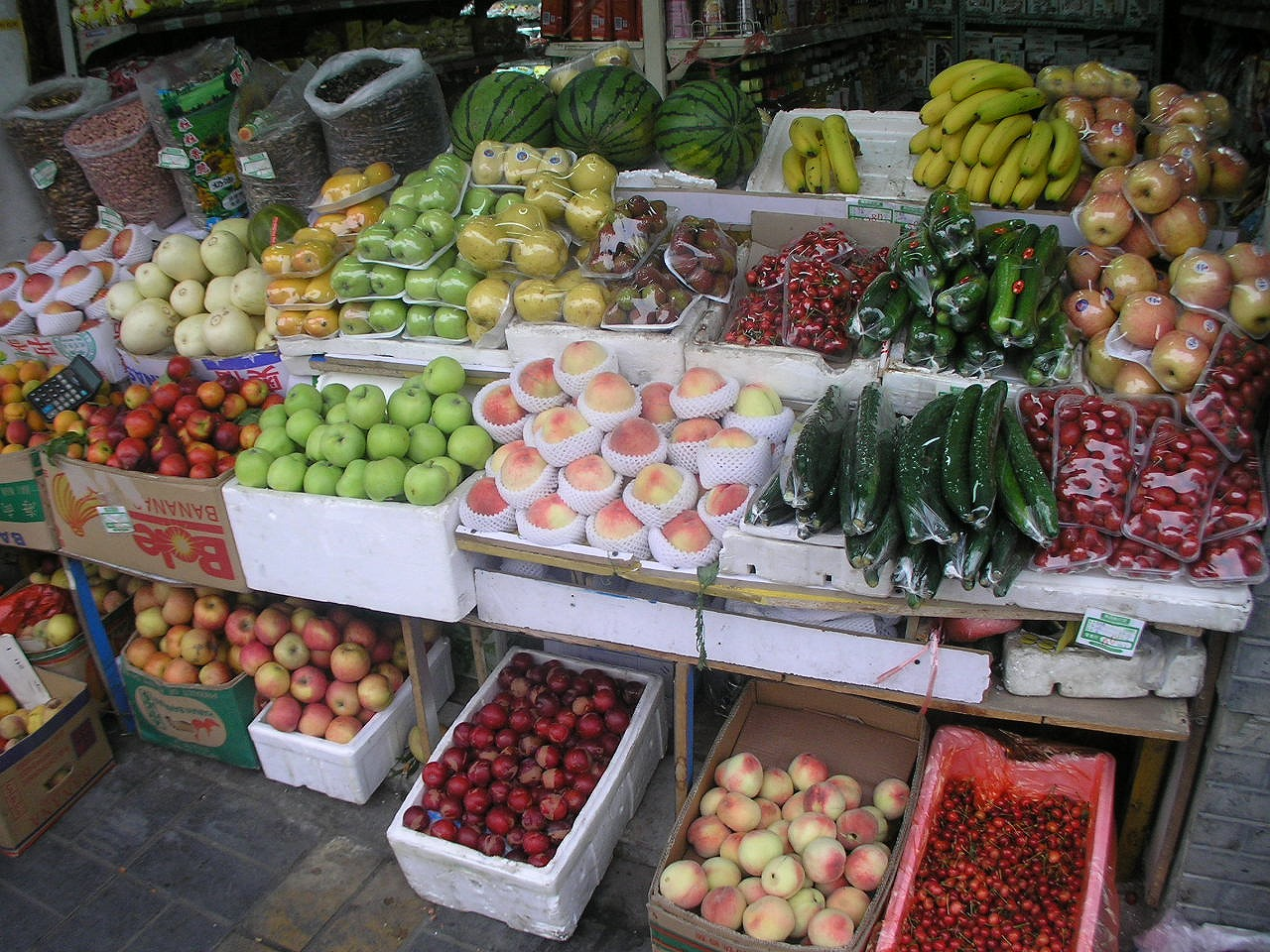
Market display in China

Agricultural marketing covers the services involved in moving an agricultural product from the farm to the consumer. These services involve the planning, organizing, directing and handling of agricultural produce in such a way as to satisfy farmers, intermediaries and consumers. Numerous interconnected activities are involved in doing this, such as planning production, growing and harvesting, grading, packing and packaging, transport, storage, agro- and food processing, provision of market information, distribution, advertising and sale. Effectively, the term encompasses the entire range of supply chain operations for agricultural products, whether conducted through ad hoc sales or through a more integrated chain, such as one involving contract farming.

==== Farmers' market ====
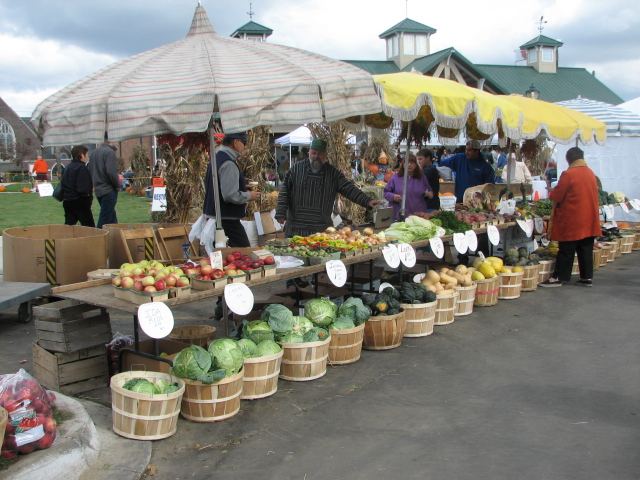
An autumn farmers' market in Farmington, Michigan

A farmers' market at twilight in Layyah, Pakistan

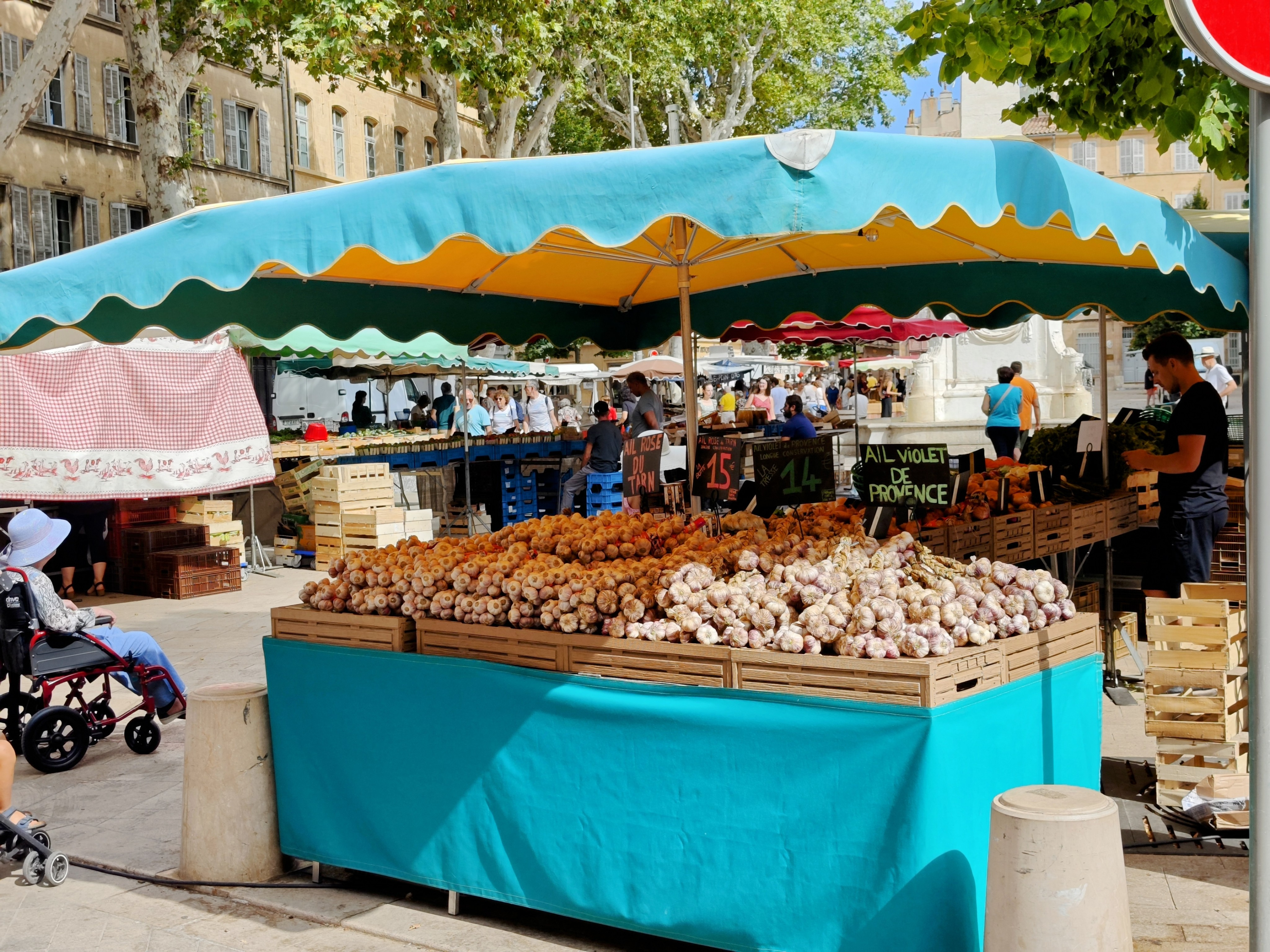
Fresh garlic displayed for sale at an outdoor market in France

A farmers' market (or farmers market according to the AP stylebook, also farmer's market in the Cambridge Dictionary) is a physical retail marketplace intended to sell foods directly by farmers to consumers. Farmers' markets may be indoors or outdoors and typically consist of booths, tables or stands where farmers sell their produce, live animals and plants, and sometimes prepared foods and beverages. Farmers' markets exist in many countries worldwide and reflect the local culture and economy. The size of the market may be just a few stalls or it may be as large as several city blocks. Due to their nature, they tend to be less rigidly regulated than retail produce shops.

They are distinguished from public markets, which are generally housed in permanent structures, open year-round, and offer a variety of non-farmer/non-producer vendors, packaged foods and non-food products.

=== Support sector ===
==== Education ====
Agricultural extension is the application of scientific research and new knowledge to agricultural practices through farmer education. The field of 'extension' now encompasses a wider range of communication and learning activities organized for rural people by educators from different disciplines, including agriculture, agricultural marketing, health, and business studies.

Extension practitioners can be found throughout the world, usually working for government agencies. They are represented by several professional organizations, networks and extension journals.

Agricultural extension agencies in developing countries receive large amounts of support from international development organizations such as the World Bank and the Food and Agriculture Organization of the United Nations.

==== Cooperatives ====
An agricultural cooperative, also known as a farmers' co-op, is a producer cooperative in which farmers pool their resources in certain areas of activities.

A broad typology of agricultural cooperatives distinguishes between agricultural service cooperatives, which provide various services to their individually-farming members, agricultural supply cooperatives, which purchase and distribute farm inputs to members, and agricultural production cooperatives in which production resources (land, machinery) are pooled and members farm jointly.

Agricultural production cooperatives include collective farms in former socialist countries, the kibbutzim in Israel, collectively-governed community shared agriculture, Longo Maï cooperatives in Costa Rica, France, and some other countries, CPAs in Cuba, and Nicaraguan production cooperatives. In Southeast Asian developing countries such as Vietnam, agricultural cooperatives remain to play an important role in economic and social activities in rural areas, although they have relied mainly on government subsidies.

Notable examples of agricultural cooperatives include Dairy Farmers Of America, the largest dairy company in the US, Amul, the largest food product marketing organization in India, and Zen-Noh, a federation of agricultural cooperatives that handles 70% of the sales of chemical fertilizers in Japan.

Agricultural cooperatives are owned and democratically controlled by their members. The governance structure can vary between the different types, but in general members elect representatives to a board of directors and contribute to organizational decision making through a democratic voting process. According to the 2021 Cooperative Governance Research Initiative, "Democratic member control is built into the DNA of all cooperatives but how that DNA expresses itself varies substantially."

==== Governments ====
The FAO Food Price Index (1961–2025). The average for 2014–2016 is set at 100. Real Nominal

The Food and Agriculture Organization of the United Nations (FAO) is a specialized agency of the United Nations that leads international efforts to defeat hunger and improve nutrition and food security. Its Latin motto, fiat panis, translates to "let there be bread". It was founded on 16 October 1945 in Quebec City, Canada.

The FAO comprises 194 members, including 193 countries and one member organization, the European Union (EU). Its headquarters is in Rome, Italy, and it maintains regional and field offices worldwide, operating in over 130 countries. It helps governments and development agencies coordinate their activities to improve and develop agriculture, forestry, fisheries, and land and water resources. It also conducts research, provides technical assistance to projects, operates educational and training programs, and collects agricultural output, production, and development data.

The FAO is governed by a biennial conference representing each member country and the EU, which elects a 49-member executive council. As of 2019, the director-general is Qu Dongyu of China, who serves as the chief administrative officer. Various committees govern matters such as finance, programs, agriculture, and fisheries.
100 lire (FAO's celebration.)
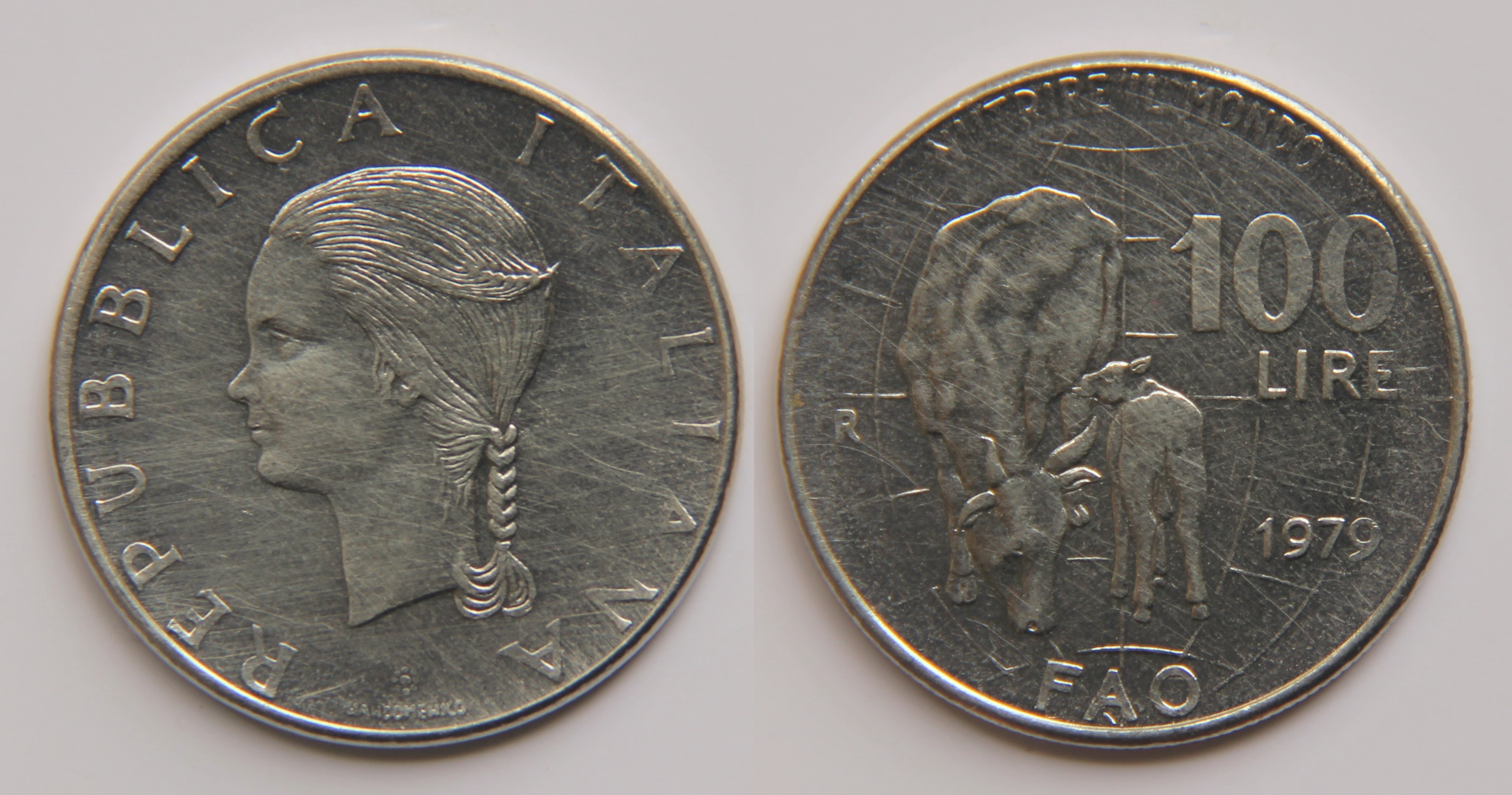
First side of the image: Obverse: Young woman with braid facing left. Surrounded by Repubblica Italiana [Italian Republic].
Second side of the image: Reverse: Cow nursing calf, face value & date. FAO at bottom and Nutrire il Mondo [Feed the world] at top.
Coin minted by Italy in the 1970s to celebrate and promote the Food and Agriculture Organization.

==== Professionals ====
An agriculturist, agriculturalist, agrologist, or agronomist (abbreviated as agr.) is a professional in the science, practice, and management of agriculture and agribusiness. It is a regulated profession in Canada, the United States, the European Union, Pakistan, India, Japan and the Philippines. Other names used to designate the profession include agricultural scientist, agricultural manager, agricultural planner, agriculture researcher, or agriculture policy maker.

The primary role of agriculturists are in leading agricultural projects and programs, usually in agribusiness planning or research for the benefit of farms, food, and agribusiness-related organizations. Agriculturists usually are designated in the government as public agriculturists serving as agriculture policymakers or technical advisors for policy making. Agriculturists can also provide technical advice for farmers and farm workers such as in making crop calendars and workflows to optimize farm production, tracing agricultural market channels, prescribing fertilizers and pesticides to avoid misuse, and in aligning for organic accreditation or the national agricultural quality standards.

Preparation of technical engineering designs and construction for agriculture meanwhile are reserved for agricultural engineers. Agriculturists may pursue environmental planning and focus on agricultural and rural planning.

== Studies and reports ==
Studies of agribusiness often come from the academic fields of agricultural economics and management studies, sometimes called agribusiness management. To promote more development of food economies, many government agencies support the research and publication of economic studies and reports exploring agribusiness and agribusiness practices. Some of these studies are on foods produced for export and are derived from agencies focused on food exports. These agencies include the Foreign Agricultural Service (FAS) of the U.S. Department of Agriculture, Agriculture and Agri-Food Canada (AAFC), Austrade, and New Zealand Trade and Enterprise (NZTE).

The Federation of International Trade Associations publishes studies and reports by FAS and AAFC, as well as other non-governmental organizations on its website.

In their book A Concept of Agribusiness, Ray Goldberg and John Davis provided a rigorous economic framework for the field. They traced a complex value-added chain that begins with the farmer's purchase of seed and livestock and ends with a product fit for the consumer's table. Agribusiness boundary expansion is driven by a variety of transaction costs.

As concern over global warming intensifies, biofuels derived from crops are gaining increased public and scientific attention. This is driven by factors such as oil price spikes, the need for increased energy security, concern over greenhouse gas emissions from fossil fuels, and support from government subsidies. In Europe and in the US, increased research and production of biofuels have been mandated by law.

== See also ==
- Agrarian law
- Agrarian reform
- Agribusiness in Kenya
- Agricultural machinery industry
- Agricultural marketing
- Agricultural value chain
- Agroecology
- Biofuel
- Contract farming
- Energy crop
- Energy law
- Environmental impact of agriculture
- Factory farming
- Industrial agriculture
- Land banking
- Pharming (genetics)
