= Vavilov center =

Area where domestication traits arise

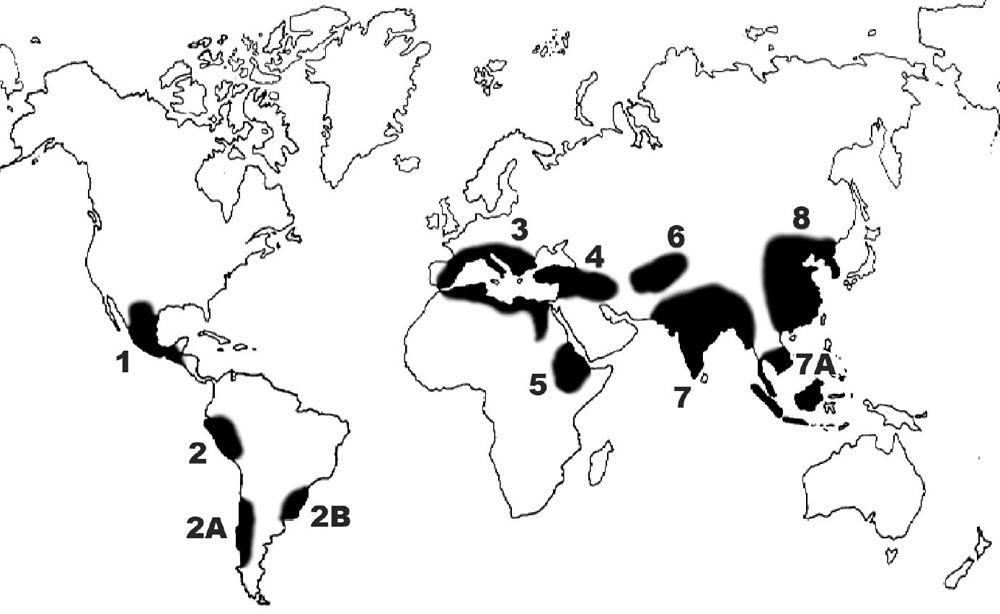
Vavilov's 1924 scheme suggested that cultivated plants were domesticated in China, Hindustan, Central Asia, Asia Minor, Mediterranean, Abyssinia, Central and South America.

A Vavilov center or center of origin is a geographical area where a group of organisms, either domesticated or wild, first developed its distinctive properties. Centers of origin were first identified in 1924 by Nikolai Vavilov. Vavilov posited that the center of origin for a species or genus is the same as its center of diversity, the geographic area where it has the highest genetic diversity, but this equivalence has been disputed by later scholars.

== Plants ==
Locating the origin of crop plants is basic to plant breeding. This allows one to locate wild relatives, related species, and new genes (especially dominant genes, which may provide resistance to diseases). Knowledge of the origins of crop plants is important in order to avoid genetic erosion, the loss of germplasm due to the loss of ecotypes and landraces, loss of habitat (such as rainforests), and increased urbanization. Germplasm preservation is accomplished through gene banks (largely seed collections but now frozen stem sections) and preservation of natural habitats (especially in centers of origin).

== Vavilov centers ==
Approximate centers of origin of agriculture in the Neolithic Revolution and its spread in prehistory as understood in 2003: the Fertile Crescent (11,000 BP), the Yangtze and Yellow River basins (9,000 BP) and the New Guinea Highlands (9,000–6,000 BP), Central Mexico (5,000–4,000 BP), Northern South America (5,000–4,000 BP), sub-Saharan Africa (5,000–4,000 BP, exact location unknown), eastern North America (4,000–3,000 BP).

A Vavilov center (of diversity) is a region of the world first indicated by Nikolai Vavilov to be an original center for the domestication of plants. For crop plants, Vavilov identified differing numbers of centers: three in 1924, five in 1926, six in 1929, seven in 1931, eight in 1935 and reduced to seven again in 1940.

Vavilov argued that plants were not domesticated somewhere in the world at random, but that there were regions where domestication started. The center of origin is also considered the center of diversity.

=== Schery (1972) and Janick (2002) ===
Vavilov centers are regions where a high diversity of crop wild relatives can be found, representing the natural relatives of domesticated crop plants.

Cultivated plants of eight world centers of origin
Center	Subcenter	Plants
1) South Mexican and Central American Center; Includes southern sections of Mexico, Guatemala, El Salvador, Honduras and Costa Rica.		Grains and Legumes: maize, common bean, lima bean, tepary bean, jack bean, grain amaranth; Melon Plants: Malabar gourd, winter pumpkin, chayote; Fiber Plants: upland cotton, bourbon cotton, henequen (sisal); Miscellaneous: sweet potato, arrowroot, pepper, papaya, guava, cashew, wild black cherry, cochineal cactus, cherry tomato, cacao
2) South American Center; 62 plants listed; three subcenters	2) Peruvian, Ecuadorean, Bolivian Subcenter	Root Tubers: Andean potato, other endemic cultivated potato species. Fourteen or more species with chromosome numbers varying from 24 to 60, edible nasturtium; Grains and Legumes: starchy maize, lima bean, common bean; Root Tubers: edible canna, potato; Vegetable Crops: pepino, tomato, ground cherry, pumpkin, pepper; Fibre Plants: Egyptian cotton; Fruit and Miscellaneous: cocoa, passion flower, guava, heilborn, quinine tree, tobacco, cherimoya, coca
2) South American Center; 62 plants listed; three subcenters	2A) Chiloé Subcenter	Common potato (48 chromosomes), Chilean strawberry
2) South American Center; 62 plants listed; three subcenters	2B) Brazilian-Paraguayan Subcenter	manioc, peanut, rubber tree, pineapple, Brazil nut, cashew, Erva-mate, purple granadilla.
3) Mediterranean Center; Includes all of Southern Europe and Northern Africa bordering the Mediterranean Sea. 84 listed plants		Grains and Legumes: durum wheat, emmer, Polish wheat, spelt, Mediterranean oats, sand oats, canarygrass, grass pea, pea, lupine; Forage Plants: Egyptian clover, white clover, crimson clover, serradella; Oil and Fibre Plants: flax, rape, black mustard, olive; Vegetables: garden beet, cabbage, turnip, lettuce, asparagus, celery, chicory, parsnip, rhubarb; Ethereal Oil and Spice Plants: caraway, anise, thyme, peppermint, sage, hop
4) Middle East; Includes interior of Asia Minor, all of Transcaucasia, Iran, and the highlands of Turkmenistan. 83 species		Grains and Legumes: einkorn wheat, durum wheat, poulard wheat, common wheat, oriental wheat, Persian wheat, two-row barley, rye, Mediterranean oats, common oats, lentil, lupine; Forage Plants: alfalfa, Persian clover, fenugreek, vetch, hairy vetch; Fruits: fig, pomegranate, apple, pear, quince, cherry, hawthorn
5) Abyssinian Center; Includes Ethiopia, Eritrea, and part of Somalia. 38 species listed; rich in wheat and barley.		Grains and Legumes: Abyssinian hard wheat, poulard wheat, emmer, Polish wheat, barley, grain sorghum, pearl millet, African millet, cowpea, flax, teff; Miscellaneous: sesame, castor bean, garden cress, coffee, okra, myrrh, indigo, enset
6) Central Asiatic Center; Includes Northwest India (Punjab, Northwest Frontier Provinces and Kashmir), Afghanistan, Tajikistan, Uzbekistan, and western Tian-Shan. 43 plants		Grains and Legumes: common wheat, club wheat, shot wheat, peas, lentil, horse bean, chickpea, mung bean, mustard, flax, sesame; Fiber Plants: hemp, cotton; Vegetables: onion, garlic, spinach, carrot; Fruits: pistachio, pear, almond, grape, apple
7) Indian Center; Two subcenters	7) Indo-Burma Subcenter; Main Center (India): Includes Assam, Bangladesh and Burma, but not Northwest India, Punjab, nor Northwest Frontier Provinces, 117 plants	Grains and Legumes: chickpea, pigeon pea, urd bean, mung bean, rice bean, cowpea; Vegetables and Tubers: eggplant, cucumber, radish, taro, yam; Fruits: mango, tangerine, citron, tamarind; Sugar, Oil, and Fibre Plants: sugar cane, coconut palm, sesame, safflower, tree cotton, oriental cotton, jute, crotalaria, kenaf; Spices, Stimulants, Dyes, and Miscellaneous: hemp, black pepper, gum arabic, sandalwood, indigo, cinnamon tree, croton, bamboo, turmeric
7) Indian Center; Two subcenters	7A) Siam-Malaya-Java Subcenter statt Indo-Malayan Center; Includes Indo-China and the Malay Archipelago, 55 plants	Grains and Legumes: Job's tears, velvet bean; Fruits: pomelo, banana, breadfruit, mangosteen; Oil, Sugar, Spice, and Fibre Plants: candlenut, coconut palm, sugarcane, clove, nutmeg, black pepper, Manila hemp
8) Chinese Center; A total of 136 endemic plants in the largest independent center		Grains and Legumes: rice, broomcorn millet, Italian millet, Japanese barnyard millet, sorghum, buckwheat, hull-less barley, soybean, adzuki bean, velvet bean; Roots, Tubers, and Vegetables: Chinese yam, radish, Chinese cabbage, onion, cucumber; Fruits and Nuts: pear, Chinese apple, peach, apricot, cherry, walnut, litchi, orange; Sugar, Drug, and Fibre Plants: sugar cane, opium poppy, ginseng camphor, hemp

=== Purugganan and Fuller (2009) ===
Center	Plants	Years before present
1) eastern North America	Chenopodium berlandieri, Iva annua, and Helianthus annuus	4,500–4,000 years
2) Mesoamerica	Cucurbita pepo	10,000
	Zea mays	9,000–7,000
2a) northern lowland neotropics	Cucurbita moschata, Ipomoea batatas, Phaseolus vulgaris, tree crops	9,000–8,000
3) central mid-altitude Andes	Chenopodium quinoa, Amaranthus caudatus	5,000
3a) north and central Andes, mid-altitude and high altitude areas	Solanum tuberosum, Oxalis tuberosa, Chenopodium pallidicaule	8,000
3b) lowland southern Amazonia	Manihot esculenta and Arachis hypogaea	8,000
3c) Ecuador (part of 3, 3a, and/or 3b?) and northwest Peru	Phaseolus lunatus, Canavalia plagiosperma, and Cucurbita ecuadorensis	10,000
4) western sub-Saharan African	Pennisetum glaucum	4,500
4a) west African savanna and woodlands	Vigna unguiculata	3,700
	Digitaria exilis and Oryza glaberrima	<3,000
4b) west African rainforests	Dioscorea rotundata and Elaeis guineensis	poorly documented
5) east Sudanic Africa	Sorghum bicolor	>4,000?
6) east African uplands	Eragrostis tef and Eleusine coracana	4,000?
east African lowlands	vegeculture of Dioscorea cayennensis and Ensete ventricosum	poorly documented
7) Near East	Hordeum vulgare, Triticum spp., Lens culinaris, Pisum sativum, Cicer arietinum, Vicia faba	13,000–10,000
7a) eastern Fertile Crescent	additional Hordeum vulgare	
	goats	9,000
8a) Gujarat, India	Panicum sumatrense and Vigna mungo	5,000?
8b) Upper Indus	Panicum sumatrense, Vigna radiata, and Vigna aconitifolia	5,000
8c) Ganges	Oryza sativa subsp. indica	8,500–4,500
8d) southern India	Brachiaria ramosa, Vigna radiata, and Macrotyloma uniflorum	5,000–4,000
9) eastern Himalayas and Yunnan uplands	Fagopyrum esculentum	5,000?
10) northern China	Setaria italica and Panicum miliaceum	8,000
	Glycine max	4,500?
11) southern Hokkaido, Japan	Echinochloa crusgalli	4,500
12) Yangtze River Valley, China	Oryza sativa subsp. japonica	9,000–6,000
12a) southern China	Colocasia spp., Coix lacryma-jobi	poorly documented, 4,500?
13) New Guinea and Wallacea	Colocasia esculenta, Dioscorea esculenta, and Musa acuminata	7,000

== See also ==
- Crop diversity
- Landrace
- Neglected and underutilized crop
