= Dioscorea praehensilis =

Scientific classification
- Kingdom: Plantae
- Clade: Tracheophytes
- Clade: Angiosperms
- Clade: Monocots
- Order: Dioscoreales
- Family: Dioscoreaceae
- Genus: Dioscorea
- Species: D. praehensilis

Binomial name
- Dioscorea praehensilis Benth.

Species of yam from Africa

Dioscorea praehensilis is a species of yam in the genus Dioscorea native to Africa. It is the wild progenitor of the West African domesticated crops Dioscorea rotundata and Dioscorea cayennensis. It is a liana with an edible tuber root found in African rainforests and seasonal tropical forests. The roots reach their maximum starch reserves during the dry season. The species renews its stems every year at the start of the rainy season.
