= Agricultural finance =

Agricultural finance is a branch of finance which comprises financial services for agricultural production, processing and marketing, leasing (both land and equipment), and crop and livestock insurance.

Although agricultural finance mostly overlaps with rural finance, some larger agricultural companies are also located in bigger towns and cities. Moreover, not every rural finance operation is directly related to agriculture.

Agricultural financial services include loans, savings, payment and money transfer services, and risk management.

Agricultural financial services are provided by a spectrum of organizations of various size and level of formality. They include:

- Private and State Banks;
- Cooperatives:
  - Financial cooperatives;
  - Mutualist financial institutions such as credit unions or savings and loan associations;
- Finance companies:
  - Leasing companies;
  - Non-bank financial institutions;
  - Factoring companies
- Insurance companies;
- Investment funds;
- Value chain providers such as input suppliers, processors, aggregators, traders;
- Rotating savings and credit association or accumulating savings and credit associations;
- Informal credit sources such as family and local money lenders.

The demand side of agricultural finance sector is also diverse, ranging from semi-subsistence households to micro and small enterprises engaged in agricultural activities, and medium/large companies engaged in production, manufacturing, trade and services. Their financial needs differ widely in terms of amounts, terms and conditions as well as the degree of sophistication of financial services required.

== Challenges ==
In addition to risks and challenges inherent to any financial services provider, agricultural financial service providers face additional risks and challenges specific to agriculture and rural areas. These challenges are related to seasonality of farming business and low population density in rural areas.

Some agricultural activities involve long gestation periods up to several years (for tree crops). Many require large capital investments, for example for farm equipment. This leads to a slow rotation of the invested capital. Lenders need to offer longer loan maturities and less frequent or irregular repayment installments to match the cash flow of borrowers.

Longer loan maturities and irregular repayment schedules are more risky and present additional challenges to liquidity management. Moreover, the slower rotation of capital results in lower profitability of agriculture and related activities.

Agricultural sector depends significantly on external factors such as the weather, pest and disease outbreaks and prices of inputs and outputs, which are beyond the farmers' control. This translates to additional risks for agricultural financial institutions. These risks are exacerbated by the fact that they are common for most or all farmers in the area. For rural financial institutions, this translates into considerable portfolio risk.

Low population densities and poor infrastructure result in high transaction costs for rural financial service providers and for their clients. This increases the costs of financial services, thereby reducing the effective demand for loans.

Additionally, agriculture is a politically sensitive topic, prone to government interventions, such as:

- price controls;
- lending quotas;
- interest rate ceilings;
- tariffs and subsidies;
- direct government involvement in agricultural loans (such as Farm Loans from USDA in USA).

== See also ==
- Agricultural economics
