= Kokoro (vegetable) =

Scientific classification
- Kingdom: Plantae
- Clade: Tracheophytes
- Clade: Angiosperms
- Clade: Monocots
- Order: Dioscoreales
- Family: Dioscoreaceae
- Genus: Dioscorea
- Species: D. cayenensis
- Subspecies: D. c. subsp. rotundata
- Variety: D. c. var. Kokoro

Trinomial name
- Dioscorea cayenensis var. Kokoro

Variety of yam

Kokoro is a variety of Dioscorea rotundata yam that are abundant in Western Nigeria, Benin and Togo. Their common use by ethnic groups such as the Yoruba that put heavy pressure on the cultivated land suggests that they have been cultivated since ancient times, since they are the only type of yam that gives good yields on degraded soil. In modern times, Kokoro yams are gaining in importance as the yam chips trade is expanding. The Kokoro variety is essential for preparing peeled and dried yam.
