= Price monitoring =

Price monitoring is the systematic process of observing and tracking the prices of commercial products to ensure they do not fall below a predetermined threshold. This activity is essential for organizations aiming to maintain stability in market prices and protect against significant fluctuations that could adversely affect economic balance. To achieve this objective, entities employ a variety of strategies, including the establishment of price ceilings and floors, which act as upper and lower limits on prices to prevent extreme price fluctuations over the short run. Additionally, careful analysis of supply and demand trends is conducted to anticipate shifts in market dynamics. Forecasting future demand also plays a crucial role in this process, enabling organizations to make informed decisions to regulate prices effectively. Through these measures, price monitoring serves as a critical tool in sustaining market equilibrium and fostering a stable economic environment.

== Price Monitoring ==
Price monitoring is a tool that enables companies to keep abreast of market trends and fluctuations. It involves tracking changes in prices, allowing companies to adapt their pricing strategies accordingly.

The data gathered from price monitoring offers insights into consumer responses to price changes. This information is vital for companies to develop effective pricing strategies, considering factors like market trends, consumer behavior, and the actions of competitors.
