= White yam =

White yam refers to at least two plants in the genus Dioscorea:

- Dioscorea alata
- Dioscorea rotundata, native to Africa
