= Hitas =

Apartment price and quality regulation system in Helsinki, Finland

Hitas is a system for regulating the price and quality of apartments in Helsinki, Finland. The system is intended to provide affordable owned apartments to Helsinkians. Apartments within the Hitas system are set a maximum selling price already when the lot is signed over for construction, and this maximum selling price may not be exceeded even when selling the apartment afterwards. The system includes approximately 18 000 apartments, all of them in Helsinki.

Hitas regulated apartments are generally a little less expensive than those on the free market, depending on the location and date of building. All Hitas apartments are situated on lots rented from the city.

== Formation of the maximum selling price ==
The current market index was taken into use on 1 March 2004. Before this, the Hitas maximum price was calculated by a specific Hitas price index. However, the index change had a negative effect on the price of apartments built from 1988 to 1990, and so a complaint was made about this to the city council and the legal warden of the Parliament of Finland. The city council decided on 29 March 2005 to extend the use of the old Hitas index parallel to the market index longer than originally planned, and make changes to the calculations according to voiced complaints.

Exceeding the maximum selling price can result in compulsory purchase of the apartment, to the loss of the buyer. Such action is taken a couple of times per year. The owner of a Hitas apartment is entitled to sell furniture at a decent price, but the price of the furniture may not exceed its real value. Also renovations and improvements to the apartment, such as a glassed terrace, might increase the Hitas price. The owner must provide a written record of the improvements.

Repairs to the apartment can also increase the Hitas price. According to the new price index, the value of the repairs must be at least 100 € per square metre for them to have an effect on the price. Any possible corporate loan left over is deducted from the maximum selling price, if it has not been paid yet for the apartment.

The seller of the apartment must provide a premade and confirmed calculation of the Hitas maximum selling price to the buyer on demand.

== Queueing for Hitas apartments ==
The selling of the Hitas apartments has been criticised as old-fashioned. In April 2010, the city of Helsinki sold one hundred new apartments in three corporations in Hermanni for about €3000 per square metre€, 400 below the average price of old apartments in the neighbourhood. The apartments were only available for sale in the housing cooperative premises in Pasila, in a queueing order of buyers having come to the premises. Some people even spent several days in front of the premises queuing for new apartments.

This was the last new Hitas building where buyers queued in front of the premises in Pasila. Further apartments were dealt by random.

== Criticism ==
Professor Ari Hyytinen says the Hitas system favours those who have the time and possibility to queue outside, and as such is unfavourable towards families with children, single parents, people with long-time illnesses, and the elderly. He also claims that artificially low prices attract over-demand, along with its problems.

According to professor Niko Määttänen the Hitas system makes no sense, because of the following reasons:

=== The apartments are targeted inefficiently ===
A greater problem than the queuing is that the system causes apartments to be targeted poorly to different kinds of people. Because of the low prices, the apartments end up in the hands of those who happen to buy them, not those who might have use for them. As well as this, it is inefficient for the people to move out of their cheap apartments even when their housing needs change.

=== Other apartments become more expensive ===
Because of the inefficient targeting of the apartments, the shortage of apartments worsens, and the prices of non-Hitas apartments rise.

=== The system is expensive ===
The city loses money renting out or selling lots below the market price. This support is targeted to middle-class individuals instead of equally among citizens, which Määttänen claims is unfair.

According to Määttänen, the effect on segregation is weakened by people renting out Hitas apartments to well-off tenants.

== See also ==
- Price ceiling
