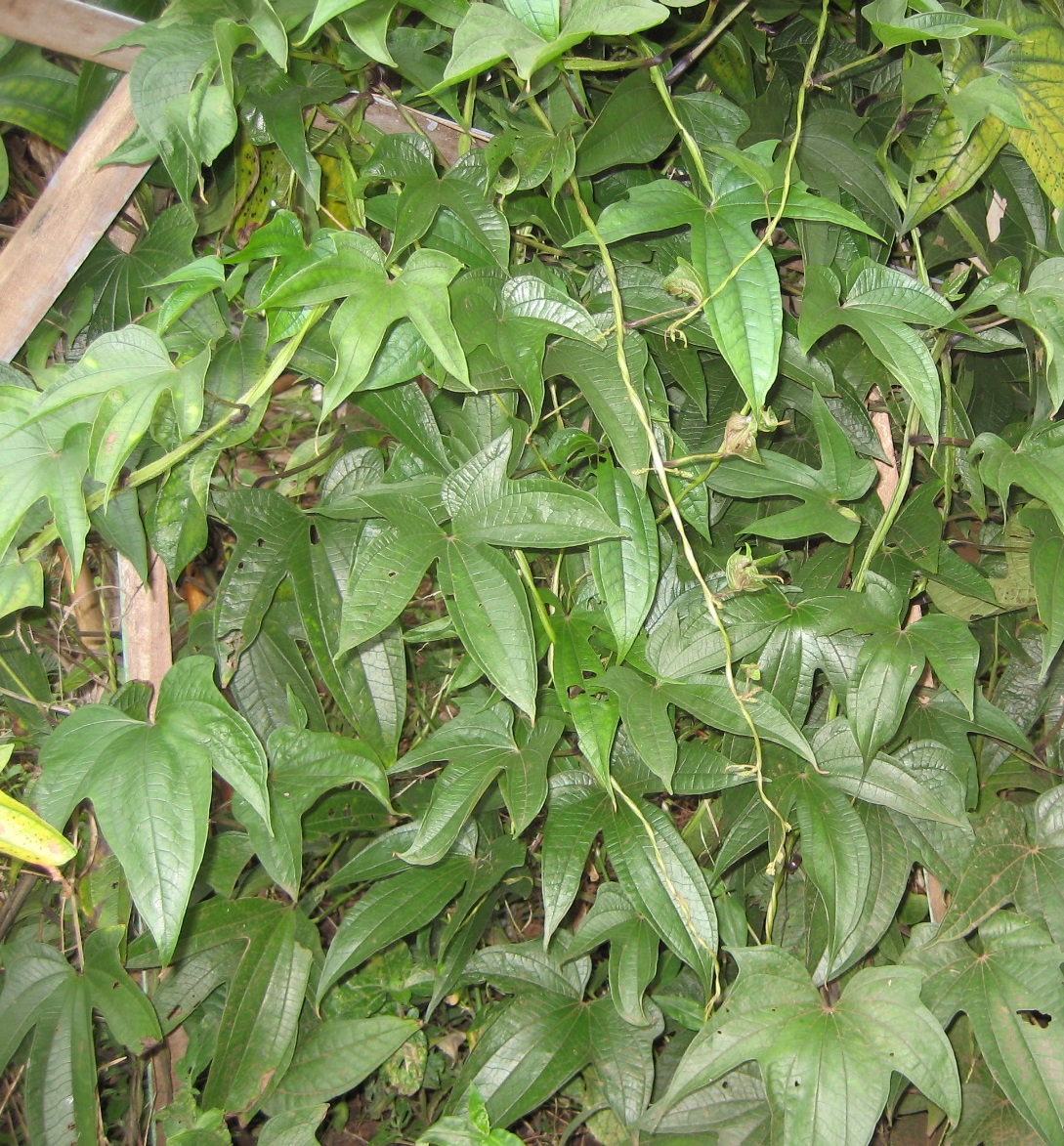

Scientific classification
- Kingdom: Plantae
- Clade: Tracheophytes
- Clade: Angiosperms
- Clade: Monocots
- Order: Dioscoreales
- Family: Dioscoreaceae
- Genus: Dioscorea
- Species: D. trifida

Binomial name
- Dioscorea trifida L.f.

= Dioscorea trifida =

Species of yam

Dioscorea trifida is a species of flowering plant in the family Dioscoreaceae. It is a species of yam (genus Dioscorea). It is native to the Caribbean and Central and South America. Its many common names include Indian yam, cush-cush, yampi and yampee. It is called mapuey in Venezuela, inhame or cará in Brazil, tabena or ñame in Colombia, sacha papa in Peru, and ñampi in Costa Rica.

== Description ==
This plant is a vine that can exceed 3 meters in length. One plant produces up to 12 stems, which are lined with several membranous wings. They emerge from roots with tubers of various shape and size, generally up to 20 centimeters long by 8 wide. The leaves are up to 23 to 30 centimeters long with blades divided into pointed lobes and borne on long, winged petioles. Green flowers with six tiny tepals are borne in the axils. The fruit is a winged, lightly hairy capsule up to about 2.7 centimeters long.

== Uses ==
This is a cultivated yam species used for food in parts of the Americas, especially South America and some Caribbean nations. The starchy tuber has a thin, smooth skin marked with some cracks. It takes different shapes but is commonly spherical or club-shaped, or shaped like a horse hoof, sometimes with a cleft. It comes in various colors, including white, purple, and black. The crop is cultivated like the potato, but must be given a strong trellis for support. It is propagated by planting small tubers or tuber chunks. The crop can be harvested in 10 to 11 months.

The tuber is cooked for food. It can be baked or boiled. In Venezuela and Colombia it is mashed or used in soups. In parts of the Caribbean it is known as "the best of the yams". It is a staple food for some indigenous peoples.

The tuber is about 38% starch. It is a waxy starch that lacks amylose and has potential uses as a binder and thickener in food processing.
