= Interest rate ceiling =

Highest point of an interest rate

An interest rate ceiling (also known as an interest rate cap) is a regulatory measure that prevents banks or other financial institutions from charging more than a certain rate of interest.

== Interest rate caps and their impact on financial inclusion ==
Research was conducted after Zambia reopened an old debate on a lending rate ceiling for banks and other financial institutions. The issue originally came to the fore during the financial liberalisations of the 1990s and again as microfinance increased in prominence with the award of the Nobel Peace Prize to Muhammad Yunus and Grameen Bank in 2006. It was over the appropriateness of regulatory intervention to limit the charging of rates that are deemed, by policymakers, to be excessively high.

A 2013 research paper asked

- Where are interest rate caps currently used, and where have they been used historically?
- What have been the impacts of interest rate caps, particularly on expanding access to financial services?
- What are the alternatives to interest rate caps in reducing spreads in financial markets?

=== Understanding the composition of the interest rate ===
The researcher decided that to assess the appropriateness of an interest rate cap as a policy instrument (or whether other approaches would be more likely to achieve the desired outcomes of government) it was vital to consider what exactly makes up the interest rate and how banks and MFIs are able to justify rates that might be considered excessive.

He found that broadly there were four components to the interest rate:

- Cost of funds
- Overheads
- Losses on non-performing loans
- Profit

==== Cost of funds ====
The cost of funds is the rate of interest that the financial institution must pay to borrow the funds that it then lends out. For a commercial bank or deposit-taking microfinance institution this is usually the interest that it pays on deposits. For other institutions it could be the cost of wholesale funds, or a subsidised rate for credit provided by government or donors. Other MFIs might have very cheap funds from charitable contributions.

==== Overheads ====
The overheads reflect three broad categories of cost:

- Outreach costs: the expansion of a network or development of new products and services
- Processing costs: the cost of credit processing and loan assessment, which is higher with greater information asymmetry.
- General overheads: general administration and overheads associated with running a network of offices and branches

The overheads, and in particular the processing costs, can drive the price differential between larger loans from banks and smaller loans from MFIs. Overheads can vary significantly between lenders, and overheads measured as a proportion of the loans made are an indicator of institutional efficiency.

==== Non-performing loans ====
Lenders must absorb the cost of bad debts and recoup it from the interest rate that they charge. If a lender's credit screening processes improve in future, it should be able to bring down interest rates, while reckless lenders will be penalised.

==== Profit ====
Lenders will include a profit margin that again varies considerably between institutions. Banks and commercial MFIs with shareholders to satisfy are under greater pressure to make profits than NGO or not-for-profit MFIs. Institutions require capital in order to operate, and whatever the source of this capital, the cost of providing it must be recouped.

=== The rationale behind interest rate caps ===
Interest rate caps are used by governments for political and economic reasons, most commonly to provide support to a specific industry or area of the economy. Government may have identified what it considers being a market failure in an industry, or is attempting to force a greater focus of financial resources on that sector than the market would determine.

- Loans to the agricultural sector to boost agricultural productivity as in Bangladesh.
- Loans to credit constrained SMEs as in Zambia.

The researcher found it is also often argued that interest rate ceilings can be justified on the basis that financial institutions are making excessive profits by charging exorbitant interest rates to clients. This is the usury argument and is essentially one of market failure where government intervention is required to protect vulnerable clients from predatory lending practices. The argument, predicated on an assumption that demand for credit at higher rates is price inelastic, postulates financial institutions are able to exploit information asymmetry, and in some cases short run monopoly market power, to the detriment of client welfare. Aggressive collection practices for non-payment of loans have exacerbated the image of certain lenders.

The researcher says that economic theory suggests market imperfections will result from information asymmetry and the inability of lenders to differentiate between safe and risky borrowers. When making a credit decision, a bank or a microfinance institution cannot fully identify a client's potential for repayment.

Two fundamental issues arise:

- Adverse selection - clients that are demonstrably lower risk are likely to have already received some form of credit. Those that remain will either be higher risk, or lower risk but unable to prove it. Unable to differentiate, the bank will charge an aggregated rate which will be more attractive to the higher risk client. This leads to a raised probability of default ex ante.
- Moral hazard - clients borrowing at a higher rate might be required to take more risk (hence higher potential return) to cover their borrowing costs leading to a higher probability of default afterwards.

The researcher claims that traditional ‘microfinance group lending methodology’ helps manage adverse selection risk by using social capital and risk understanding within a community to price risk. However, interest rate controls are most often found at the lower end of the market where financial institutions (usually MFIs) use the information asymmetry to justify high lending rates. In a non-competitive market (as is likely to exist in a remote African village), the lender likely holds the monopoly power to make excessive profit without competition evening them out.

The financial markets will segment so large commercial banks service larger clients with larger loans at lower interest rates and microfinance institutions charge higher rates of interest on a larger volume of low value loans. In between, smaller commercial banks can find a niche serving medium to large enterprises. Inevitably the missing middle, individuals and businesses will be unable to access credit from either banks or MFIs.

The researcher found it intuitive that basic interest rate caps are most likely to bite at the lower end of the market, with interest rates charged by microfinance institutions generally higher than those by banks and this is driven by a higher cost of funds and higher relative overheads. Transaction costs make larger loans relatively more cost effective for the financial institution.

If it costs a commercial bank $100 to make a credit decision on a $10,000 loan then it will factor this 1% into the price of the loan (the interest rate). The cost of loan assessment does not fall in proportion with the loan size and so if a loan of $1,000 still costs $30 to assess, the cost which must be factored in rises to 3%. This cost pushes the higher rates of lending on smaller loans. The higher prices are usually paid because the marginal product of capital is higher for people with little or no access to it.

In implementing a cap, government is aiming to incentivise lenders to push out the supply curve and increase access to credit while bringing down lending rates, assuming the cap is set below the market equilibrium. If above then lenders will continue to lend as before.

The researcher thinks such thinking ignores the actions of the banks and MFIs operating under asymmetric information. The imposition of a maximum price of loans magnifies the problem of adverse selection as the consumer surplus that it creates is a larger pool willing borrowers of unidentifiable creditworthiness.

Faced with this problem, he proposes lenders have three options:

- Increased lending, meaning lending to more bad clients and pushing up NPLs - Increased investment in processing systems to better identify good clients, increasing overheads - Increased investment in outreach to clients, identified as having good repayment potential, increasing overheads

All options increase costs and force the supply curve back to the left, detrimental to financial outreach as the quantity of credit falls. Unless financial service providers can absorb the cost increases while maintaining a profit, they may ration credit to those that they can readily support at the prescribed interest rate, refuse credit to other clients and the market moves.

The researcher asks if the story of interest rate caps leading to credit rationing is borne out in reality?

== The use of interest rate caps ==
Country	Interest Rate Cieling (p.a.)	Notes
Australia	48%	
Canada	35%	
Hong Kong	48%	
Poland	3.5% + reference rate	

Though conceptually simple, there is much variation between the methodologies used by governments to implement limits on lending rates. While some countries use a vanilla interest rate cap written into all regulations for licensed financial institutions, others have attempted a more flexible approach.

The simplest type of interest rate control puts an upper limit on any loans from formal institutions. This might simply say that no financial institution may issue a loan at a rate greater than, say, 40% interest per annum, or 3% per month.

As a more flexible measure, the interest cap is often linked to the base rate set by the central bank in its monetary policy, so that the cap reacts in line with market conditions, rising with monetary tightening and falling with easing. This is the model used in Zambia, where banks are able to lend at nine percentage points over the policy rate and microfinance lending is priced as a multiple of this.

Elsewhere, governments have linked the lending rate to the deposit rate and regulated the spread that banks and deposit-taking MFIs can charge between borrowing and lending rates. As some banks look to get around lending caps by increasing arrangement fees and other charges to the borrower, governments have often tried to limit the total price of the loan. Other governments have attempted to set different caps for different forms of lending instrument.

=== Multi-category caps ===
Rather than setting a rigid interest rate limit, governments in many countries prefer to discriminate between different types of loans and to set individual caps based on the type of borrower and the type of loan. The rationale for this is that it can bite at various levels of the market, minimising consumer surplus.

In South Africa, the National Credit Act (2005) identified eight sub-categories of loan, each with their own prescribed maximum interest rate:

- Mortgages: (RR×2.2)+5% per annum
- Credit facilities: (RR×2.2)+10% per annum
- Unsecured credit transactions: (RR×2.2)+20% per annum
- Developmental credit agreements for the development of a small business: (RR×2.2)+20% per annum
- Developmental credit agreements for low income housing (unsecured): (RR×2.2)+20% per annum
- Short-term transactions: 5% per month
- Other credit agreements: (RR×2.2)+10% per annum
- Incidental credit agreements: 2% per month.

== The impact of interest caps ==
=== Supply side ===
==== Financial outreach ====
The researcher identified the major argument used against the capping of interest rates as them distorting the market and preventing financial institutions from offering loan products to those at the markets lower end with no alternative credit access. This counters the financial outreach agenda prevalent in many poor countries today. He claims the debate boils down to the prioritisation of cost of credit over access to credit. He identifies a randomised experiment in Sri Lanka which found the average real return to capital for microenterprises to be 5.7% per month, well above the typical interest rate of between 2-3% that was provided by MFIs. Similarly, the same authors found in Mexico that returns to capital were an estimated 20-33% per month, up to five times higher than market interest rates.

His paper states that MFIs have historically been able to expand outreach rapidly by funding network expansion with profits from existing borrowers, meaning existing clients are subsidising outreach to new areas. Capping interest rates can hinder this as MFIs may remain profitable in existing markets but cut investment in new markets and at extremes, government action on interest rates can cause existing networks to retract. In Nicaragua, the governments Microfinance Association Law in 2001 limited microloan interest to the average of rates set by the banking system and attempted to legislate for widespread debt forgiveness. In response to perceived persecution by government, a number of MFIs and commercial banks withdrew from certain areas hindering the outreach of the financial sector.

The researcher articulates that there is also evidence to suggest capping lending rates for licensed MFIs incentives, NGO-MFIs, and other finance sources for the poor to stay outside of the regulatory system. In Bolivia, the imposition of a lending cap led to a notable fall in the licensing of new entities, . Keeping lenders out of the system should be unattractive to governments as it increases the potential for predatory lending and lack of consumer protection.

==== Price rises ====
The paper states there is evidence from developed markets that the imposition of price caps could in fact increase the level of interest rates. The researcher came across a study of payday loans in Colorado, the imposition of a price ceiling initially saw reduced interest rates but over a longer period rates steadily rose towards the interest rate cap. This was explained by implicit collusion, by which the price cap set a focal point so that lenders knew that the extent of price rises would be limited and hence collusive behaviour had a limited natural outcome.

=== Demand side ===
==== Elasticity of demand ====
The paper asserts that inherent in any argument for an upper limit on interest rates is an assumption that demand for credit is price inelastic. If the inverse were true, and that market demand was highly sensitive to small rises in lending rates then there would be minimal reason for government or regulators to intervene.

The researcher showed that Karlan and Zinman carried out a randomised control trial in South Africa to test the received wisdom that the poor are relatively non-sensitive to interest rates. They found around lender's standard rates, elasticities of demand rose sharply meaning that even small increases in interest rates lead to a significant fall in the credit demand. If the poor are indeed this responsive to changes in the interest rate, then it suggests that the practice of unethical monetary loans would not be commercially sustainable and hence there is little need for government to cap interest rates.

==== Borrower trends ====
The publication explains that the chain behind implementing an interest cap runs that the cap will have an effect on the wider economy through its impact on consumer and business activities and says the key question to be addressed by any cap is whether it bites and therefore impacts borrower behaviour at the margin.

It gives the case study of South Africa where the National Credit Act was introduced in 2005 to protect consumers and to guard against reckless lending practices by financial institutions. It was a variable cap that discriminated between eight types of lending instrument to ensure the cap bit at different levels.

==== Credit constraints and productivity ====
The researcher observed that an interest cap exacerbates the problem of adverse selection as it restricts lenders’ ability to price discriminate and means that some enterprises that might have received more expensive credit for riskier business ventures will not receive funding. There has been some attempt to link this constraint in the availability of credit to output. In Bangladesh, firms with access to credit were found to be more efficient than firms with a credit constraint. The World Bank found credit constraints may reduce profit margins buy up to 13.6% per year.

=== Are interest rates too high? ===
The paper shows a detailed 2009 study by Consultative Group to Assist the Poor ("CGAP") looked in detail at the four elements of loan pricing for MFIs and attempted to measure whether the poor were indeed being exploited by excessively high interest rates. Their data is interesting for international comparison, but tell us relatively little about efficiency of individual companies and markets. However they do provide some interesting and positive conclusions, for example, the ratio of operating expenses to total loan portfolio declined from 15.6% in 2003 to 12.7% in 2006, a trend likely to have been driven by the twin factors of competition and learning by doing.

The researcher mentions profitability as there is some evidence of MFIs generating very high profits from microfinance clients. The most famous case was the IPO of Compartamos, a Mexican microfinance organisation that generated millions of dollars in profit for its shareholders. Compartamos had been accused of immoral money lending (usury), charging clients annualised rates in excess of 85%. The CGAP study found that the most profitable ten percent of MFIs globally were making returns on equity in excess of 35%.

He proposes that while the international comparison is interesting, it also has practical implications. It provides policymakers with a conceptual framework with which to assess the appropriateness of intervention in credit markets. The question that policymakers must answer if they are to justify interfering in the market and capping interest rates is whether excessive profits or bloated overheads are pushing interest rates to a higher rate than their natural level. This is a subjective regulatory question, and the aim of a policy framework should be to ensure sufficient contestability to keep profits in check before the need for intervention arises.

== Alternative methods of reducing interest rate spreads ==
He states that from an economic perspective, input based solutions like interest rate caps or subsidies distort the market and hence it would better to let the market determine the interest rate, and to support certain desirable sectors through other means such as output-based aid. Indeed, there are a number of other methods available that can contribute to a reduction in interest rates.

In the short term, soft pressure can be an effective tool – as banks and MFIs need licenses to operate, they are often receptive to influence from the central bank or regulatory authority. However to truly bring down interest rates sustainably, governments need to build a business and regulatory environment and support structures that encourage the supply of financial services at lower cost and hence push the supply curve to the right.

=== Market structure ===
The paper shows that the paradigm of classical economics runs that competition between financial institutions should force them to compete on the price of loans that they provide and hence bring down interest rates. Competitive forces can certainly play a role in forces lenders to either improve efficiency in order to bring down overheads, or to cut profit margins. In a survey of MFI managers in Latin America and the Caribbean, competition was cited as the largest factor determining the interest rate that they charged. The macro evidence supports this view – Latin countries with the most competitive microfinance industries, such as Bolivia and Peru, generally have the lowest interest rates.

The corollary of this, and the orthodox view, would seem to be that governments should license more financial institutions to promote competition and drive down rates. However it is not certain that more players means greater competition. Due to the nature of the financial sector, with high fixed costs and capital requirements, smaller players might be forced to levy higher rates in order to remain profitable. Weak businesses that are inefficiently run will not necessarily add value to an industry and government support can often be misdirected to supporting bad businesses. Governments should be willing to adapt and base policy on a thorough analysis of the market structure, with the promotion of competition, and the removal of unnecessary barriers to entry such as excessive red tape, as a goal.

=== Market information ===
The evidence the researcher suggests that learning by doing is a key factor in building up efficiency and hence lowering overheads and hence interest rates. Institutions with a decent track record are better able to control costs and more efficient at evaluating loans while a larger loan book will generate economies of scale. More established businesses should also be able to renegotiate and source cheaper funds, again bringing down costs. In China, the government supports the financial sector by setting a ceiling on deposits and a floor on lending rates meaning that banks are able to sustain a minimum level of margin. Following an international sample of MFIs, there is clear evidence from the Microfinance Information Exchange (MIX) that operating expenses fell as a proportion of gross loan portfolio as businesses matured.

The implication of this is that governments would be better off addressing the cost structures of financial institutions to allow them to remain commercially sustainable in the longer term. For example, government investment in credit reference bureaus and collateral agencies decreases the costs of loan appraisal for banks and MFIs. Supporting product innovation, for example through the use of a financial sector challenge fund, can bring down the cost of outreach and government support for research and advocacy can lead to the development of demand-led products and services. The FinMark Trust is an example of donor funds supporting the development of research and analysis as a tool for influencing policy.

=== Demand side support ===
The researcher states that Government can help to push down interest rates by promoting transparency and financial consumer protection. Investment in financial literacy can strengthen the voice of the borrower and protect against possible exploitation. Forcing regulated financial institutions to be transparent in their lending practices means that consumers are protected from hidden costs. Government can publish and advertise lending rates of competing banks to increase competition. Any demand side work is likely to have a long lead time to impact but it is vital that even if the supply curve does shift to the right that the demand curve follows it.

== Conclusion ==
The researcher concludes that there are situations when an interest rate cap may be a good policy decision for governments. Where insufficient credit is being provided to a particular industry that is of strategic importance to the economy, interest rate caps can be a short-term solution. While often used for political rather than economic purposes, they can help to kick start a sector or incubate it from market forces for a period of time until it is commercially sustainable without government support. They can also promote fairness – as long as a cap is set at a high enough level to allow for profitable lending for efficient financial institutions to SMEs, it can protect consumers from usury without significantly impacting outreach. Additionally, financial outreach is not an end in itself and greater economic and social impact might result from cheaper credit in certain sectors rather than greater outreach. Where lenders are known to be very profitable then it might be possible to force them to lend at lower rates in the knowledge that the costs can be absorbed into their profit margins. Caps on interest rates also protect against usurious lending practices and can be used to guard against the exploitation of vulnerable members of society.

However, he does say that although there are undoubtedly market failures in credit markets, and government does have a role in managing these market failures (and indeed supporting certain sectors), interest rate caps are ultimately an inefficient way of reaching the goal of lower long-term interest rates. This is because they address the symptom, not the cause of financial market failures. In order to bring down rates sustainably, it is likely that governments will need to act more systemically, addressing issues in market information and market structure and on the demand side and ultimately supporting a deeper level of financial sector reform.
