= Price ceiling =

Method of price control

A price ceiling or price cap is a government- or group-imposed price control, or limit, on how high a price is charged for a product, commodity, or service. Governments impose price ceilings to protect consumers from conditions that could make commodities prohibitively expensive. Economists generally agree that consumer price controls do not accomplish what they intend to in market economies, and many economists instead recommend such controls should be avoided.

While price ceilings are often imposed by governments, there are also price ceilings that are implemented by non-governmental organizations such as companies, such as the practice of resale price maintenance. With resale price maintenance, a manufacturer and its distributors agree that the distributors will sell the manufacturer's product at certain prices (resale price maintenance), at or below a price ceiling (maximum resale price maintenance) or at or above a price floor.

== Support ==
Isabella Weber and her colleagues argue for price caps to combat sellers' inflation.

Paul Krugman changed his mind and expressed interest in adding price caps to the toolkit to fight inflation.

== Criticism ==
Pricing, quantity, and welfare effects of a binding price ceiling

There is a substantial body of research showing that under some circumstances price ceilings can, paradoxically, lead to higher prices. The leading explanation is that price ceilings serve to coordinate collusion among suppliers who would otherwise compete on price. More precisely, the formation of a cartel becomes profitable by enabling nominally competing firms to act like a monopoly, limiting quantities and raising prices. However, forming a cartel is difficult because it is necessary to agree on quantities and prices, and because each firm will have an incentive to "cheat" by lowering prices to sell more than it agreed to. Antitrust laws make collusion even more difficult because of legal sanctions. Having a third party, such as a regulator, announce and enforce a maximum price level can make it easier for the firms to agree on a price and to monitor pricing. The regulatory price can be viewed as a focal point, which is natural for both parties to charge.

One research paper documenting the phenomenon is Knittel and Stangel, which found that in the 1980s United States, states that fixed an interest rate ceiling of 18 percent had firms charging a rate only slightly below the ceiling. States without an interest rate ceiling had interest rates that were significantly lower. The authors did not find any difference in costs that could explain the result.

== Examples ==
=== Australia ===
Uniform wage ceilings were introduced in Australian rules football to address uneven competition for players. In the Victorian Football League (VFL) a declining competitive balance followed a 1925 expansion that had affected clubs such as Footscray, Hawthorn and North Melbourne. The effects on financially weaker clubs were exacerbated in 1929 by the beginning of the Great Depression. In 1930, a new ceiling system, formulated by VFL administrator George Coulter, stipulated that individual players were to be paid no more than A£3 (approximately A$243 in 2017) for a regular home-and-away match, that they must also be paid if they were injured, that they could be paid no more than A£12 (approximately A$975 in 2017) for a finals match, and that the wages could not be augmented with other bonuses or lump-sum payments. The "Coulter law", as it became known, remained a strictly binding price ceiling through its history.

During its early years, the Coulter law adversely affected only a minority of players, such as stars and players at wealthier clubs. Those individuals experienced, in effect, a drastic cut in wages. For instance, from 1931 the ceiling payment of £3 per game fell below the legal minimum award wage. While players at the more successful clubs of the day, such as Richmond, had previously paid significantly higher average wages, clubs that were struggling financially often could not meet the ceiling under the Coulter law. Clubs with a longstanding amateur ethos became significantly more competitive under the Coulter law, such as Melbourne, which had long attracted and retained players by indirect or non-financial incentives (such as finding players employment not related to football). The Coulter law led to at least one VFL star of the 1930s, Ron Todd, moving to the rival VFA, because he was dissatisfied with the maximum pay that he could receive at Collingwood.

As a result of World War II, the wage for a regular game was halved (to £1 and 10 shillings) for the 1942–45 seasons. After the war, the ceilings were modified several times in line with inflation. During the 1950s, the "Coulter law" was also blamed for shortening the careers of star players such as John Coleman and Brian Gleeson, as they and their clubs could not pay for the private surgery that the players required to continue their careers. The Coulter law was abolished in 1968. However, in 1987 a club-level salary cap was introduced by the VFL and has been retained by its successor, the Australian Football League (AFL).

=== Canada ===
A paper by Sen et al. found that gasoline prices in cities were higher in Canadian provinces that instituted price ceilings.

=== China ===
The Chinese government has periodically introduced price ceilings on various goods, including medication and cell phones

In the pharmaceutical industry, a study by Li and Wu found that the introduction of national price ceilings on some pharmaceuticals had mixed results; prices declined for most consumers, but rose for some others as prices were largely set based on the national price ceiling, even in lower-income areas where the prices had been lower before the imposition of a price ceiling. Approximately 5% of the studied drugs experienced overall price inflation following the imposition of price controls. Drugs with manufacturer-specific price controls were found to be significantly more likely to be priced at or near the price ceiling, and were also likely to have lower prices following the removal of the price ceiling.

From 2008 to 2012, the Chinese government introduced the Home Appliances Going to the Countryside programme, which provided rebates for consumers in certain rural areas to purchase eligible appliances; a price ceiling, set based on the province, was a condition for eligibility. A study found that competition for eligibility successfully mitigated price increases that normally accompany government rebates for goods.

=== Finland ===
According to professors Niko Määttänen and Ari Hyytinen, price ceilings on Helsinki City Hitas apartments are highly inefficient economically. They cause queuing and discriminate against the handicapped, single parents, elderly, and others who are not able to queue for days. They cause inefficient allocation, as apartments are not bought by those willing to pay the most for them. Also, those who get an apartment are unwilling to leave it, even when their family or work situation changes, as they may not sell it at what they feel the market price should be. The inefficiencies increase apartment shortage and raise the market price of other apartments.

=== Pakistan ===
Another example is the Supreme Court of Pakistan decision regarding fixing a ceiling price for sugar at 45 Pakistani rupees per kilogram. Sugar disappeared from the market because of a cartel of sugar producers and the failure of the Pakistani government to maintain supply even in the stores that it owned. The imported sugar required time to reach the country, and it could be sold at the rate fixed by the Supreme Court of Pakistan. Eventually, the government went for a review petition in the Supreme Court and obtained the withdrawal of the earlier decision of the apex court. The market equilibrium was achieved at 55 to 60 rupees per kilogram.

=== United Kingdom ===
The Domestic Gas and Electricity (Tariff Cap) Act 2018 (c. 21) introduced a default tariff energy price cap in England, Wales and Scotland as part of the UK's energy policy, to safeguard the 11 million households on standard variable tariffs.

=== United States ===
==== Rent control ====
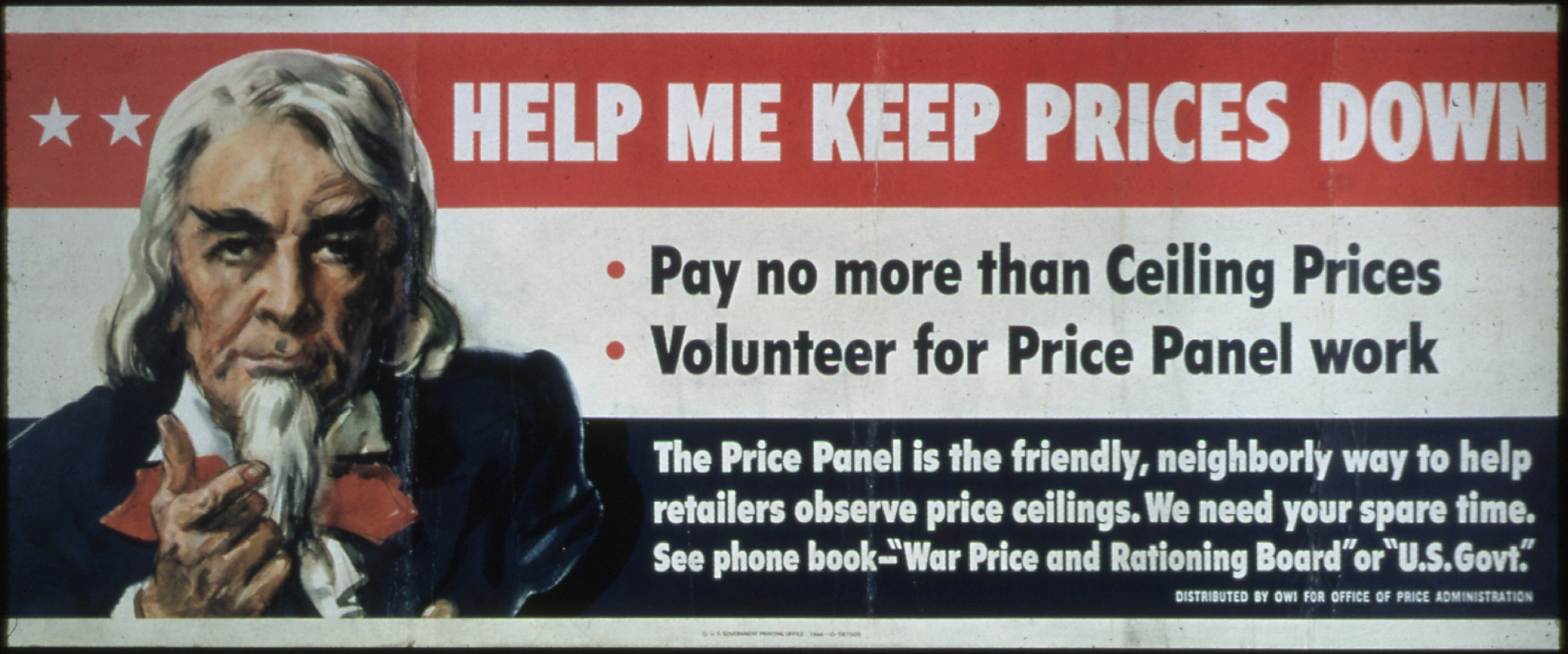
"Pay no more than Ceiling Price," US poster during World War II

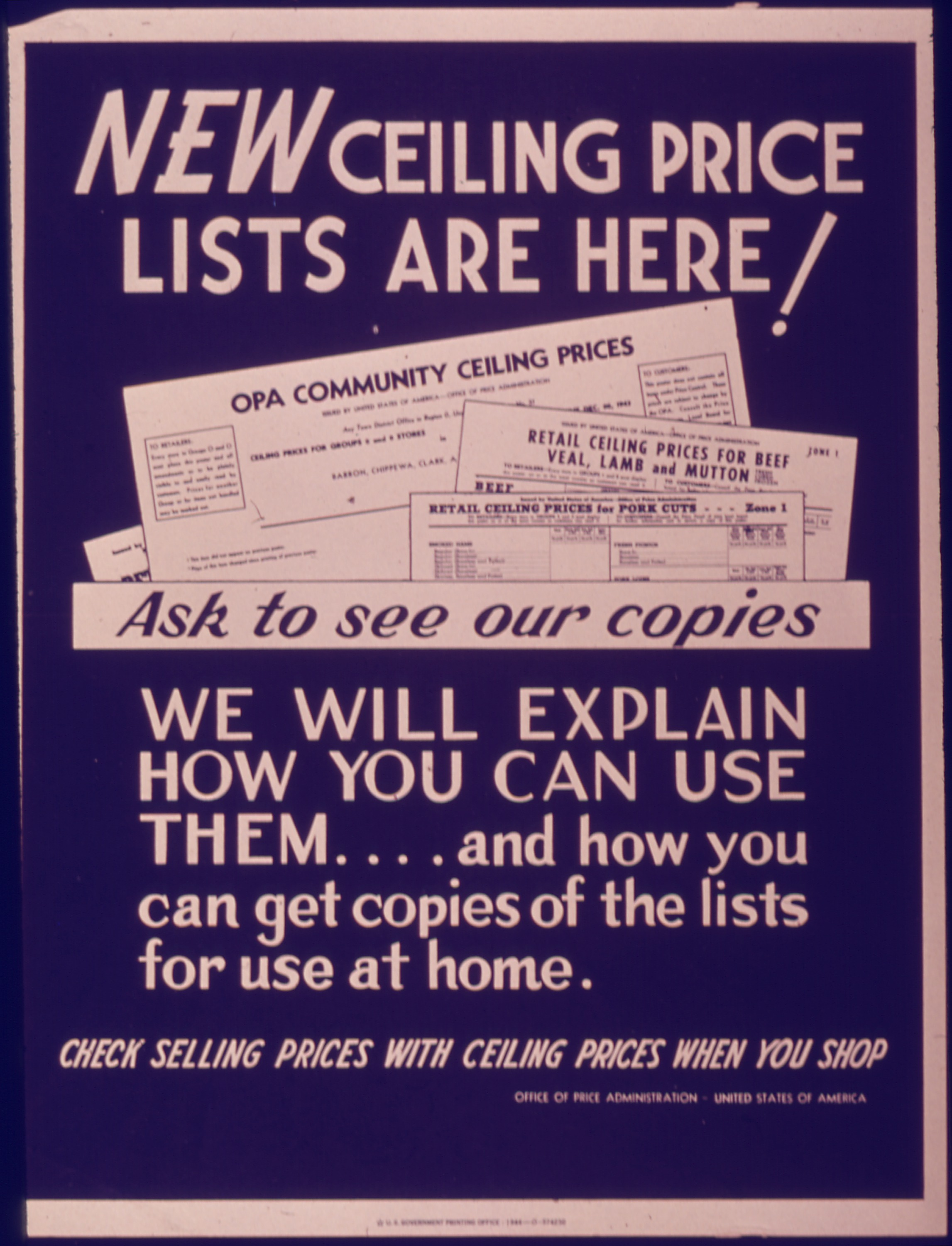
"New ceiling price lists are here," US Office of Price Administration during World War II

Rent controls were instituted in the US in the 1940s by then-president Franklin D. Roosevelt and his newly-formed Office of Price Administration. The Office instituted price ceilings on a wide range of commodities, including rent controls that allowed returning World War II veterans and their families to afford housing. Following the predictions of economic models, this policy lowered the supply of rentable properties available to veterans. At the same time, there was an increase in homeownership and the number of homes for sale. This outcome could be explained by landowners converting their rentable property to sellable property, due to the financial unviability of rental markets and no incentive by the landowner to destroy their property or leave it vacant.

==== Home insurance ====
On February 4, 2009, a Wall Street Journal article stated, "Last month State Farm pulled the plug on its 1.2 million homeowner policies in Florida, citing the state's punishing price controls.... State Farm's local subsidiary recently requested an increase of 47%, but state regulators refused. State Farm says that since 2000, it has paid $1.21 in claims and expenses for every $1 of premium income received."

=== Venezuela ===
On January 10, 2006, a BBC article reported that since 2003, Venezuela President Hugo Chávez had been setting price ceilings on food and that the price ceilings had caused shortages and hoarding. A January 22, 2008, article from Associated Press stated, "Venezuelan troops are cracking down on the smuggling of food... the National Guard has seized about 750 tons of food.... Hugo Chavez ordered the military to keep people from smuggling scarce items like milk.... He's also threatened to seize farms and milk plants...." On February 28, 2009, Chávez ordered the military to seize control of all the rice processing plants in the country temporarily and to force them to produce at full capacity. He alleged they had been avoiding doing so in response to the price caps.

On January 3, 2007, an International Herald Tribune article reported that Chávez's price ceilings were causing shortages of materials used in the construction industry. According to an April 4, 2008, article from CBS News, Chávez ordered the nationalization of the cement industry, which had been exporting its products to receive higher prices outside the country.

== See also ==
- Black market
- General equilibrium
- Pricing science
- Pricing strategies
