= Yam (vegetable) =

Edible starchy tuber

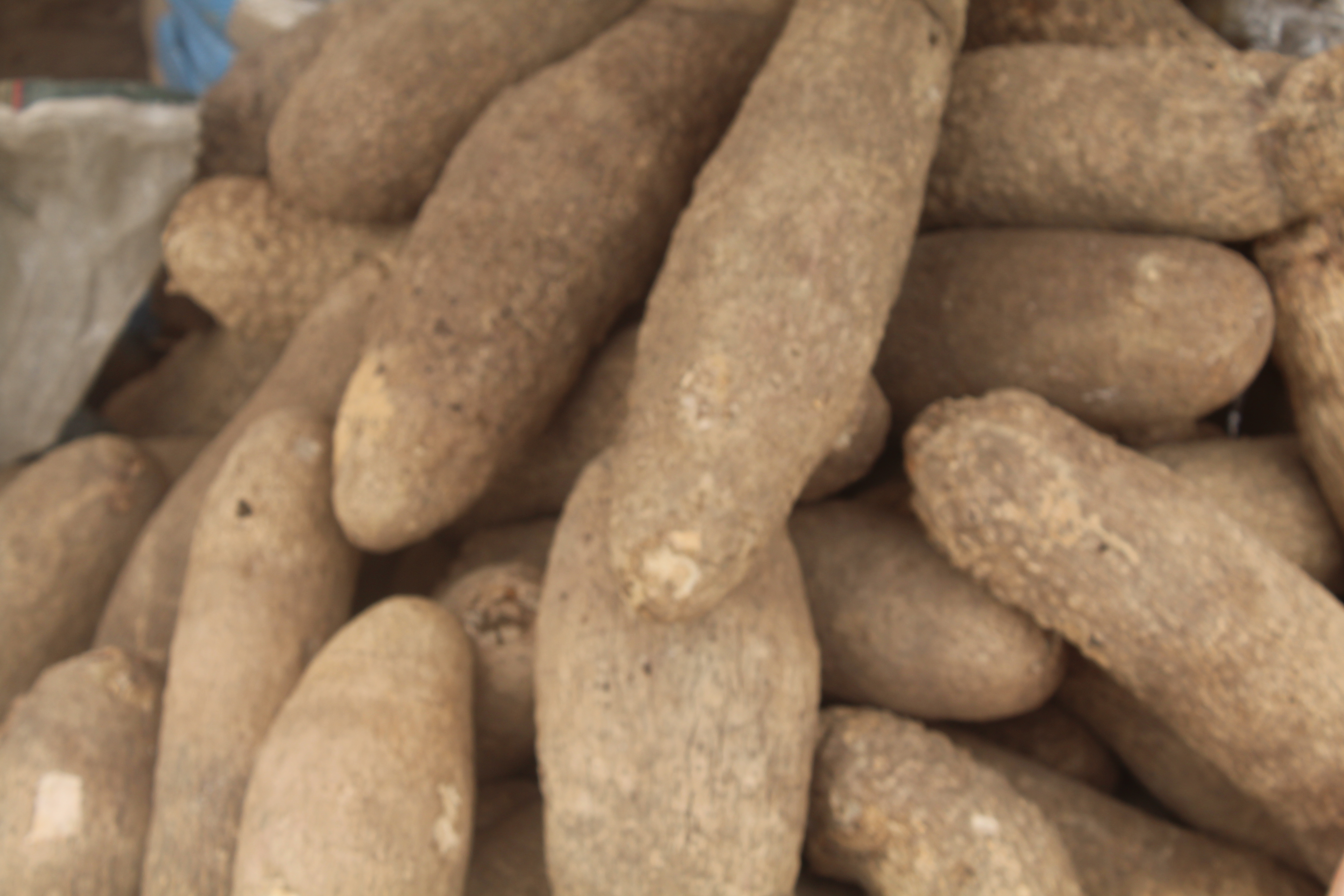
White yam variety, Dioscorea rotundata in local monday market in Kaduna, Nigeria

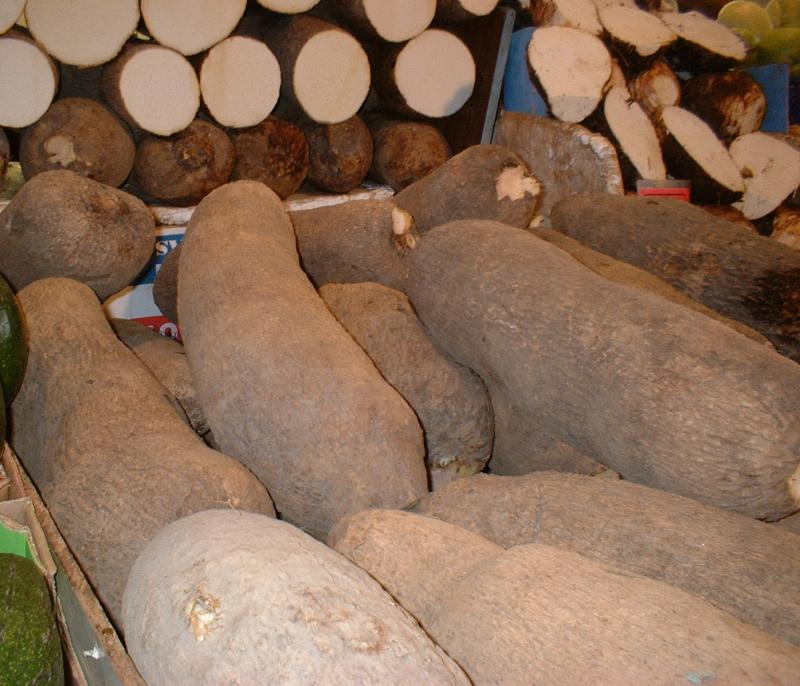
White yams at a retail market in Brixton, UK, 2004

Yam is the common name for some plant species in the genus Dioscorea (family Dioscoreaceae) that form edible tubers (some other species in the genus being toxic).

Yams are perennial herbaceous vines native to Africa, Asia, and the Americas and cultivated for the consumption of their starchy tubers in many temperate and tropical regions. The tubers themselves, also called "yams", come in a variety of forms owing to numerous cultivars and related species.

== Description ==
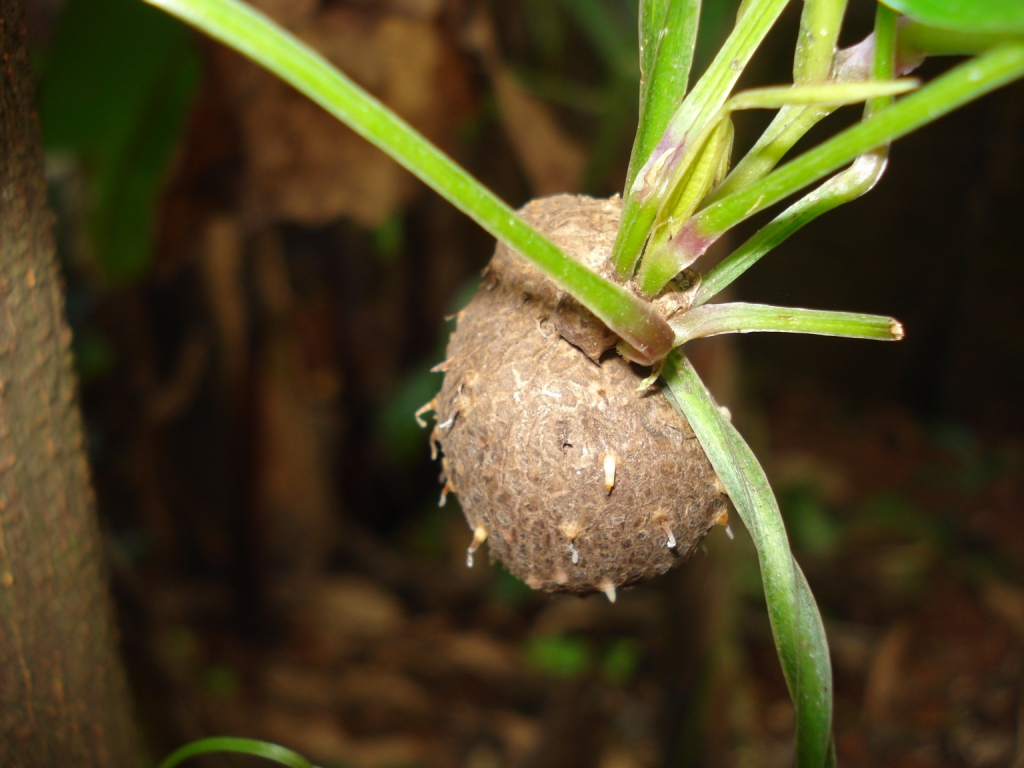
A yam

A monocot distantly related to lilies and grasses, yams are vigorous herbaceous, perennially growing vines from a tuber. Some 870 species of yams are known, a few of which are widely grown for their edible tuber but others of which are toxic (such as D. communis).

Yam plants can grow up to 15 metres (50 feet) in length and 7 to 15 centimetres (3 to 6 inches) high. The tuber may grow into the soil up to 1.5 m (5 ft) deep. The plant disperses by seed.

The edible tuber has a rough skin that is difficult to peel but readily softened by cooking. The skins vary in color from dark brown to light pink. The majority, or meat, of the vegetable is composed of a much softer substance ranging in color from white or yellow to purple or pink in mature yams.

== Etymology ==
The name "yam" appears to derive from Portuguese inhame or Canarian Spanish ñame, which derived from Fula, one of the West African languages during trade. However, in Portuguese, this name commonly refers to the taro plant (Colocasia esculenta) from the genus Colocasia, as opposed to Dioscorea.

The main derivations borrow from verbs meaning "to eat". True yams have various common names across multiple world regions.

In some places, other (unrelated) root vegetables are sometimes referred to as "yams", including:

- In the United States, sweet potatoes (Ipomoea batatas), especially those with orange flesh, are often referred to as "yams"
- In Australia, the tubers of the Microseris walteri, or yam daisy, were a staple food of Aboriginal Australians in some regions.
- In New Zealand, oca (Oxalis tuberosa) is typically referred to as "yam".
- In Malaysia and Singapore, taro (Colocasia esculenta) is referred to as "yam".
- In Africa, South and Southeast Asia as well as the tropical Pacific islands Amorphophallus paeoniifolius is grown and known as "elephant foot yam".

== Distribution and habitat ==
Yams are native to Africa, Asia, and the Americas. Three species were independently domesticated on those continents: D. rotundata (Africa), D. alata (Asia), and D. trifida (South America).

== Ecology ==
Some yams are invasive plants, often considered a noxious weed outside cultivated areas.

== Cultivation ==
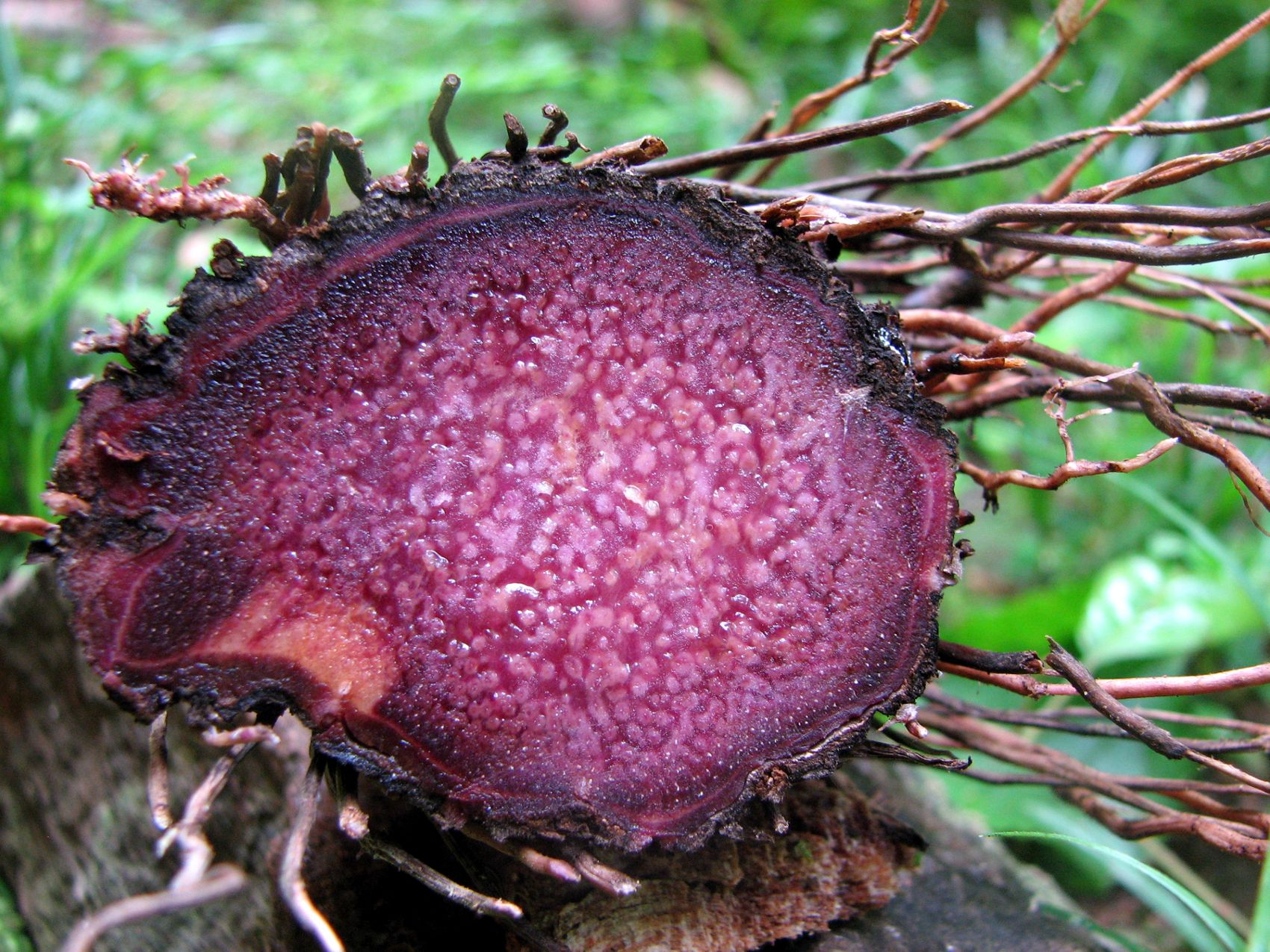
Freshly harvested purple yam (D. alata) sliced for cross-section

Yams are cultivated for the consumption of their starchy tubers in many temperate and tropical regions, especially in West Africa, South America and the Caribbean, Asia, and Oceania. About 95% of yam crops are grown in Africa.

A yam crop begins when whole seed tubers or tuber portions are planted into mounds or ridges, at the beginning of the rainy season. The crop yield depends on how and where the sets are planted, sizes of mounds, interplant spacing, provision of stakes for the resultant plants, yam species, and tuber sizes desired at harvest. Small-scale farmers in West and Central Africa often intercrop yams with cereals and vegetables. The seed yams are perishable and bulky to transport. Farmers who do not buy new seed yams usually set aside up to 30% of their harvest for planting the next year. Yam crops face pressure from a range of insect pests and fungal and viral diseases, as well as nematodes. Their growth and dormant phases correspond respectively to the wet season and the dry season. For maximum yield, the yams require a humid tropical environment, with an annual rainfall over 1,500 millimetres (59 in) distributed uniformly throughout the growing season. White, yellow, and water yams typically produce a single large tuber per year, generally weighing 5 to 10 kilograms (11 to 22 pounds).

Yams suffer from relatively few pests and diseases. There is an anthracnose caused by Colletotrichum gloeosporioides which is widely distributed around the world's growing regions. Winch et al., 1984 finds C. gloeosporioides afflicts a large number of Dioscorea spp.

Despite the high labor requirements and production costs, consumer demand for yam is high in certain subregions of Africa, making yam cultivation quite profitable to certain farmers.

=== Major cultivated species ===
Many cultivated species of Dioscorea yams are found throughout the humid tropics. The most economically important are discussed below.

Non-Dioscorea tubers that were historically important in Africa include Plectranthus rotundifolius (the Hausa potato) and P. esculentus (the Livingstone potato); these two tuber crops have now been largely displaced by the introduction of cassava.

==== D. cayennensis ====
The yellow yam, D. cayenensis, and the white yam, D. cayenensis subsp. rotundata, are native to Africa. They are the most important cultivated yams. In the past, the white yam was considered to be a separate species, D. rotundata, but most taxonomists now regard it as a subspecies of yellow yam. Over 200 varieties between them are cultivated.

White yam tuber is roughly cylindrical in shape, the skin is smooth and brown, and the flesh is usually white and firm. Yellow yam has yellow flesh, caused by the presence of carotenoids. It looks similar to the white yam in outer appearance; its tuber skin is usually a bit firmer and less extensively grooved. The yellow yam has a longer period of vegetation and a shorter dormancy than white yam.

The Kokoro variety is important in making dried yam chips.

They are large plants; the vines can be as long as 10 to 12 m (33 to 39 ft). The tubers most often weigh about 2.5 to 5 kg (6 to 11 lb) each, but can weigh as much as 25 kg (55 lb). After 7 to 12 months' growth, the tubers are harvested. In Africa, most are pounded into a paste to make the traditional dish of "pounded yam", known as Iyan.

==== D. alata ====
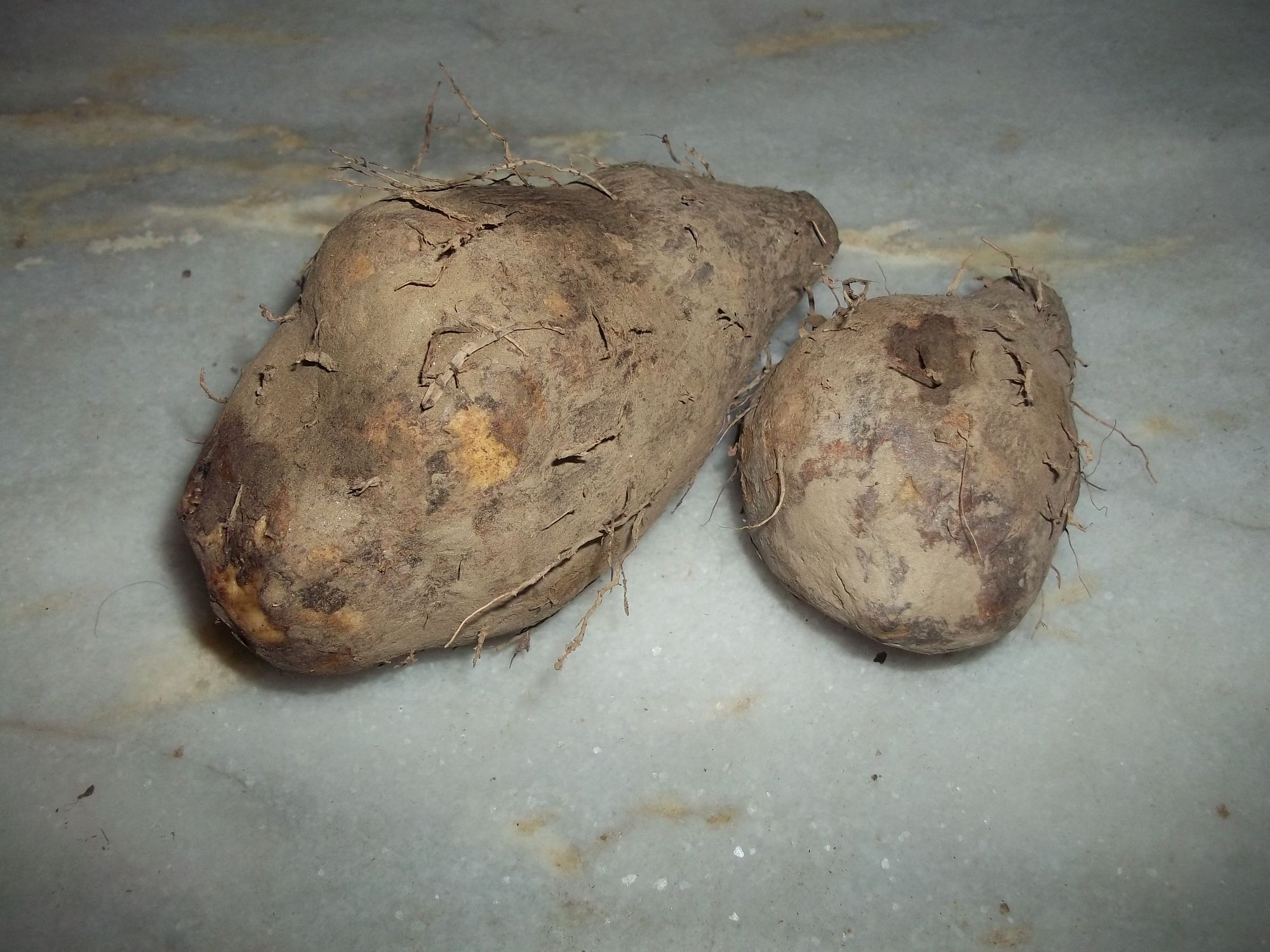
Purple yam (D. alata)

D. alata, called purple yam (not to be confused with the Okinawan purple "yam", which is a sweet potato), greater yam, winged yam, water yam, and (ambiguously) white yam, was first cultivated in Southeast Asia. Although not grown in the same quantities as the African yams, it has the largest distribution worldwide of any cultivated yam, being grown in Asia, the Pacific islands, Africa, and the West Indies. Even in Africa, the popularity of water yam is second only to white yam. The tuber shape is generally cylindrical, but can vary. Tuber flesh is white and watery in texture.

D. alata and D. esculenta (lesser yam) were important staple crops to the seafaring Austronesian cultures. They were carried along with the Austronesian migrations as canoe plants, from Island Southeast Asia to as far as Madagascar and Polynesia.

==== D. polystachya ====
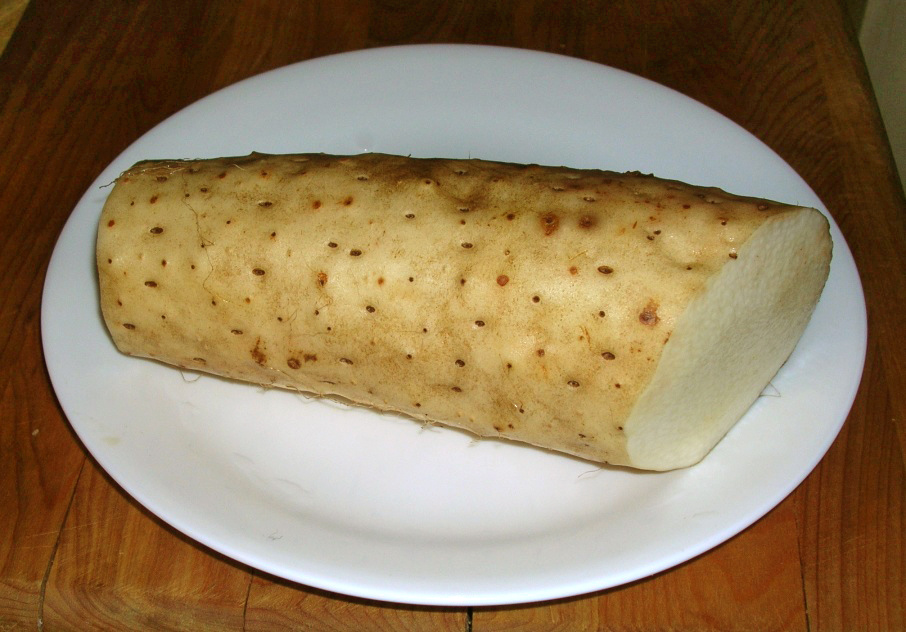
Chinese yam (D. polystachya)

Dioscorea polystachya, the Chinese yam, is native to temperate East Asia, from the southern Russian Far East through China to Taiwan and the Kuril Islands; Korea is also treated as part of the native range.It has long been cultivated in Japan, where it is generally regarded as an introduction of the 17th century or earlier.The plant is smaller than most African yams; the vines typically climb 3–5 m (10–16 ft), and it is more frost-tolerant than other edible yams, growing in cooler temperate climates than most cultivated species. It was introduced to Europe in the 19th century during the European Potato Failure, as a possible substitute crop; limited cultivation continues in France for the East Asian food market."Chinese yam". Wikipedia.

Regional cultivars differ in morphology and in how the tuber is used. In China, types are distinguished mainly by tuber shape (cylindrical, flattened, or round). Henan—especially the Jiaozuo (historical Huaiqing) area and the tiegun ('iron stick') strain—is the traditional prestige production region; tubers are eaten cooked, typically stir-fried or added to soups, and are also sliced and dried for use in traditional medicine as shān yào (山藥).

In Korea the crop is grown nationwide, with Andong in North Gyeongsang accounting for the bulk of output (commonly cited at around 70 percent) and Jinju as a long-standing secondary centre. Andong san-yak (산약) was used almost exclusively as a raw material for traditional medicine until the late 1980s; commercial processing infrastructure developed subsequently, and today it is marketed primarily as a health product—dried, powdered, or made into tonic drinks—rather than sold as a fresh table vegetable.

In Japan, by contrast, the crop is stocked as an ordinary supermarket vegetable alongside potatoes, onions, and carrots, and cultivars are grouped by tuber shape into several named types (see Yam § Japan for details). Unusually among East Asian yams, they are commonly eaten raw, grated into tororo.

==== D. bulbifera ====
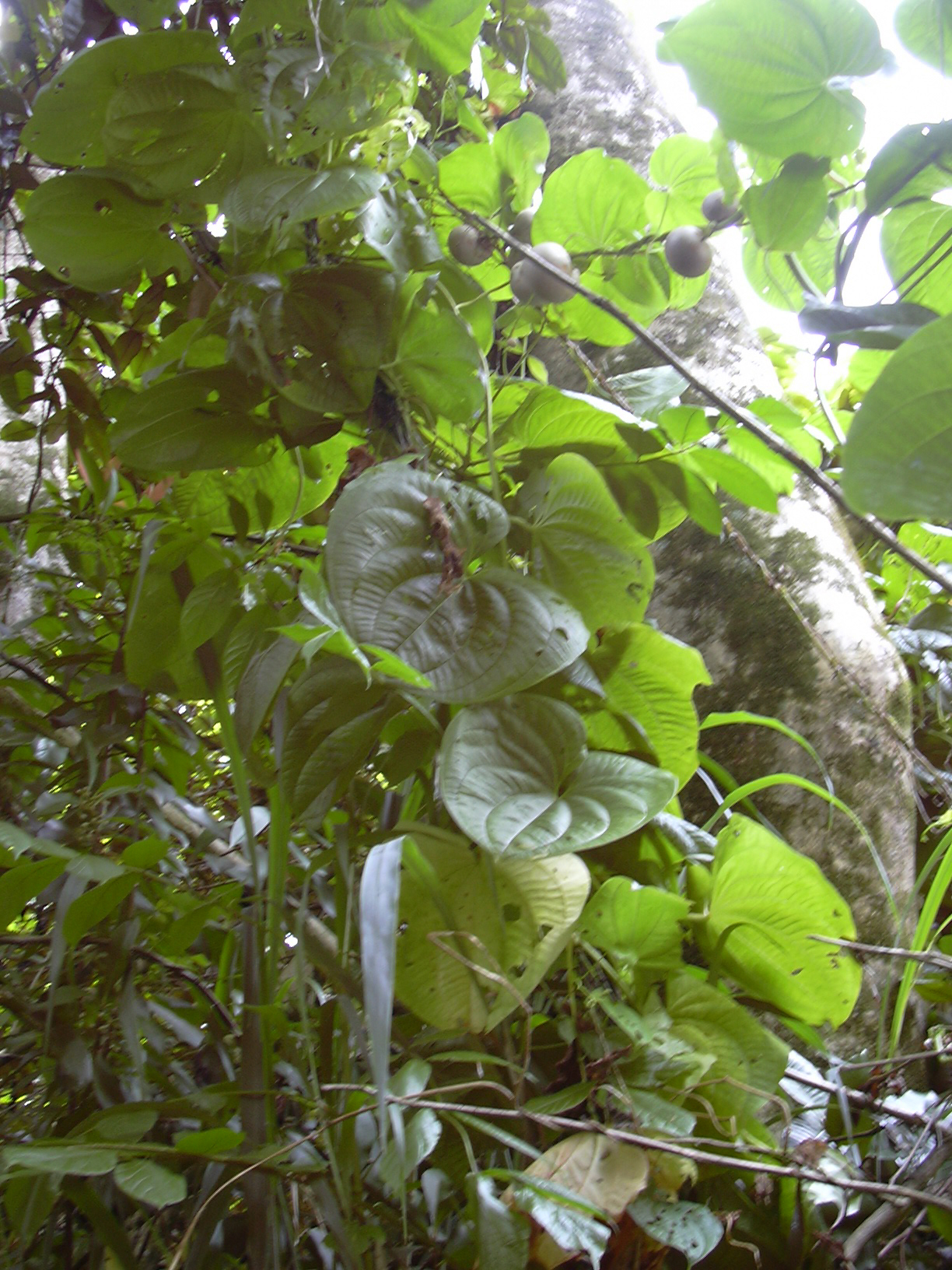
Air potato (D. bulbifera)

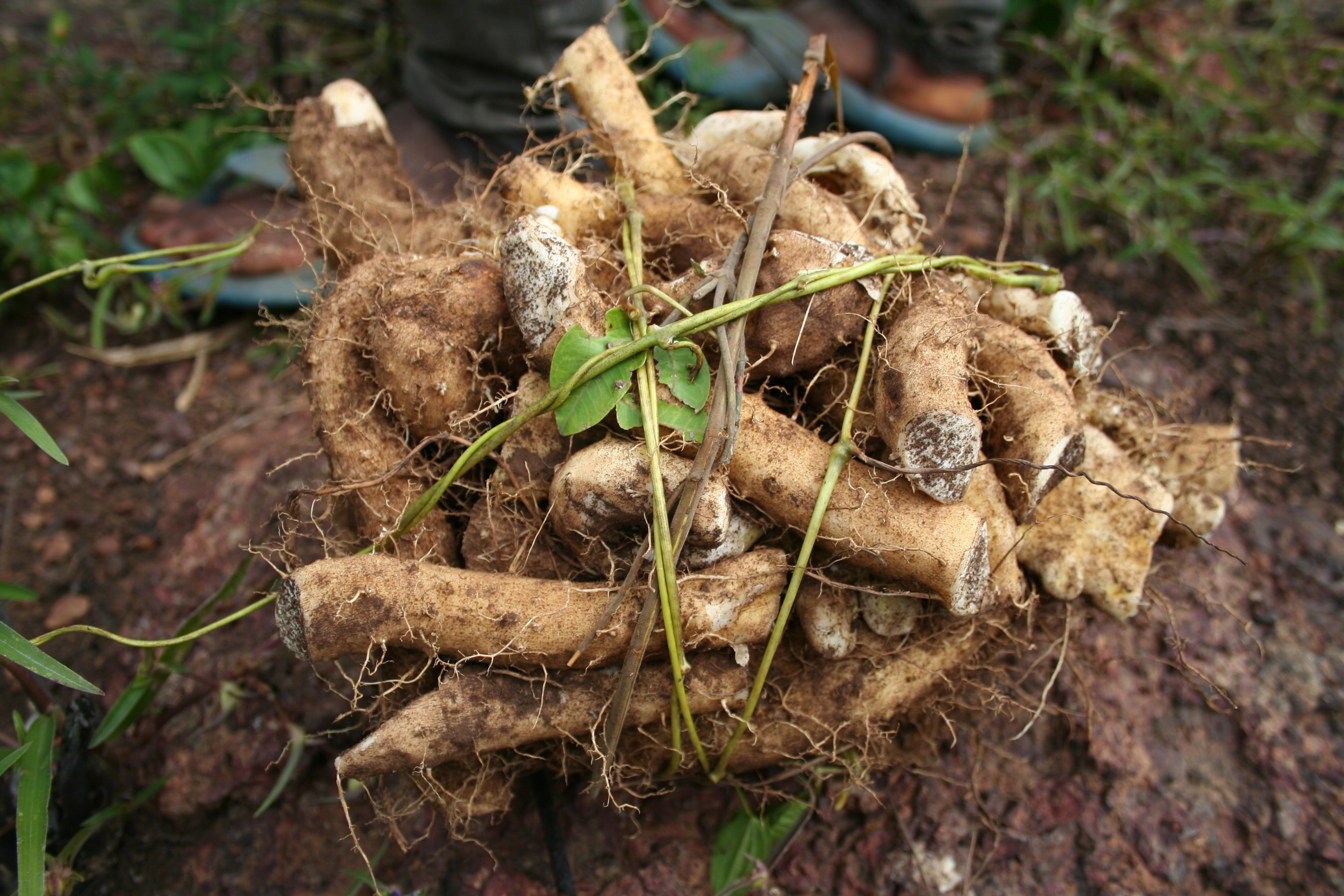
Wild yam (D. sp.)

D. bulbifera, the air potato, is found in both Africa and Asia, with slight differences between those found in each place. It is a large vine, 6 m (20 ft) or more in length. It produces tubers, but the bulbils which grow at the base of its leaves are the more important food product. They are about the size of potatoes (hence the name "air potato"), weighing from 0.5 to 2.0 kg (1 lb 2 oz to 4 lb 7 oz).

Some varieties can be eaten raw, while some require soaking or boiling for detoxification before eating. It is not grown much commercially since the flavor of other yams is preferred by most people. However, it is popular in home vegetable gardens because it produces a crop after only four months of growth and continues producing for the life of the vine, as long as two years. Also, the bulbils are easy to harvest and cook.

In 1905, the air potato was introduced to Florida and has since become an invasive species in much of the state. Its rapid growth crowds out native vegetation and it is very difficult to remove since it can grow back from the tubers, and new vines can grow from the bulbils even after being cut down or burned.

==== D. esculenta ====
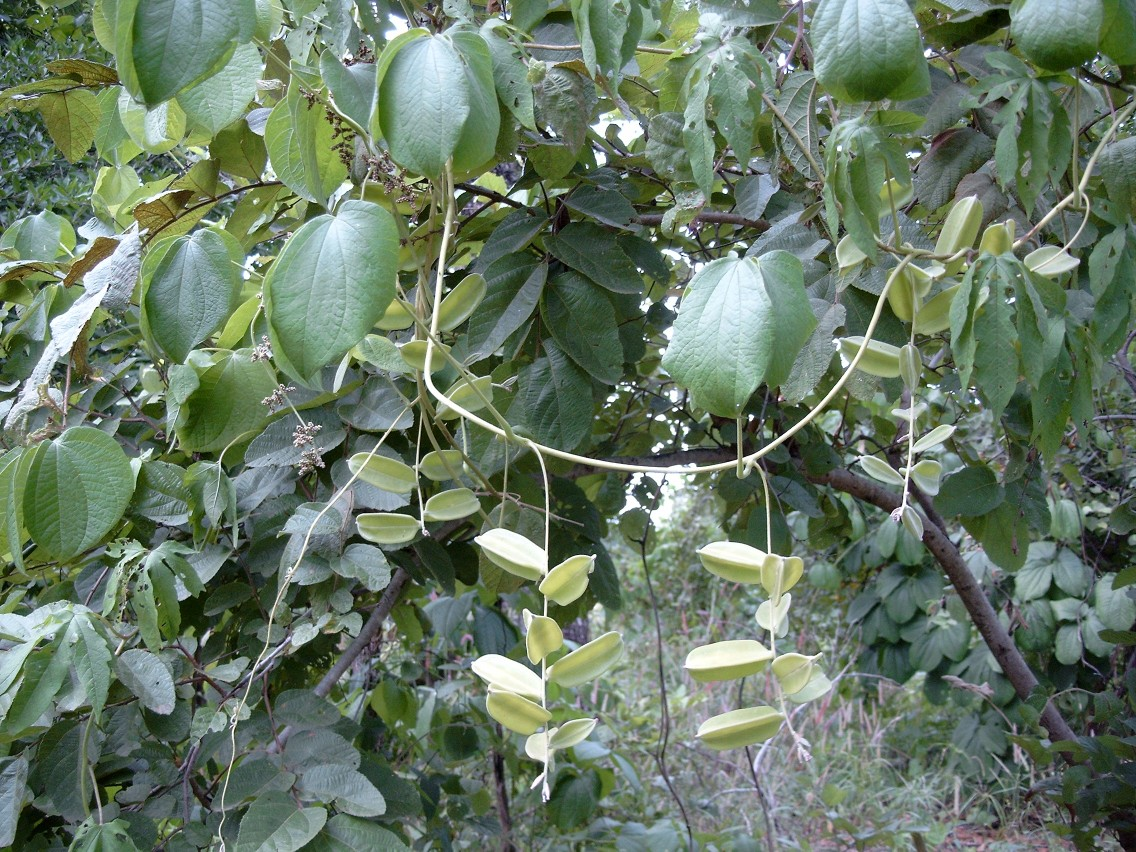
Wild bitter vines (D. dumetorum)

D. esculenta, the lesser yam, was one of the first yam species cultivated. It is native to Southeast Asia and is the third-most commonly cultivated species there, although it is cultivated very little in other parts of the world. Its vines seldom reach more than 3 m (10 ft) in length and the tubers are fairly small in most varieties.

The tubers are eaten baked, boiled, or fried much like potatoes. Because of the small size of the tubers, mechanical cultivation is possible, which along with its easy preparation and good flavor, could help the lesser yam to become more popular in the future.

==== D. dumetorum ====
D. dumetorum, the bitter yam, is popular as a vegetable in parts of West Africa, in part because their cultivation requires less labor than other yams. The wild forms are very toxic and are sometimes used to poison animals when mixed with bait. It is said that they have also been used for criminal purposes.

==== D. trifida ====
D. trifida, the cush-cush yam, is native to the Guyana region of South America and is the most important cultivated New World yam. Since they originated in tropical rainforest conditions, their growth cycle is less related to seasonal changes than other yams. Because of their relative ease of cultivation and their good flavor, they are considered to have a great potential for increased production.

=== Wild taxa ===
==== D. hirtiflora subsp. pedicellata ====
D. hirtiflora subsp. pedicellata, lusala, busala or lwidi, is native to Tropical Africa. It is widely harvested and eaten in Southern Zambia where it grows in open forest areas. In Southern Zambia, it is an important addition to the March–September diets of almost all, and income of over half of rural households. Research on propagation of this subspecies to alleviate the threat from wild harvest has been successful.

==== D. japonica ====
D. japonica – known as East Asian mountain yam, yamaimo, or Japanese mountain yam – is a type of yam (Dioscorea) native to Japan. Its other common names include cham ma, Chinese yam, dang ma, glutinous yam, jinenjo, pinyin, rìběn- shǔyù, shan yao, Taiwanese yam, and wild yam. Varieties include D. japonica Thunb var. pseudojaponica Yamamoto, D. japonica Thunb. var. pseudojaponica (Hayata) Yamam, D. japonica var. japonica, D. japonica var. oldhamii and D. japonica var. pilifera.

It is widely cultivated as a food crop in Japan, Korea, China and neighbouring islands. Jinenjo is a related variety of Japanese yam that is used as an ingredient in soba noodles.

=== Harvesting ===
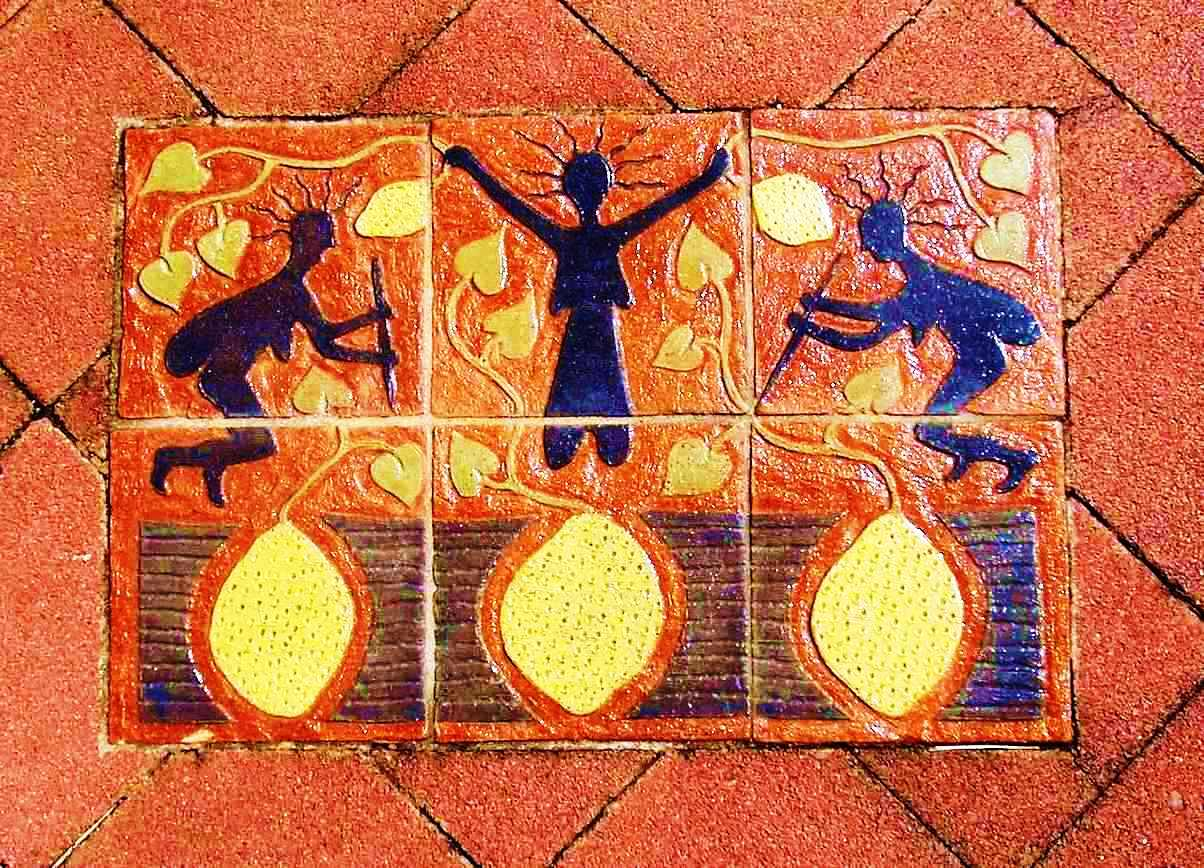
Tile on street depicting Aboriginal women gathering yams. Cooktown, Australia. 2005

Yams in West Africa are typically harvested by hand, using sticks, spades, or diggers. Wood-based tools are preferred over metal tools because they are less likely to damage the fragile tubers; however, wood tools require frequent replacement. Yam harvesting is labor-intensive and physically demanding. Tuber harvesting involves standing, bending, squatting, and sometimes sitting on the ground depending on the size of the mound, the size of the tuber, or the depth of tuber penetration. Care must be taken to avoid damage to the tuber, because damaged tubers do not store well and spoil rapidly. Some farmers use staking and mixed cropping, a practice that complicates harvesting in some cases.

In forested areas, tubers grow in areas where other tree roots are present. Harvesting the tuber then involves the additional step of freeing them from other roots. This often causes tuber damage.

Aerial tubers, or bulbils, are harvested by hand, plucked from the vine.

Yields may improve, and the cost of yam production may be lower if mechanization were to be developed and adopted. However, current crop production practices and species used pose considerable hurdles to successful mechanization of yam production, particularly for small-scale rural farmers. Extensive changes in traditional cultivation practices, such as mixed cropping, may be required. Modification of current tuber-harvesting equipment is necessary given yam tuber architecture and its distinct physical properties.

=== Production ===
Yam production in 2020
Country	Production (millions of tonnes)
Nigeria	50.1
Ghana	8.5
Ivory Coast	7.7
Benin	3.2
Togo	0.9
Cameroon	0.7
World	74.8
Source:UN Food and Agriculture Organization

In 2020, world production of yams was 75 million metric tons (74,000,000 long tons; 83,000,000 short tons), led by Nigeria with 67% of the total (table).

Yam production

Yam yield

== Toxicity ==
Unlike cassava, most varieties of edible, mature, cultivated yam do not contain toxic compounds. However, there are exceptions. Bitter compounds tend to accumulate in immature tuber tissues of white and yellow yams.

Wild forms of bitter yams (D. dumetorum) do contain some toxins, such as dihydrodioscorine, that taste bitter, hence are referred to as bitter yam. Bitter yams are not normally eaten except at times of desperation in poor countries and in times of local food scarcity. They are usually detoxified by soaking in a vessel of salt water, in cold or hot fresh water or in a stream. The bitter compounds in these yams are water-soluble alkaloids which, on ingestion, produce severe and distressing symptoms. Severe cases of alkaloid intoxication may prove fatal.

Aerial or potato yams (D. bulbifera) have antinutritional factors. In Asia, detoxification methods, involving water extraction, fermentation, and roasting of the grated tuber, are used for bitter cultivars of this yam. The bitter compounds in yams also known locally as air potato include diosbulbin and possibly saponins, such as diosgenin. In Indonesia, an extract of air potato is used in the preparation of arrow poison.

== Uses ==
=== Nutrition ===
Yam, raw
Nutritional value per 100 g (3.5 oz)
- Energy: 494 kJ (118 kcal)
- Carbohydrates: 27.9 g
- Sugars: 0.5 g
- Dietary fiber: 4.1 g
- Fat: 0.17 g
- Protein: 1.5 g
Vitamins and minerals
Vitamins	Quantity %DV^{†}
Vitamin A equiv.	1% 7 μg
Thiamine (B1)	9% 0.112 mg
Riboflavin (B2)	2% 0.032 mg
Niacin (B3)	3% 0.552 mg
Pantothenic acid (B5)	6% 0.314 mg
Vitamin B6	17% 0.293 mg
Folate (B9)	6% 23 μg
Vitamin C	19% 17.1 mg
Vitamin E	2% 0.35 mg
Vitamin K	2% 2.3 μg
Minerals	Quantity %DV^{†}
Calcium	1% 17 mg
Iron	3% 0.54 mg
Magnesium	5% 21 mg
Manganese	17% 0.397 mg
Phosphorus	4% 55 mg
Potassium	27% 816 mg
Zinc	2% 0.24 mg
- "Link to USDA Database entry". Archived from the original on 3 April 2019.
- ^{†}Percentages estimated using US recommendations for adults, except for potassium, which is estimated based on expert recommendation from the National Academies.

Raw yam has only moderate nutrient density, with appreciable content (10% or more of the Daily Value, DV) limited to potassium, vitamin B6, manganese, thiamin, dietary fiber, and vitamin C (table). But raw yam has the highest potassium levels amongst the 10 major staple foods of the world (see nutritional chart). Yam supplies 494 kilojoules (118 kilocalories) of food energy per 100 grams. Yam generally has a lower glycemic index, about 54% of glucose per 150-gram serving, compared to potato products.

The protein content and quality of roots and tubers are lower than those of other food staples, with yam and potato at around 2% on a fresh-weight basis. Yams, with cassava, provide a much greater proportion of the protein intake in Africa, ranging from 5.9% in East and South Africa to about 15.9% in humid West Africa.

As a relatively low-protein food, yam is not a good source of essential amino acids. Experts emphasize the need to supplement a yam-dominant diet with more protein-rich foods to support healthy growth in children.

Yam is an important staple food for Nigerians and other West Africans. It provides more than 200 calories per person per day to more than 150 million people in West Africa and is an important source of income. Yam is an attractive crop in poor farms with limited resources. It is rich in starch and can be prepared in many ways. It is available year-round, unlike other unreliable seasonal crops. These characteristics make yam a preferred food and a culturally important food security crop in some sub-Saharan African countries.

==== Comparison to other staple foods ====
The following table shows the nutrient content of yam and major staple foods in a raw harvested form on a dry weight basis to account for their different water contents. Raw forms, however, are inedible and indigestible. These must be sprouted or prepared and cooked for human consumption. In sprouted or cooked form, the relative nutritional and antinutritional contents of these staples are remarkably different from those in their raw form.

Nutrient content of 10 major staple foods per 100 g dry mass
Staple	Maize (corn)^{[A]}	Rice, white^{[B]}	Wheat^{[C]}	Potatoes^{[D]}	Cassava^{[E]}	Soybeans, green^{[F]}	Sweet potatoes^{[G]}	Yams^{[Y]}	Sorghum^{[H]}	Plantain^{[Z]}	RDA
Water content (%)	10	12	13	79	60	68	77	70	9	65	
Raw grams per 100 g dry mass	111	114	115	476	250	313	435	333	110	286	
Nutrient											
Energy (kJ)	1698	1736	1574	1533	1675	1922	1565	1647	1559	1460	8,368–10,460
Protein (g)	10.4	8.1	14.5	9.5	3.5	40.6	7.0	5.0	12.4	3.7	50
Fat (g)	5.3	0.8	1.8	0.4	0.7	21.6	0.2	0.6	3.6	1.1	44–77
Carbohydrates (g)	82	91	82	81	95	34	87	93	82	91	130
Fiber (g)	8.1	1.5	14.0	10.5	4.5	13.1	13.0	13.7	6.9	6.6	30
Sugar (g)	0.7	0.1	0.5	3.7	4.3	0.0	18.2	1.7	0.0	42.9	minimal
Minerals	^{[A]}	^{[B]}	^{[C]}	^{[D]}	^{[E]}	^{[F]}	^{[G]}	^{[Y]}	^{[H]}	^{[Z]}	RDA
Calcium (mg)	8	32	33	57	40	616	130	57	31	9	1,000
Iron (mg)	3.01	0.91	3.67	3.71	0.68	11.09	2.65	1.80	4.84	1.71	8
Magnesium (mg)	141	28	145	110	53	203	109	70	0	106	400
Phosphorus (mg)	233	131	331	271	68	606	204	183	315	97	700
Potassium (mg)	319	131	417	2005	678	1938	1465	2720	385	1426	4700
Sodium (mg)	39	6	2	29	35	47	239	30	7	11	1,500
Zinc (mg)	2.46	1.24	3.05	1.38	0.85	3.09	1.30	0.80	0.00	0.40	11
Copper (mg)	0.34	0.25	0.49	0.52	0.25	0.41	0.65	0.60	-	0.23	0.9
Manganese (mg)	0.54	1.24	4.59	0.71	0.95	1.72	1.13	1.33	-	-	2.3
Selenium (μg)	17.2	17.2	81.3	1.4	1.8	4.7	2.6	2.3	0.0	4.3	55
Vitamins	^{[A]}	^{[B]}	^{[C]}	^{[D]}	^{[E]}	^{[F]}	^{[G]}	^{[Y]}	^{[H]}	^{[Z]}	RDA
Vitamin C (mg)	0.0	0.0	0.0	93.8	51.5	90.6	10.4	57.0	0.0	52.6	90
Thiamin (B1) (mg)	0.43	0.08	0.34	0.38	0.23	1.38	0.35	0.37	0.26	0.14	1.2
Riboflavin (B2) (mg)	0.22	0.06	0.14	0.14	0.13	0.56	0.26	0.10	0.15	0.14	1.3
Niacin (B3) (mg)	4.03	1.82	6.28	5.00	2.13	5.16	2.43	1.83	3.22	1.97	16
Pantothenic acid (B5) (mg)	0.47	1.15	1.09	1.43	0.28	0.47	3.48	1.03	-	0.74	5
Vitamin B6 (mg)	0.69	0.18	0.34	1.43	0.23	0.22	0.91	0.97	-	0.86	1.3
Folate Total (B9) (μg)	21	9	44	76	68	516	48	77	0	63	400
Vitamin A (IU)	238	0	10	10	33	563	4178	460	0	3220	5000
Vitamin E, α-tocopherol (mg)	0.54	0.13	1.16	0.05	0.48	0.00	1.13	1.30	0.00	0.40	15
Vitamin K1 (μg)	0.3	0.1	2.2	9.0	4.8	0.0	7.8	8.7	0.0	2.0	120
Beta-carotene (μg)	108	0	6	5	20	0	36996	277	0	1306	10500
Lutein+zeaxanthin (μg)	1506	0	253	38	0	0	0	0	0	86	6000
Fats	^{[A]}	^{[B]}	^{[C]}	^{[D]}	^{[E]}	^{[F]}	^{[G]}	^{[Y]}	^{[H]}	^{[Z]}	RDA
Saturated (g)	0.74	0.20	0.30	0.14	0.18	2.47	0.09	0.13	0.51	0.40	minimal
Monounsaturated (g)	1.39	0.24	0.23	0.00	0.20	4.00	0.00	0.03	1.09	0.09	22–55
Polyunsaturated (g)	2.40	0.20	0.72	0.19	0.13	10.00	0.04	0.27	1.51	0.20	13–19
	^{[A]}	^{[B]}	^{[C]}	^{[D]}	^{[E]}	^{[F]}	^{[G]}	^{[Y]}	^{[H]}	^{[Z]}	RDA

^{A} raw yellow dent corn
^{B} raw unenriched long-grain white rice
^{C} raw hard red winter wheat
^{D} raw potato with flesh and skin
^{E} raw cassava
^{F} raw green soybeans
^{G} raw sweet potato
^{H} raw sorghum
^{Y} raw yam
^{Z} raw plantains
^{/*} unofficial

=== Storage ===
Roots and tubers such as yam are living organisms. When stored, they continue to respire, which results in the oxidation of the starch (a polymer of glucose) contained in the cells of the tuber, which converts it into water, carbon dioxide, and heat energy. During this transformation of the starch, the dry matter of the tuber is reduced.

Amongst the major roots and tubers, properly stored yam is considered to be the least perishable. Successful storage of yams requires:

- initial selection of sound and healthy yams
- proper curing, if possible combined with fungicide treatment
- adequate ventilation to remove the heat generated by respiration of the tubers
- regular inspection during storage and removal of rotting tubers and any sprouts that develop
- protection from direct sunlight and rain

Storing yam at low temperature reduces the respiration rates. However, temperatures below 12 °C (54 °F) cause damage through chilling, causing a breakdown of internal tissues, increasing water loss and yam's susceptibility to decay. The symptoms of chilling injury are not always obvious when the tubers are still in cold storage. The injury becomes noticeable as soon as the tubers are restored to ambient temperatures.

The best temperature to store yams is between 14 and 16 °C (57 and 61 °F), with high-technology-controlled humidity and climatic conditions, after a process of curing. Most countries that grow yams as a staple food are too poor to afford high-technology storage systems.

Sprouting rapidly increases a tuber's respiration rates, and accelerates the rate at which its food value decreases.

Certain cultivars of yams store better than others. The easier to store yams are those adapted to arid climate, where they tend to stay in a dormant low-respiration stage much longer than yam breeds adapted to humid tropical lands, where they do not need dormancy. Yellow yam and cush-cush yam, by nature, have much shorter dormancy periods than water yam, white yam, or lesser yam.

Storage losses for yams are very high in Africa, with bacteria, insects, nematodes, and mammals being the most common storage pests.

=== Consumption ===
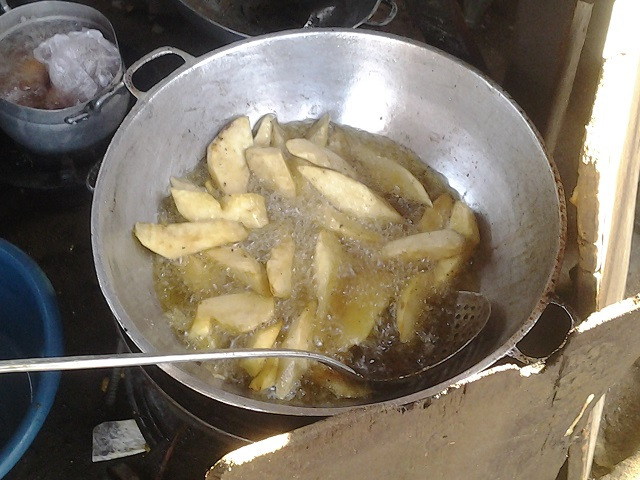
Yams being fried in Ivory Coast

Yams are consumed in a variety of preparations, such as flour or whole vegetable pieces across their range of distribution in Asia, Africa, North America, Central America, the Caribbean, South America, and Oceania.

==== Africa ====
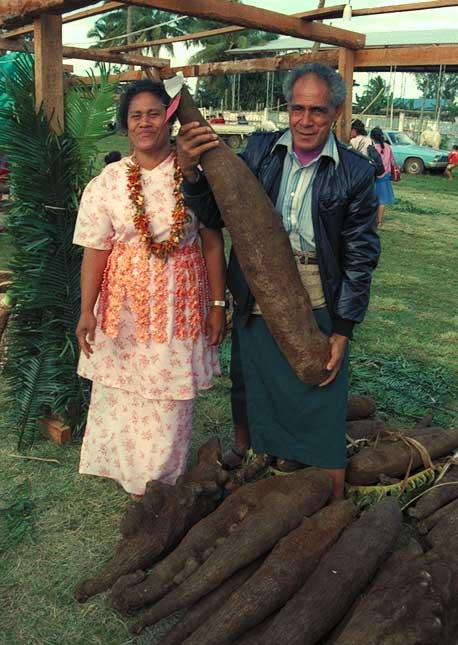
Tonga

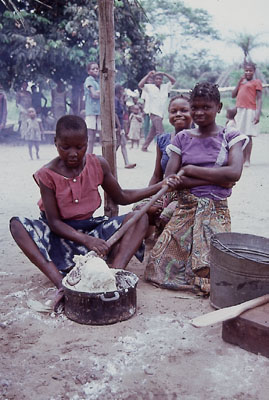
Pounding yam, DR Congo

Yams of African species must be cooked to be safely eaten, because various natural substances in yams can cause illness if consumed raw. The most common cooking methods in Western and Central Africa are by boiling, frying or roasting.

Among the Akan of Ghana, boiled yam can be mashed with palm oil into eto in a similar manner to the plantain dish matoke, and is served with eggs. The boiled yam can also be pounded with a traditional mortar and pestle to create a thick, starchy paste known as iyan (pounded yam) which is eaten with traditional sauces such as egusi and palm nut soup.

Another method of consumption is to leave the raw yam pieces to dry in the sun. When dry, the pieces turn a dark brown color. These are then milled to create a brown powder known in Nigeria as elubo. The powder can be mixed with boiling water to create a thick starchy paste, a kind of pudding known as amala, which is then eaten with local soups and sauces.

Yams are a staple agricultural commodity in West Africa with cultural significance, where over 95% of the world's yam crop is harvested. Yams are still important for survival in these regions. Some varieties of these tubers can be stored up to six months without refrigeration, which makes them a valuable resource for the yearly period of food scarcity at the beginning of the wet season. Yam cultivars are also cultivated in other humid tropical countries.

Yam is the main staple crop of the Igbos in south eastern Nigeria where for centuries it played a dominant role in both their agricultural and cultural life. It is celebrated with annual yam festivals.

==== Brazil ====
Yams are particularly consumed in the coastal area of the Northeast region, although they can be found in other parts of the country. In Pernambuco state, it is usually boiled and served cut in slices at breakfast, along with cheese spread or molasses.

==== Colombia ====
In Colombia yam production has been specifically located in the Caribbean region, where it has become a key product in the diet of the population of this area. In 2010, Colombia was among the 12 countries with the highest yam production worldwide, and ranked first in yield of tons per hectare planted. Although its main use is for food, several studies have shown its usefulness in the pharmaceutical industry and the manufacture of bioplastics. However, in Colombia, there is no evidence of the use of this product, other than food.

==== Philippines ====
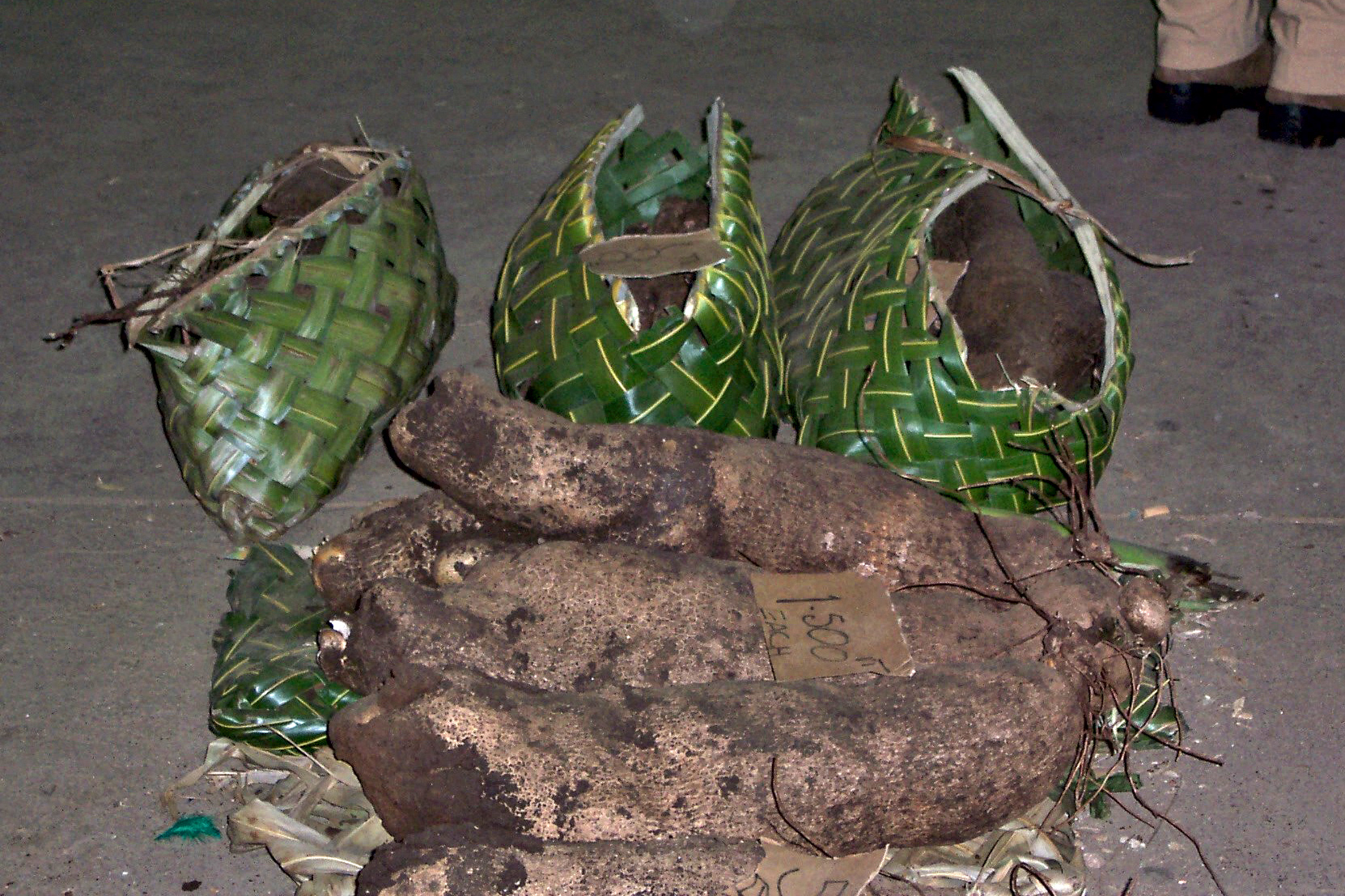
Yams at Port-Vila market (Vanuatu)

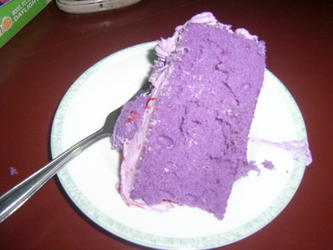
A piece of cake made with ube (purple yam; Philippines)

In the Philippines, the purple ube species of yam (D. alata), is eaten as a sweetened dessert called ube halaya, and is also used as an ingredient in another Filipino dessert, halo-halo. It is also used as a popular ingredient for ice cream.

==== Vietnam ====
In Vietnam, yams are used to prepare dishes such as canh khoai mỡ or canh khoai từ. This involves mashing the yam and cooking it until very well done. The yam root was traditionally used by peasants in Vietnam to dye cotton clothes throughout the Red River and Mekong delta regions as late as the mid-20th century, and is still used by others in the Sapa region of northern Vietnam.

==== Indonesia ====
In Indonesia, the same purple yam is used for preparing desserts. This involves mashing the yam and mixing it with coconut milk and sugar. White- and off-white-fleshed yams are cut in cubes, cooked, lightly fermented, and eaten as afternoon snacks.

=== Japan ===
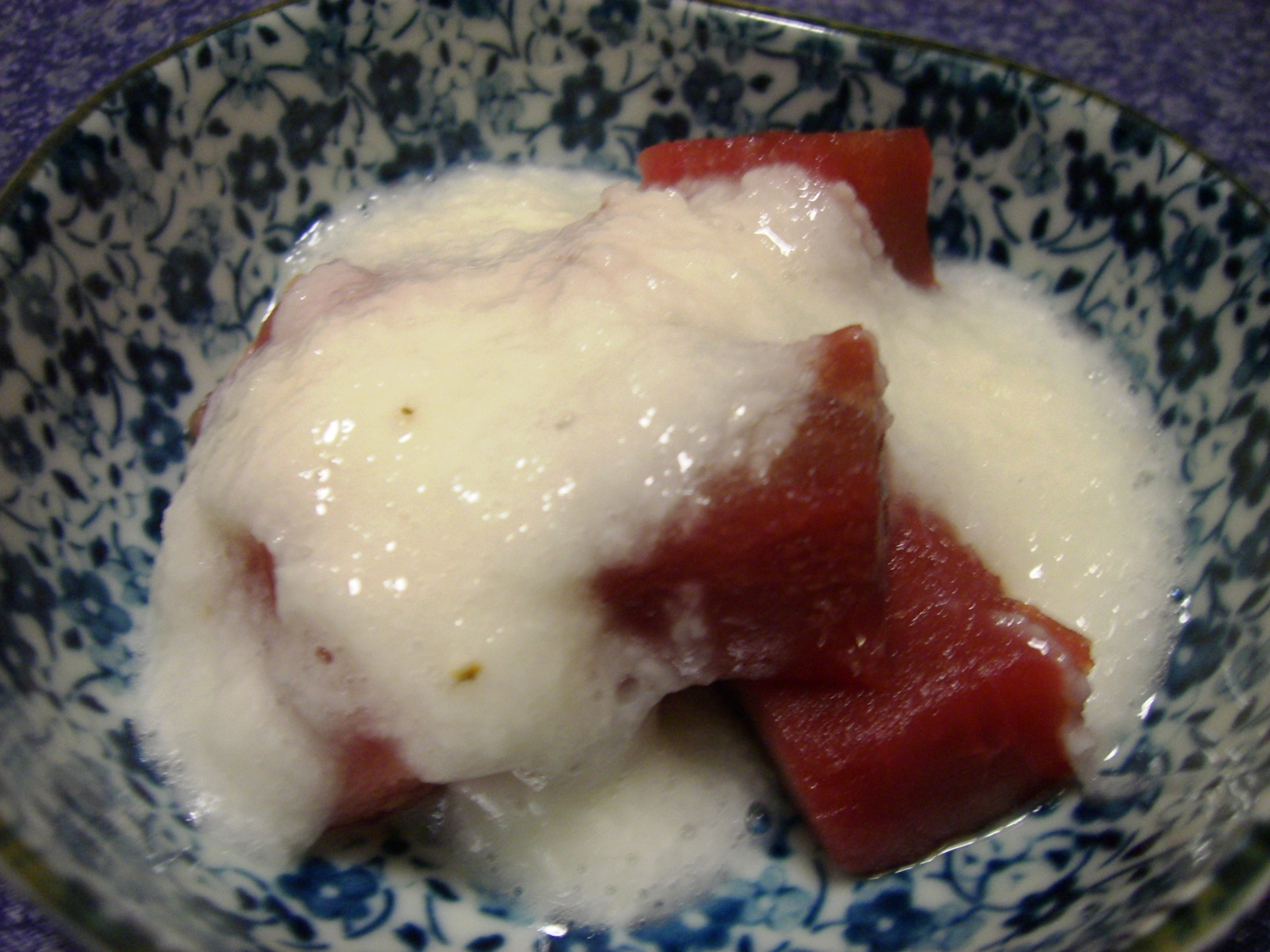
Yamakake, a Japanese dish prepared from tororo poured over maguro (tuna)

An exception to the general rule that yams must be cooked is a group of East Asian mountain yams eaten raw after grating into tororo. In Japan, these include both the introduced Chinese yam (Dioscorea polystachya), cultivated in three main morphological groups—nagaimo (lit. 'long yam'; cylindrical), ichōimo (lit. 'ginkgo-leaf yam'; flattened, palmate; kanji: 銀杏芋), and tsukuneimo (globular or fist-shaped)—and the native wild species jinenjo (自然薯, Dioscorea japonica), valued for its especially strong and stable viscosity. The market name yamatoimo (大和芋, 'Yamato yam') is ambiguous: in the Kantō region it usually denotes ichōimo, while in Kansai it more often refers to tsukuneimo, especially the Nara strain.

Preparation is minimal. Whole tubers are briefly soaked in a vinegar–water solution, which helps neutralize the skin-irritating effects of the needle-shaped calcium oxalate crystals that would otherwise cause itching during peeling and grating.Jinenjo's particularly strong, stable mucilage also makes it a traditional binder (tsunagi) in soba noodle dough. In Okinawa and the Amami Islands, a purple-fleshed water yam called daijo (also ubeimo; Dioscorea alata) is grown. Unlike nagaimo and jinenjo, it is predominantly eaten cooked rather than raw. It is steamed into the dough of karukan (かるかん), a Kagoshima confection; distilled into imo-jōchū; simmered into zōni-style New Year soup (sangon) in southern Amami; and pan-seared or deep-fried in home cooking.

==== India ====
In central parts of India, the yam is prepared by being finely sliced, seasoned with spices, and deep fried. In Southern India, the vegetable is a popular accompaniment to rice dishes and curry. The purple yam, D. alata, is also eaten in India, where it is also called the violet yam. Species may be called by the regional name "taradi", which can refer to D. belophylla, Dioscorea deltoidea, and D. bulbifera. Digging and selling taradi is a major source of income in the region of Palampur.

==== Nepal ====
Dioscorea root is traditionally eaten on Māgh Sankrānti (a midwinter festival) in Nepal.

==== Fiji Islands ====
Yam is, along with cassava and taro, a staple food, and is consumed boiled, roasted in a lovo, or steamed with fish or meat in curry sauce or coconut milk and served with rice. The cost of yam is higher due to the difficulty in farming and relatively low volume of production.

==== Jamaica ====
Because of their abundance and importance to survival, yams were highly regarded in Jamaican ceremonies and constitute part of many traditional West African ceremonies.

==== The West ====
Yam powder is available in the West from grocers specializing in African products, and may be used in a similar manner to instant mashed potato powder, although preparation is a little more difficult because of the tendency of the yam powder to form lumps. The powder is sprinkled onto a pan containing a small amount of boiling water and stirred vigorously. The resulting mixture is served with a heated sauce, such as tomato and chili, poured onto it.

Skinned and cut frozen yams may also be available from specialty grocers.

=== Phytochemicals and use in medicine ===
The tubers of certain wild yams, including a variant of 'Kokoro' yam and other species of Dioscorea, such as Dioscorea nipponica, are a source for the extraction of diosgenin, a sapogenin steroid. The extracted diosgenin is used for the commercial synthesis of cortisone, pregnenolone, progesterone, and other steroid products. Such preparations were used in early combined oral contraceptive pills. The unmodified steroid has estrogenic activity.

== In culture ==
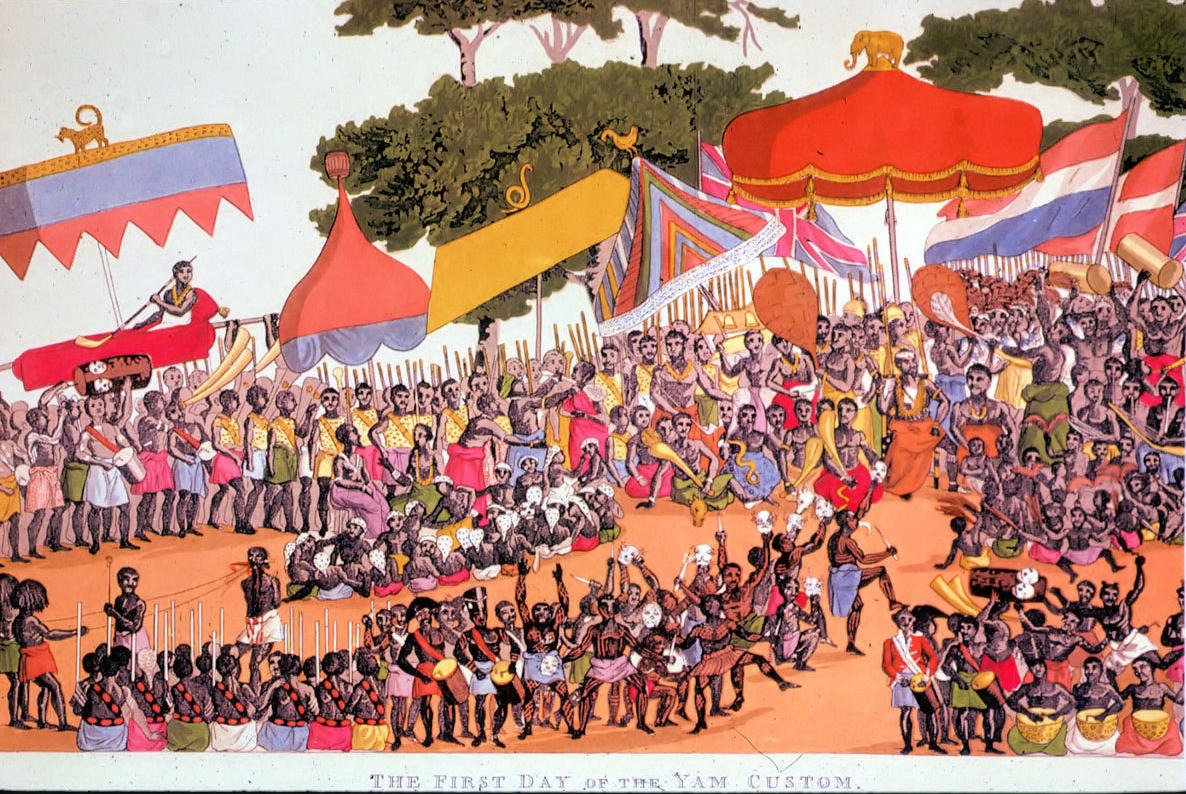
1817 painting of Ashanti yam ceremony, Ghana

Historical records in West Africa and of African yams in Europe date back to the 16th century. Yams were taken to the Americas through precolonial Portuguese and Spanish on the borders of Brazil and Guyana, followed by a dispersion through the Caribbean.

Yams are used in Papua New Guinea, where they are called kaukau. Their cultivation and harvesting is accompanied by complex rituals and taboos. The coming of the yams (one of the numerous versions from Maré) is described in Pene Nengone (Loyalty Islands of New Caledonia).

=== Nigeria and Ghana ===
A yam festival is usually held in the beginning of August at the end of the rainy season. People offer yams to gods and ancestors first, before distributing them to the villagers.

The New Yam Festival celebrates the main agricultural crop of the Igbos, Idomas, and Tivs. The New Yam Festival, known as Orureshi in Owukpa in Idoma west and Ima-Ji, Iri-Ji or Iwa Ji in Igbo land, is a celebration depicting the prominence of yam in social and cultural life.

The Igbo people accord special respect to yam to the extent that no one eats the newly harvested yam until the New Yam celebrations or feast is marked. It is called Iri ji ọhụrụ.
