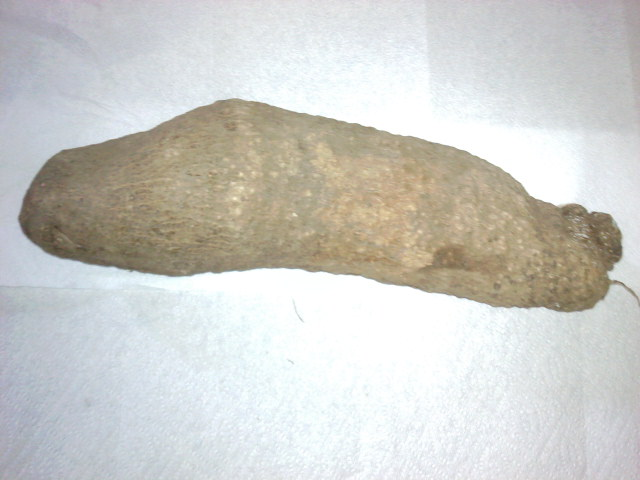
- White yam

Scientific classification
- Kingdom: Plantae
- Clade: Tracheophytes
- Clade: Angiosperms
- Clade: Monocots
- Order: Dioscoreales
- Family: Dioscoreaceae
- Genus: Dioscorea
- Species: D. cayenensis
- Subspecies: D. c. subsp. rotundata

Trinomial name
- Dioscorea cayenensis subsp. rotundata (Poir.) J.Miège

= Dioscorea cayenensis subsp. rotundata =

Species of yam

Dioscorea cayenensis subsp. rotundata, commonly known as the white yam, West African yam, Guinea yam, or white ñame, is a subspecies of yam native to Africa. It is one of the most important cultivated yams. Kokoro is one of its most important cultivars.

It is sometimes treated as separate species from Dioscorea cayenensis.

== Domestication ==
Its wild progenitor is Dioscorea praehensilis and possibly also D. abyssinica (by hybridization). Domestication occurred in West Africa, along the south-facing Atlantic coast. There is insufficient documentation and as of 2009 insufficient research to determine how long ago that occurred.

== Distribution ==
D. c. subsp. rotundata is grown in West Africa, including countries such as Ivory Coast, Ghana and Nigeria.

== Linguistics ==
Blench (2006) reconstructs the tentative Proto-Niger-Congo (i.e., the most recent common ancestor of the Niger-Congo languages) root -ku for D. rotundata.
