= Tree crop =

Tree crop refers to any crop produced by a tree including:

- Timber or lumber, wood processed into beams and planks
- Tree fruit, fruit borne on various flowering trees
- Tree nut, a tree fruit composed of an inedible hard shell and an edible seed

== See also ==
- Tree farm, a privately owned forest managed for timber production
- Tree plantation, a large-scale estate meant for farming tree products
- Crop tree release, selecting particularly desirable trees in a young stand and removing or killing other trees
- Agroforestry, system in which trees or shrubs are grown around or among crops
- Silviculture, the care of forests
- Arboriculture, the care of individual, typically ornamental, trees
