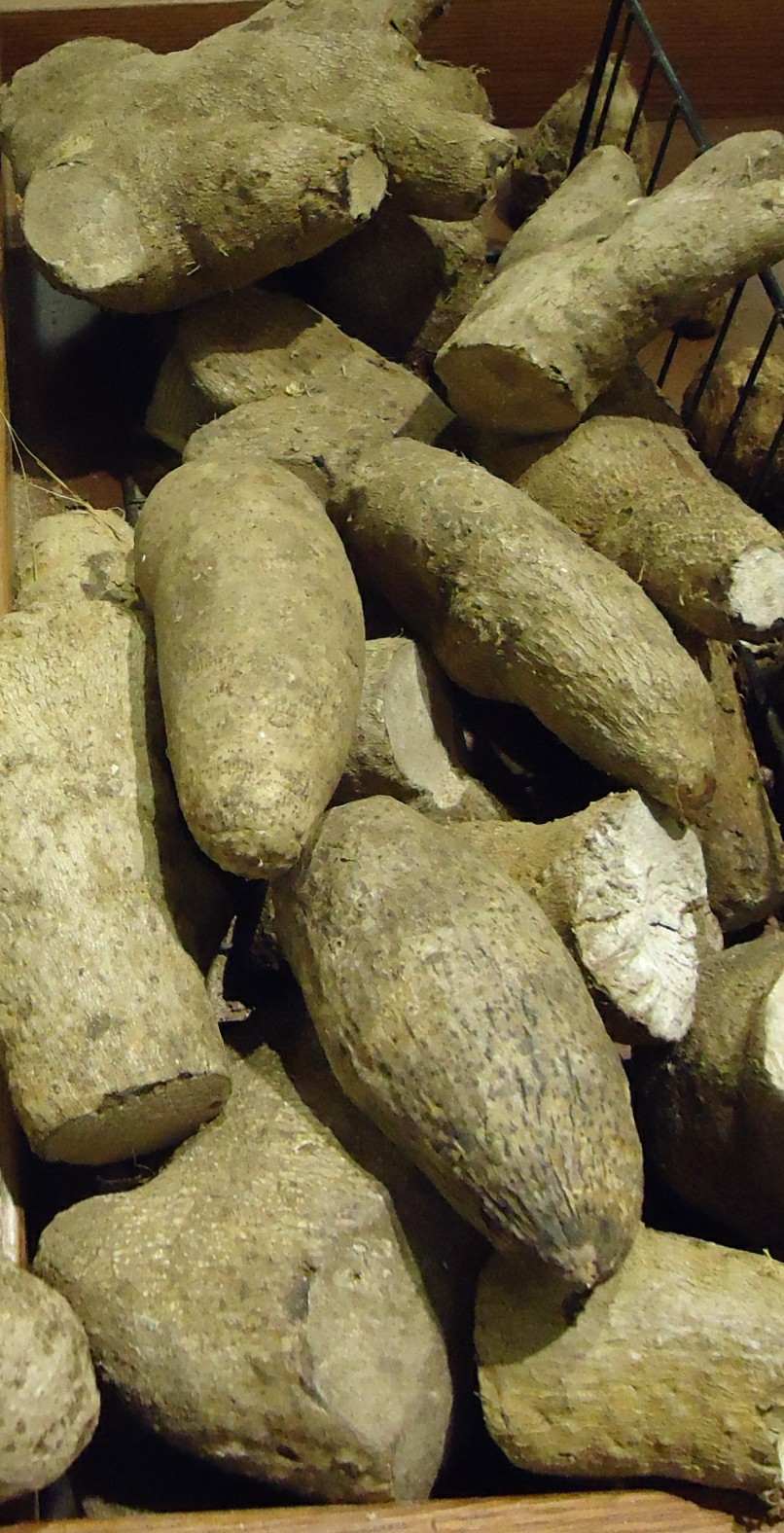

Scientific classification
- Kingdom: Plantae
- Clade: Tracheophytes
- Clade: Angiosperms
- Clade: Monocots
- Order: Dioscoreales
- Family: Dioscoreaceae
- Genus: Dioscorea
- Species: D. cayenensis

Binomial name
- Dioscorea cayenensis Lam.

= Dioscorea cayenensis =

Species of yam

Dioscorea cayenensis is a species of plant in the yam family Dioscoreaceae. It is native to Western Africa, where it is a widely consumed crop. Common names include Guinea yam, yellow yam, and yellow Guinea yam.

== Distribution ==
This species is native to the African countries Benin, Burkina, Cameroon, Central African Republic, Congo, Gambia, Ghana, Guinea, Guinea-Bissau, Gulf of Guinea Islands, Ivory Coast, Liberia, Mali, Niger, Nigeria, Senegal, Sierra Leone and Togo. It has been introduced to parts of South America and the Caribbean.

== Taxonomy ==
Two subspecies are recognised – D. c. subsp. rotunda and the autonym D. c. subsp. cayenensis.

It may be a triploid hybrid between the cultivated D. rotundata and the wild D. burkilliana.
