= Leftenan Adnan =

2000 film by Aziz M. Osman

- Theatrical release poster
- Directed by: Aziz M. Osman
- Written by: Aziz M. Osman
- Screenplay by: Aziz M. Osman
- Produced by: Aziz M. Osman
- Starring: Hairie Othman; Umie Aida; Faizal Hussein
- Distributed by: Ministry of Defence Malaysia; Royal Malaysian Army; Grand Brilliance; Ace Motion Pictures
- Release date: 31 August 2000 (Malaysia)
- Running time: 116 minutes
- Country: Malaysia
- Languages: Malay; English; Japanese; Mandarin
- Budget: MYR 2.5 million
- Box office: MYR 1.07 million

Leftenan Adnan (English: Lieutenant Adnan) is a 2000 Malaysian Malay-language epic biographical war drama film directed by Aziz M. Osman and co-produced by both Grand Brilliance, Paradigmfilm, and the Malaysian Army. The film chronicles the actions of Adnan bin Saidi who had been involved as a Lieutenant of the Malay Regiment fending against the invasion of the Japanese army during the Second World War. A digitally-restored version of the film was released in 2020 as part of its 20th anniversary.

== Plot ==
Adnan bin Saidi, a handsome Malay from Sungai Ramal in Kajang, Selangor who had joined the Malay Regiment of the British Colonial Forces just before the Second World War broke out in Asia. By the time the war broke out, he had been promoted to the rank of Lieutenant, and was in command of Company C, 1st Battalion, Malay Regiment after the death of the British company commander, Captain H R Rix. His exploits and bravery in combat while leading his men against the Japanese Imperial Army became legendary. The two known engagements he was involved in are:

- The Battle of Pasir Panjang, and
- The Battle of Bukit Chandu or Opium Hill.

Both battles occurred during the final phase of the Japanese Imperial Army's assault on the city of Singapore during the Battle of Singapore. He later was executed after the battle.

== Cast ==
- Hairie Othman as Lieutenant Adnan bin Saidi
- Umie Aida as Safiah, Adnan's wife
- Farid Amirul as Major Iwaichi Fujiwara
- Faizal Hussein as Private Ayob
- Rusdi Ramli as Private Malik
- Shaharuddin Thamby as Ibrahim Yaacob
- Wahid Senario as Ismail Malim Mas
- M. Osman as Pak Saidi, Adnan's father
- Sherie Merlis as Tumirah
- Rambo Chin as General Tomoyuki Yamashita
- TS Jeffry as Lai Teck
- Yank Kassim as Lim Bo Seng, Lai Teck's henchmen
- Zul Yahya as Ahmad bin Saidi
- Johan Abdullah as the Captain H R Rix
- Mejar Mohd Razak Omar as Sergeant Ngah
- Koperal Wan Shakri Wan Fe as Private Ali
- A Shepherd as The Doctor
- Williams Francis Hutchinson as Sir Smith
- Aziz M. Osman as Feast Guests

== Historical accuracy ==
There are several historical liberties that were taken on the accounts of Adnan for dramatising purposes. The first point was Adnan's famously tragic death - in the film version, his death was not shown explicitly on film and discretely panned out to the closing credits, where it was implied that he and the surviving wounded in his company were tied to trees and bayoneted to death, which would be more correct version and in keeping with similar Japanese practice elsewhere.

This contrasts to the official version as recorded by Japanese Imperial Army, which indicated that he was executed first, then hung upside down from a cherry tree. British accounts have confirmed that his corpse was found hung upside down after the surrender and this has been repeated in a number of authoritative texts on the Malayan campaign. The actual mode of execution was never officially recorded.

In the film, General Tomoyuki Yamashita commented on the lieutenant's bravery and valour before Adnan's execution possibly as a lesson for the Japanese troops and said that if there were ten more soldiers like Adnan in the British Colonial Forces in Malaya at that time, he would have needed ten more divisions to conquer Malaya. However, the official version records that the execution by the Japanese troops in anger for his stubbornness in holding his position and inflicting large casualties on Japanese troops.

The Lewis gun that being used regularly by Hairi Othman in this film is actually a mocked up model. From standard general-purpose machine gun it attached with prop made circular bullet magazine. The actual lewis gun model is the magazine are in slim, thin and disk-shaped. Not bulky and big that being used in this film, which is similar to aircraft version of the magazine.

== Release and reception ==
Leftenan Adnan was released on 31 August 2000 in conjunction with 43rd anniversary of Malaysia's independence and marketed as the "Ultimate Malay Film Epic". (Note: Original: "Sebuah Epik Filem Melayu Terunggul".)

Meor Shariman and Joe Lee, both writes for The Malay Mail dubbed the film as "the Malaysian version of Saving Private Ryan".

== Legacy ==
In 2014, Leftenan Adnan was listed as one of 6 Best Merdeka Day-themed film by film portal, Cinema Online. It also listed by Astro Awani as one of 5 patriotic films based on true stories should watched. Malaysian teen magazine, Remaja also listed this film as among patriotic films should watched.
