= Reflections at Bukit Chandu =

War museum in Singapore

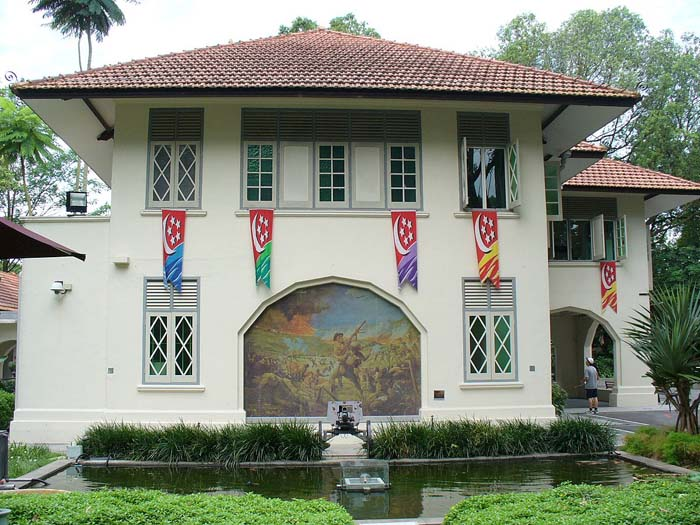
- Reflections at Bukit Chandu
- Established: 15 February 2002; 24 years ago
- Location: 31-K Pepys Road, Singapore 118458; Bukit Chandu, Singapore
- Coordinates: 1.2791°N 103.7918°E
- Website: Official website

Reflections at Bukit Chandu is a World War II interpretive centre developed and managed by the National Archives of Singapore, located on Bukit Chandu (Malay for "Opium Hill") off Pasir Panjang Road in Singapore.

The centre was officially opened by Singapore's Deputy Prime Minister Tony Tan on 15 February 2002. This date also marks the 60th anniversary of the fall of Singapore in 1942.

== Building ==
The building in which the exhibition is housed is a colonial-era black and white bungalow located near the site of the Battle of Pasir Panjang in February 1942. It was built at the turn of the 20th century for senior British officers.

The building was restored to preserve its original structure and design, retaining the original style of arches and windows but altering the roof.

== Background ==
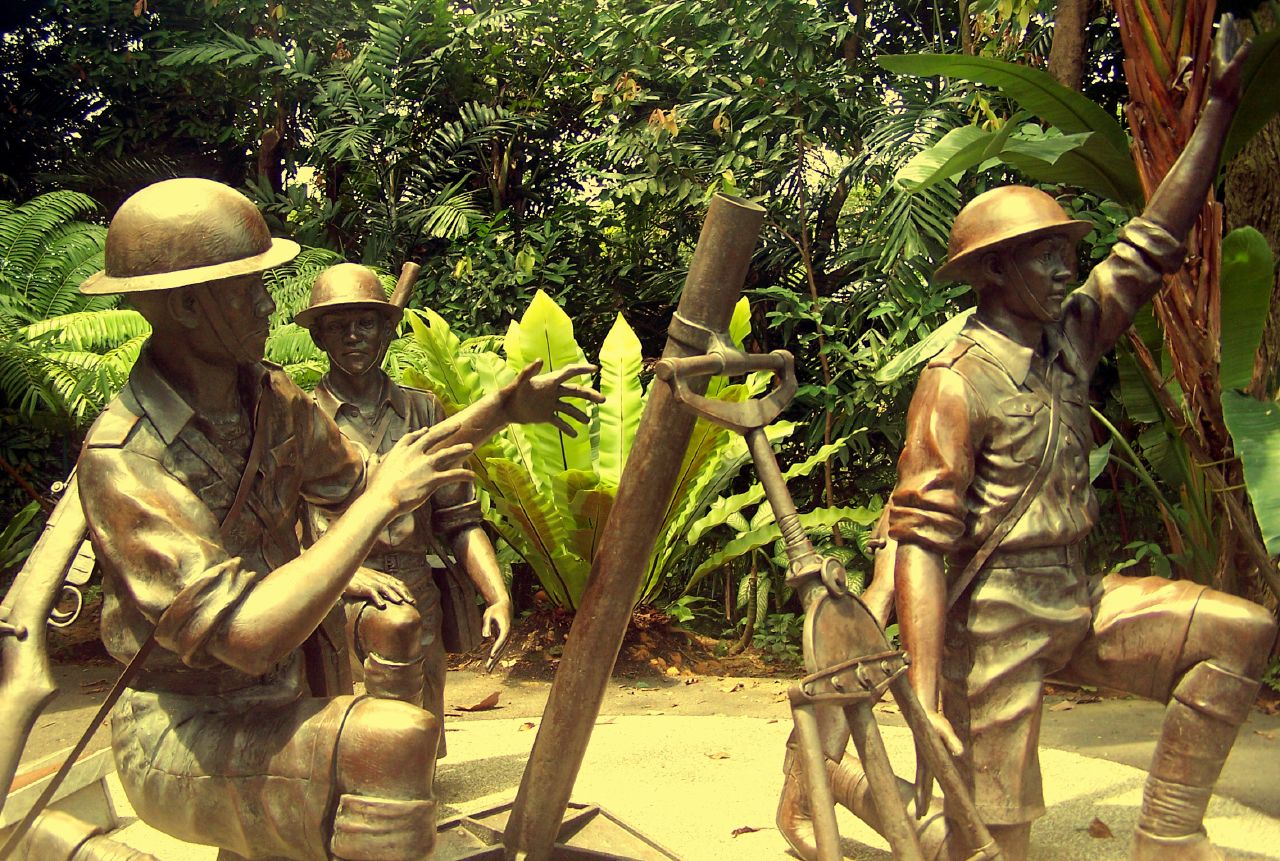
Sculpture of a Malay mortar crew displayed at Bukit Chandu

Bukit Chandu was one of the sites of the Battle of Pasir Panjang in February 1942 before the British surrendered Singapore to the Japanese on 15 February. The battle took place just two days before the surrender. The battle saw soldiers from the Malay Regiment led by British and Malay officers defending western Singapore, being forced to retreat onto the hill. For 48 hours, the Malay Regiment C Company and remnants from the 1st and 2nd Battalions engaged in one of the fiercest battles fought in Singapore. They were greatly outnumbered, and when they ran out of ammunition, they resorted to hand-to-hand combat to defend this hill. Many soldiers died on the hill. Those who survived were captured and massacred by the Japanese including 7th platoon, C Company, and 1st Battalion commander Lieutenant Adnan bin Saidi.

== Exhibition gallery ==
The museum's exhibition gallery covers the history of World War II in Malaya, detailing the late 1930s socio-political climate of the Malay Peninsula, the Japanese's plans for invasion, and the British strategy for defending Malaya and Singapore. There are exhibits of photographs, maps and artefacts. The recruitment, training, principles, and values of the Malay Regiment are represented, including through documentaries commissioned by the National Archives of Singapore, World War II paraphernalia, and witness testimony from survivors.

In 2018, the gallery was closed in 2018 for redevelopment. The gallery was reopened on 8 September 2021 in a ceremony, a virtual event, where local poet Aqmal N paid tribute to the soldiers with a poem, Tanah Sang Perwira (A Hero's Land).

The gallery features a multimedia show with pre-war footage of 2nd Lieutenant Adnan Saidi drilling his troops and an Edwin Thumboo poem.

== Nearby attractions ==
The centre is connected to Kent Ridge Park via a canopy walk at tree-top level.
