= Adnan Saidi =

Malayan soldier (1915–1942)

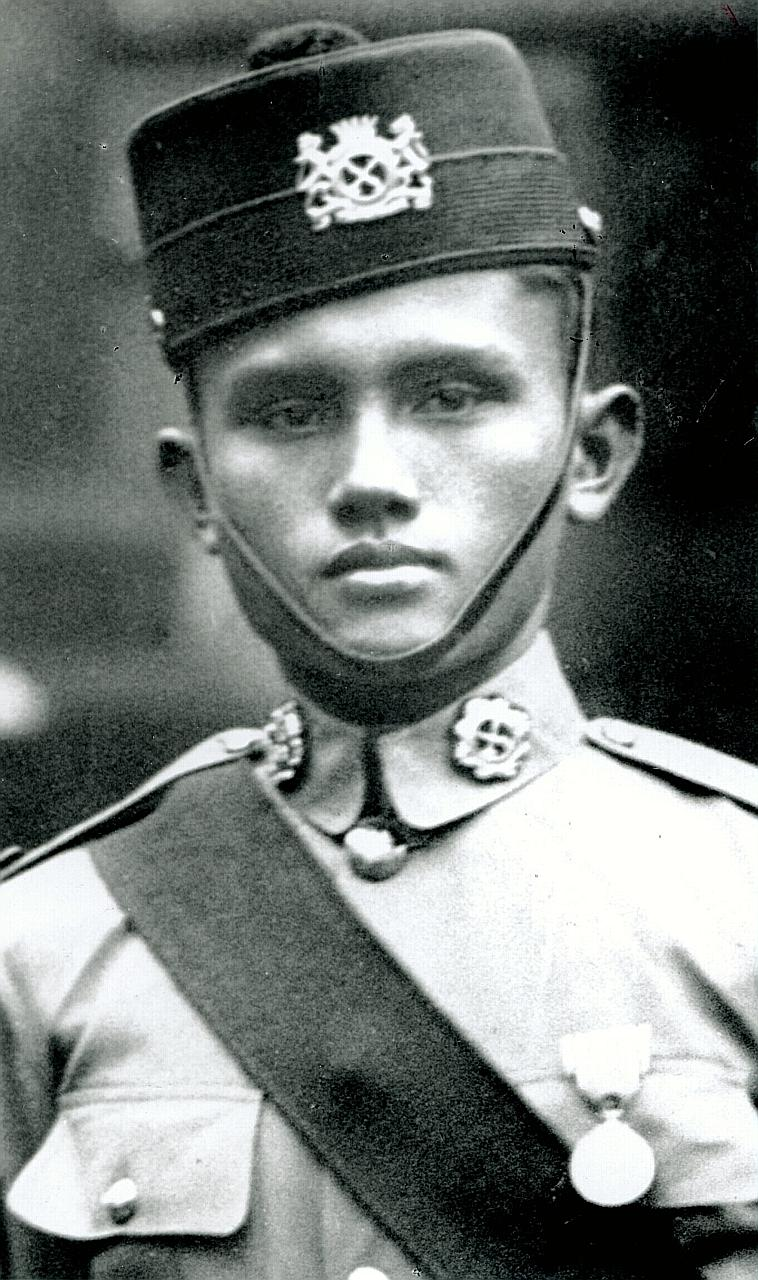
- Saidi in 1937 as a colour sergeant
- Born: 14 August 1915; Sungai Ramal, Kajang, Selangor, Federated Malay States, British Malaya
- Died: 14 February 1942 (aged 26); Pasir Panjang, Singapore, Straits Settlements
- Burial place: Kranji War Memorial, Singapore; 01°24′44″N 103°45′22″E
- Spouse: Sophia binte Pakir (m. 1938)
- Children: 3
- Military career
- Allegiance: Straits Settlements Volunteer Force; Malay Regiment; Allies of World War II
- Service years: 1933–1942
- Rank: Lieutenant
- Service number: ZV 90
- Units: 7th Platoon, C Company, 1st Battalion, 1st Malay Brigade
- Conflicts: World War II: Battle of Kampar; Battle of Pasir Panjang †
- Awards: 1939–1945 Star; Defence Medal; War Medal 1939–1945

Adnan bin Saidi (Jawi: عدنان بن سيدي; 14 August 1915 – 14 February 1942) was a Malayan military officer who served under the 1st Malaya Infantry Brigade within the Malaya Command during the Second World War. Born in Selangor, Adnan pursued his education and graduated from the Sultan Idris Training College. He was initially a schoolteacher before enlisting in the Straits Settlements Volunteer Force (SSVF), where his leadership potential quickly became apparent. Rising through the ranks, he became a commissioned officer in the Malay Regiment, one of the few Malay officers at the time to attain such a position. Known for his discipline, strategic acumen and unwavering dedication, Adnan played a vital role in the defence of Singapore during the Japanese invasion.

In February 1942, as Japanese forces launched an all-out assault on Singapore, Adnan commanded a platoon of the 1st Battalion of the Malay Regiment during the critical Battle of Pasir Panjang. Tasked with defending the approach to Alexandra Hospital and the surrounding ridges, Adnan and his men held their ground against overwhelming Japanese numbers. Despite being outgunned and outflanked, they mounted a fierce resistance over two days of intense combat. Refusing to surrender even when wounded, Adnan was eventually captured and executed by Japanese troops. His defiance and bravery have been immortalised in both Malaysia and Singapore, where he is remembered as a national hero. Monuments, educational materials and public commemorations continue to honour his sacrifice and commitment to duty in the face of insurmountable odds.

== Family background and early life ==
Adnan was born in a Minangkabau family in Sungai Ramal, near Kajang, Selangor, Malaya. He was the eldest of six children in his family and attended Pekan Sungei Ramal School. After graduating, he worked as a trainee teacher at his alma mater for over a year.

He is the great-grandson of renowned Negri warrior Datuk Siamang Gagap.

== Career ==
Adnan enlisted in the Malay Regiment in 1933 and was selected as the regiment's best recruit for his outstanding performance. He was promoted to sergeant in 1936. A year later, he marched alongside the Colonial Contingent representing the Federated Malay States at the coronation parade of George VI and earned a coronation medal.

In late 1941, Adnan was posted to Singapore to attend an officer conversion course and lived with his family in a house at Pasir Panjang reserved for the Malay Regiment's officers. After completing his training, he was commissioned as a lieutenant and appointed as company officer of the 7th Platoon in C Company of the 1st Battalion, Malay Regiment. In December 1941, he sent his family back to their hometown in Kajang, Selangor for their safety.

=== Battle of Pasir Panjang ===
In February 1942, Adnan led his 42-men platoon of the 1st Malaya Infantry Brigade to defend Singapore from attacks by the 56th Infantry Regiment of the Imperial Japanese Army. They fought at Pasir Panjang Ridge around Bukit Chandu between 12 and 14 February. Despite being heavily outnumbered, Adnan refused to surrender and urged his men to fight to the end. They held off the Japanese for two days amid heavy shelling from Japanese artillery and tanks, as well as chronic shortages of food, medical supplies and ammunition. On the last day of the battle, Adnan and his men were left with only a few grenades and had to fight the Japanese with their bayonets in brutal hand-to-hand combat. Adnan was shot but continued fighting.

During the battle, Adnan identified Japanese soldiers who were attempting to infiltrate the Malay Regiment's base in disguise as "Punjabi soldiers", who were marching four abreast (Japanese style) instead of three (British style).

=== Capture and death ===
Although it is widely agreed that Adnan was killed during the Battle of Pasir Panjang on 14 February 1942, the exact details surrounding his death differed between accounts from both sides of the war. The actual circumstances of his death were never officially recorded.

The Imperial Japanese Army's official account indicated that Adnan was executed and then hung upside down from a cherry tree after two days of stubborn resistance and refusal to surrender. Other accounts suggest that he might have been tied to the tree and repeatedly bayoneted to death. British accounts confirmed that his corpse was found hung upside down after the surrender and this has been repeated in a number of authoritative texts on the Malayan Campaign. His remains are buried at the Kranji War Memorial.

== Personal life ==
Adnan's younger brothers, Ahmad and Amarullah, also served in the armed forces. Ahmad was killed in action after his ship, HMS Pelandok, was sunk in January 1942 in a Japanese air raid en route to Australia.

Adnan married Sophia Pakih, an Islamic religious teacher, in 1938. They had a daughter who died soon after birth, and two sons: Mokhtar, who lives in Seremban, and Zainudin, who lives in Johor. Mokhtar recalled that his father "did not talk a lot", was "a strict man and believed in discipline", and was "always serious and fierce ... yet had a good heart. There seemed to be a 'light' illuminating his face." Sophia died in 1949.

== Legacy ==
Adnan is considered a war hero in Singapore due to his courageous and valiant actions at the Battle of Pasir Panjang. The promotion of Adnan as a national hero was championed by the Singaporean Malay-language newspaper Berita Harian in 1995. In 1999, Singapore Prime Minister Goh Chok Tong honoured Adnan as a national hero and his story begun appearing in history school books.

Adnan is also well recognised in Malaysia as a national hero and his story is made into a novel used in secondary schools as part of the Malay-language curriculum.

=== War memorial ===
A war memorial plaque honouring Adnan and the Malay Brigade was commissioned by Singapore Prime Minister Lee Kuan Yew in 1995 at Vigilante Drive, Kent Ridge Park, Singapore.

A colonial-era bungalow at Bukit Chandu was converted into Reflections at Bukit Chandu, an interpretative centre about the Battle of Pasir Panjang.

The Art-in-Transit programme of Pasir Panjang MRT station, titled Lieutenant Adnan, by Ho Tzu Nyen, features mock posters all around the station and lift shaft for a fictional movie about Adnan, who is portrayed by Singaporean actor Aaron Aziz.

=== Portrayal in film ===
Adnan was portrayed by Malaysian actor Hairie Othman in the 2000 film Leftenan Adnan.

He was also portrayed by an unknown Malay actor in the 2001 Singaporean television series A War Diary.

Aaron Aziz also portrayed Adnan in an episode of the 2004 historical series Life Story from Mediacorp Channel 5, which also covers his personal life.

In May 2016, a Singaporean actor Fadhlur Rahman also played as Adnan in Heroes: Battle of Bukit Chandu aired by Mediacorp Channel 5, Channel 8, Suria, Vasantham and Channel NewsAsia. In the episodes, there were interviews with Adnan's granddaughter Wan Sofia Zainuddin.

=== Singapore's bicentennial ===
On 5 June 2019, on Hari Raya Aidilfitri, Singapore President Halimah Yacob launched commemorative notes featuring Adnan along with 7 other historical Singaporean figures in a $20 commemorative notes marking Singapore's bicentennial celebrations, 1819–2019 edition.

== See also ==
- Lim Bo Seng
