= Pasir Panjang Pillbox =

World War II era defensive structure

- Part of World War II-era Defence of Singapore
- Singapore
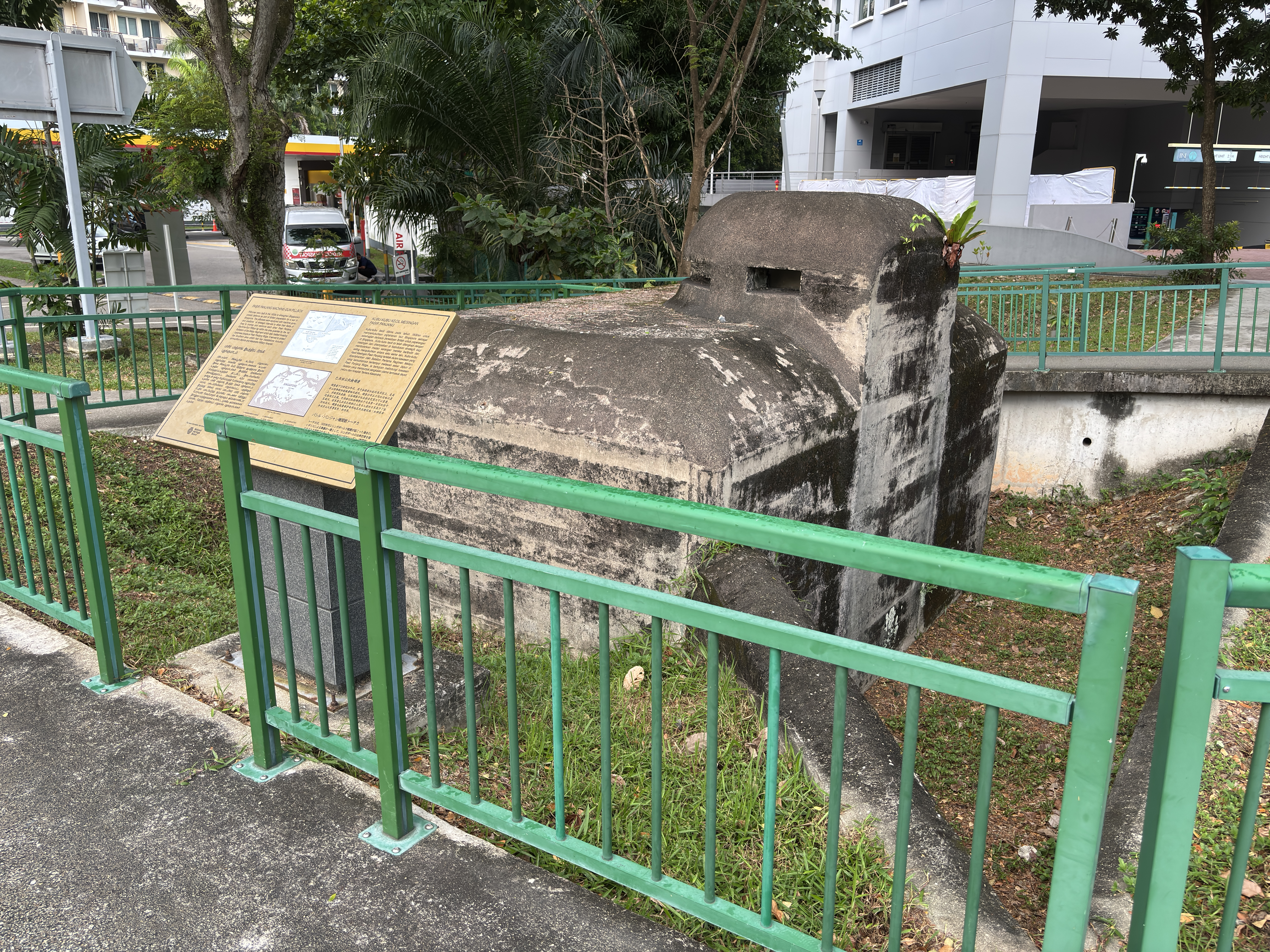
- Pasir Panjang Pillbox in 2026

Site information
- Controlled by: British military (former)
- Open to the public: Yes (externally only; access inside the pillbox is not allowed)
- Condition: Good

Location
- Coordinates: 1.289°N 103.778167°E

Site history
- Built: pre-WWII
- Built by: British military
- Materials: Concrete (reinforced) and steel
- Battles/wars: Battle of Pasir Panjang
- Events: Second World War

Garrison information
- Current commander: None
- Past commanders: Unknown
- Garrison: occupied by British military forces in Singapore (former)
- Occupants: British military (former)

Pasir Panjang Pillbox is a strengthened-concrete defensive structure from World War II, located in Pasir Panjang in the southwestern area of Singapore.

== Background and history ==
In advance of the Japanese invasion of Malaya and Singapore between 1941 and 1942 during World War II, a number of concrete-built defensive pillboxes were built along Singapore's eastern and western coasts. The Pillbox laid within the area guarded by the 1st Battalion of the Malay Regiment which later on engaged with invading Japanese troops at Pasir Pajang Ridge. It served to protect the Southern area which had key installations such as ammunition depots and Alexandra Military Hospital. Behind the pillbox is an angled defensive-wall offering protection to those defending the rear of the structure.

== Gallery ==
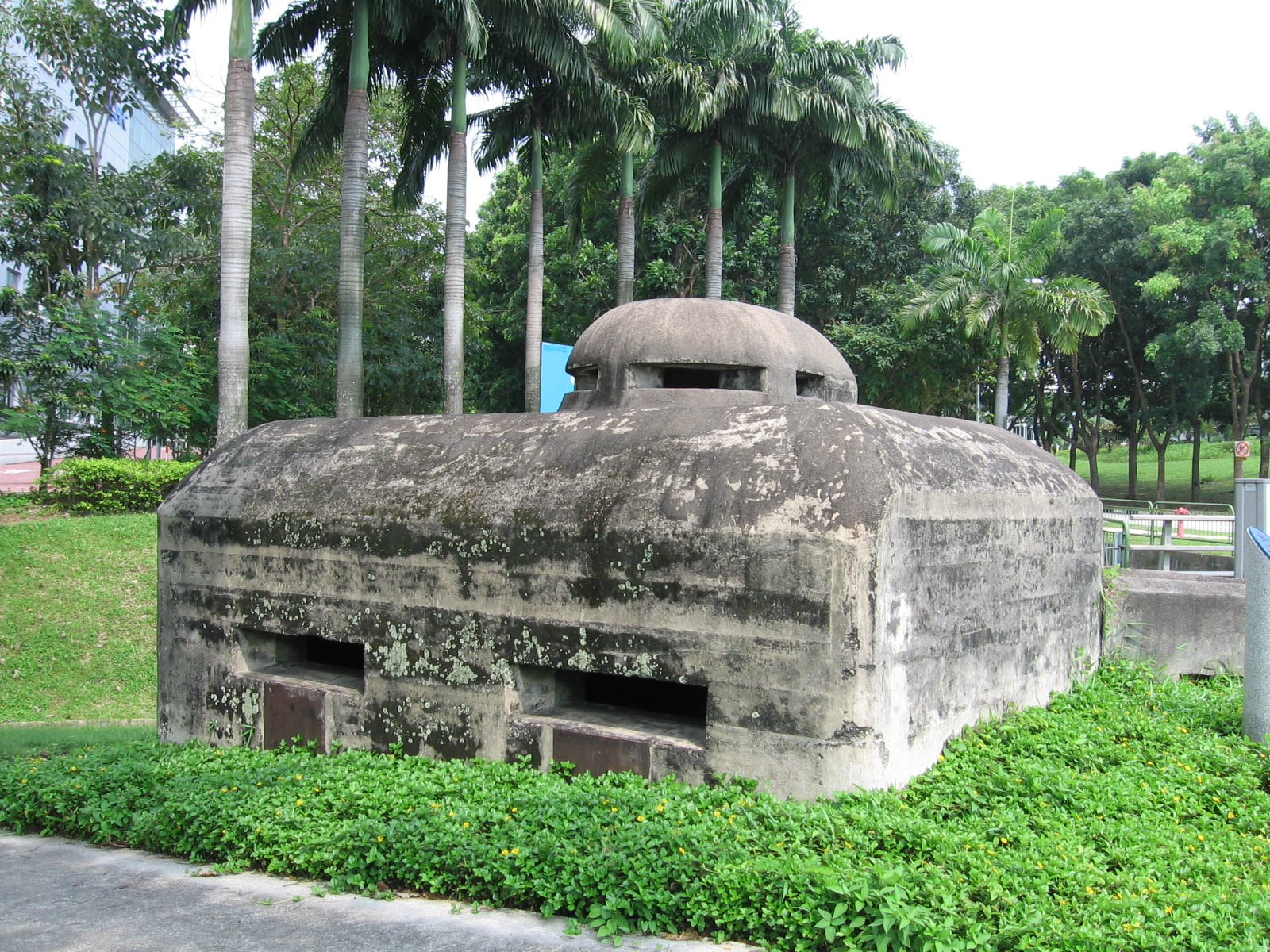
The Pasir Panjang Machine Gun Pillbox.

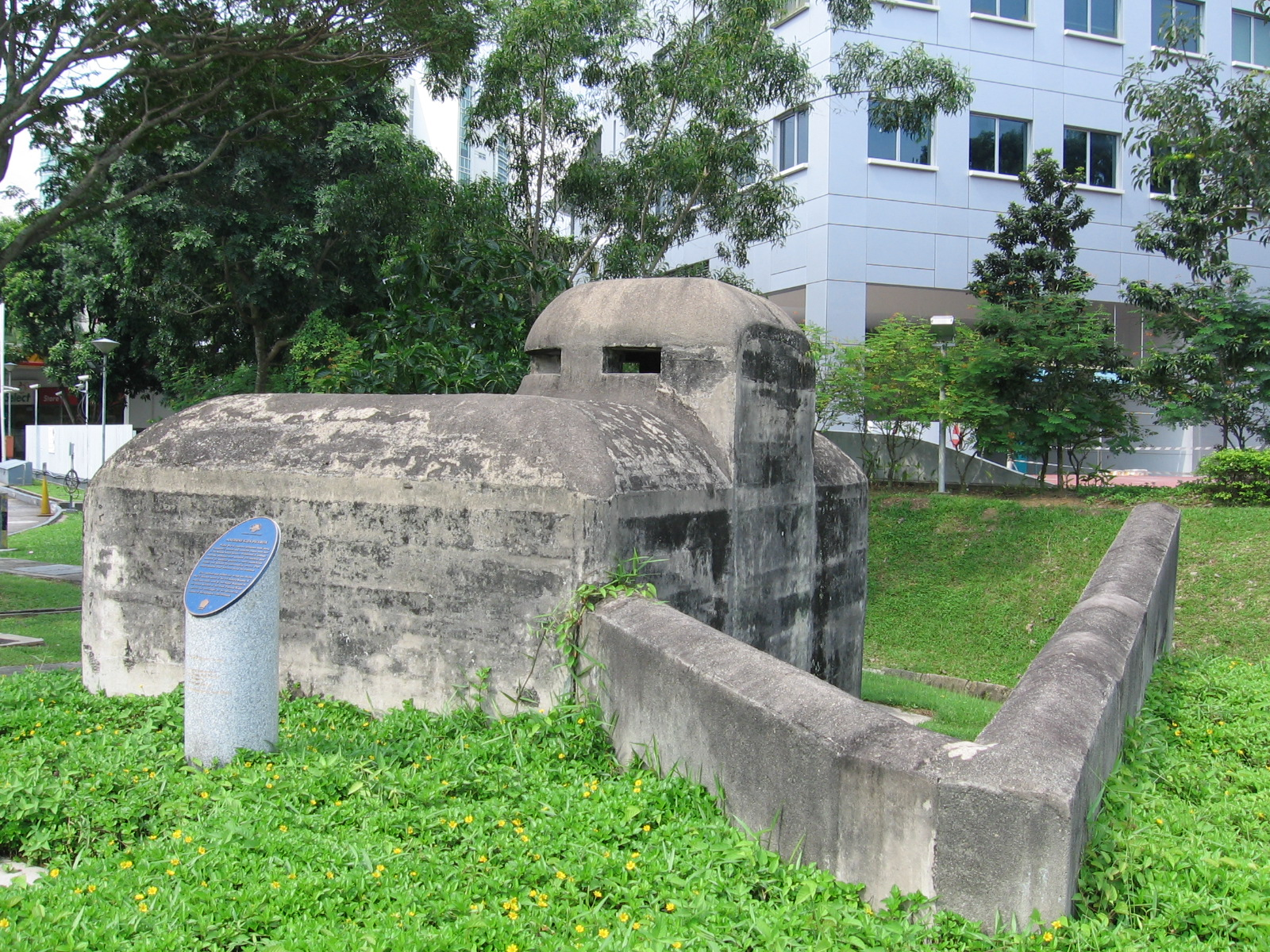
An angled defensive-wall behind the pillbox offers protection to those defending the rear of the structure (albeit having little to no protection over their heads without a roof).

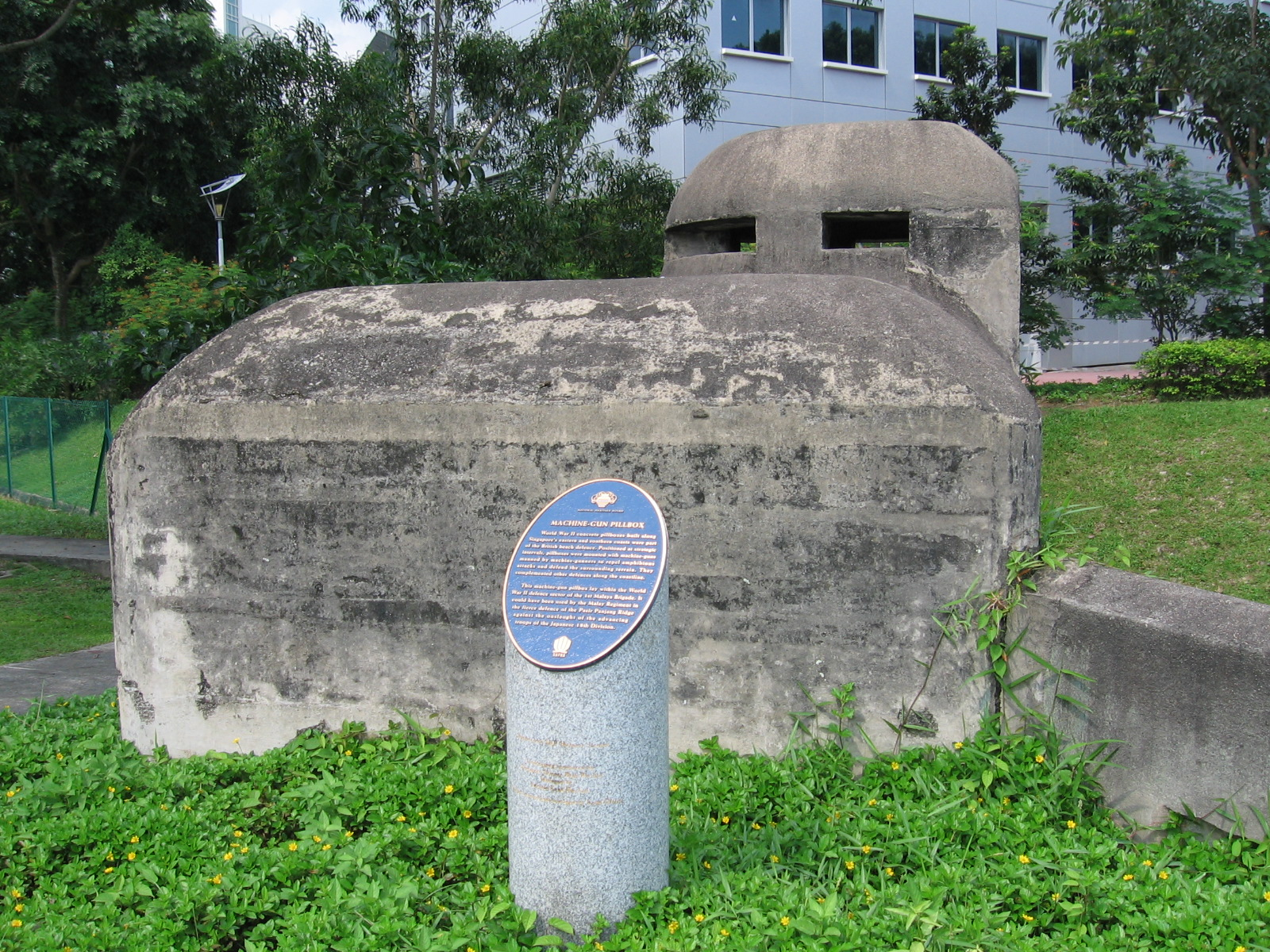
A memorial plaque established by Singapore's National Heritage Board (NHB) in front of the pillbox commemorating the history of the structure.

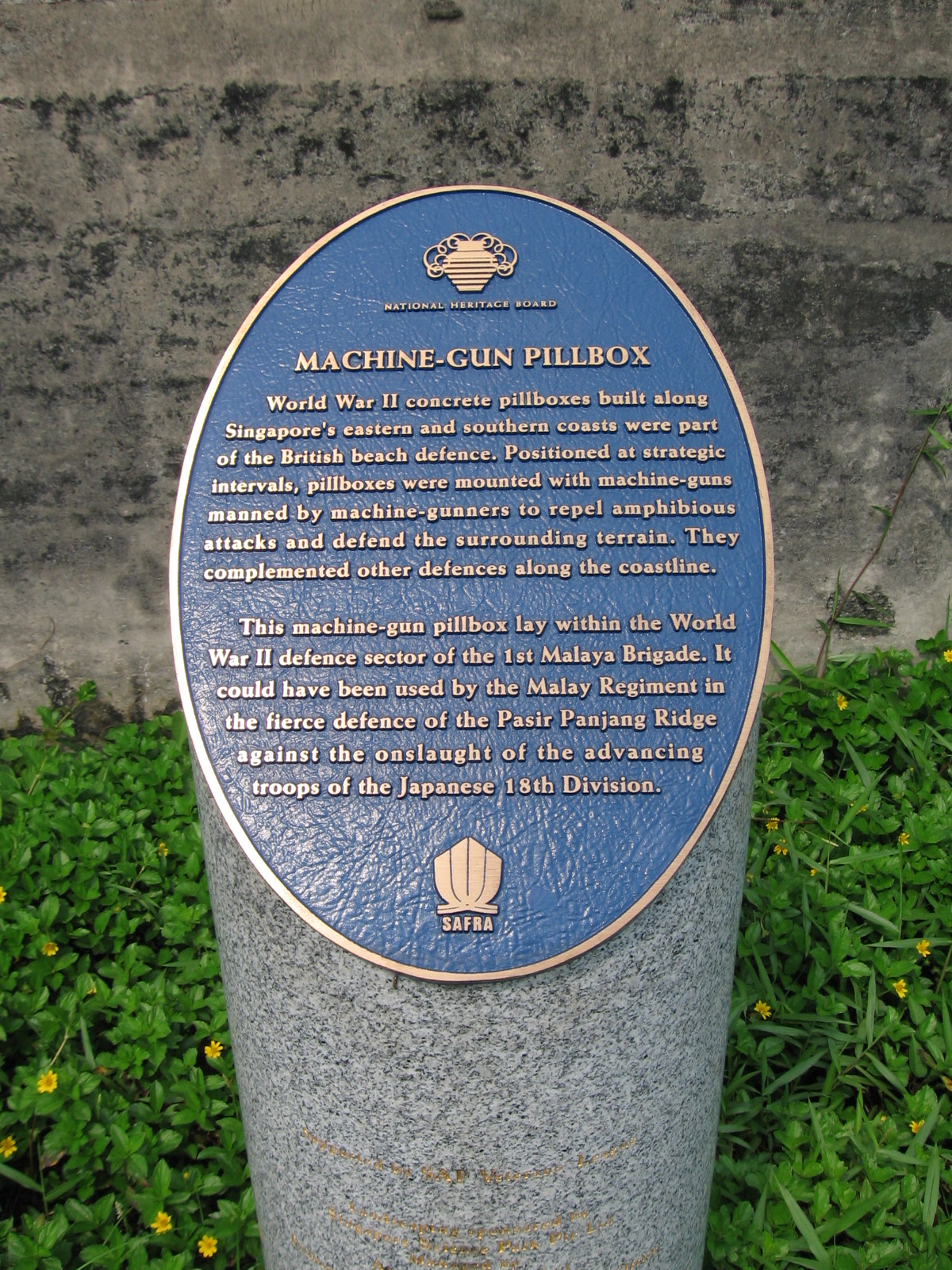
The memorial plaque's content in 2006

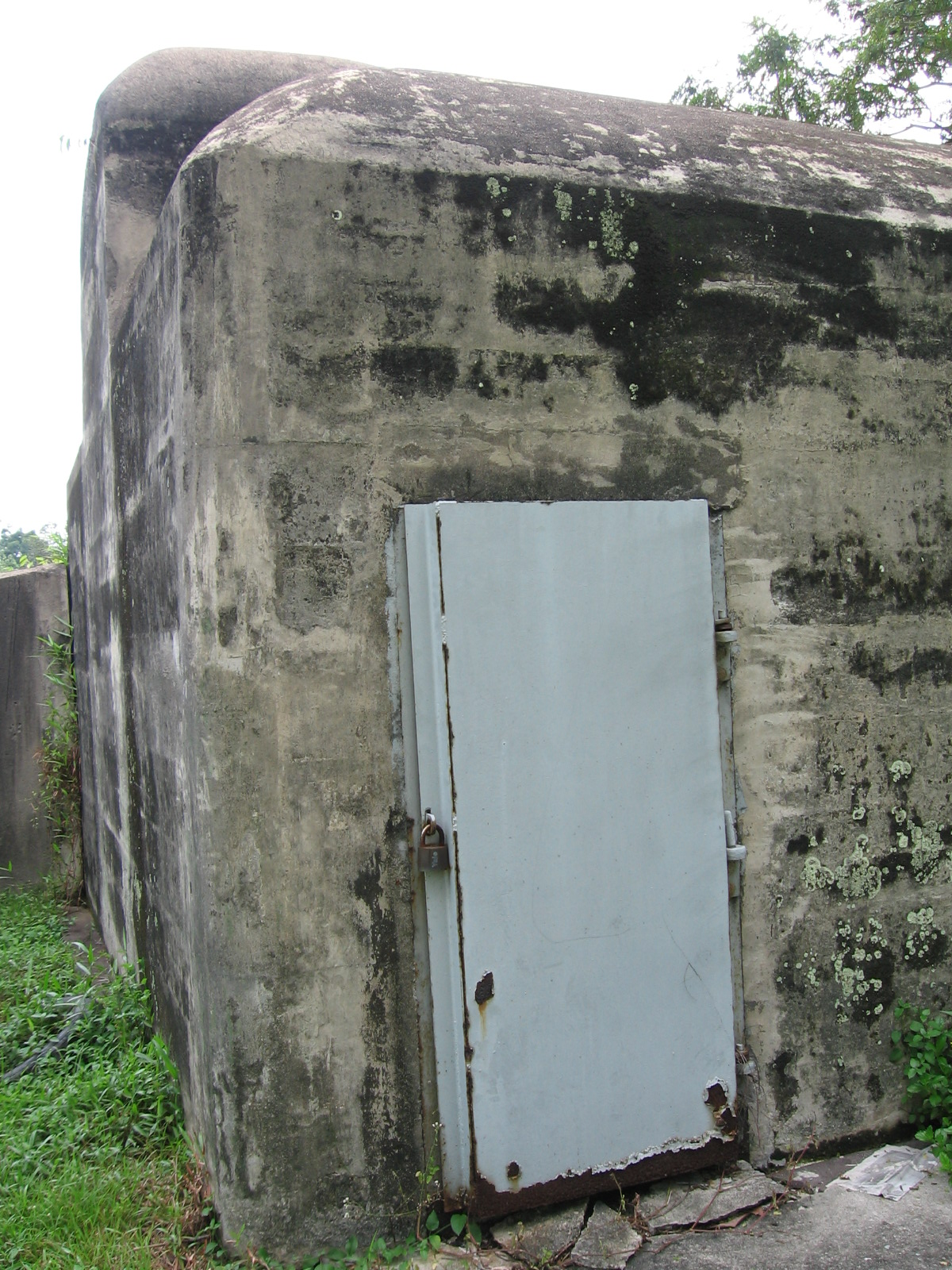
The entrance-door into the pillbox, now having been sealed up and access inside prohibited.

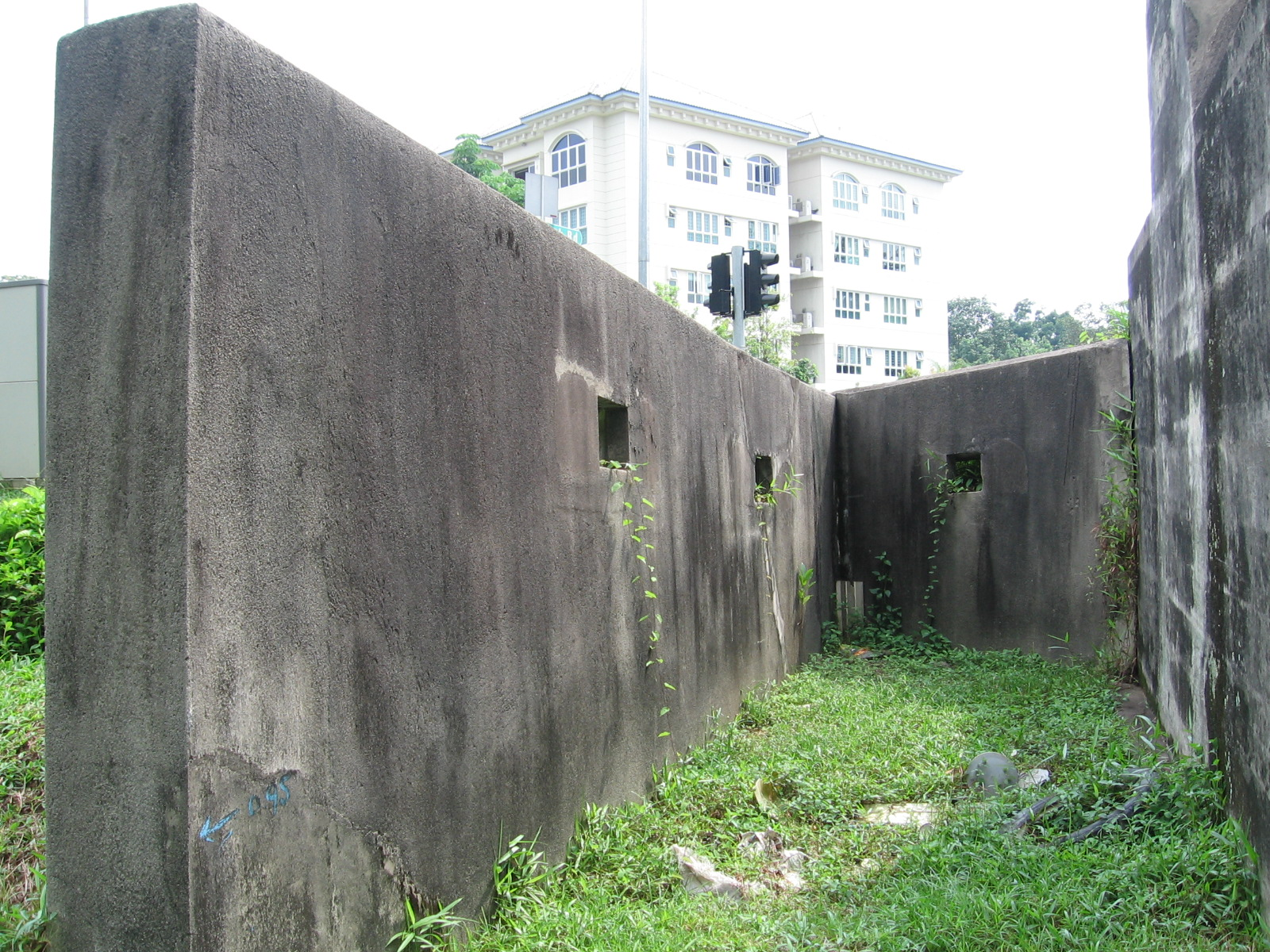
The rear-area of the pillbox, with square holes placed in the defensive-wall provided to allow troops to fire on approaching enemy soldiers getting too close to entering the structure.

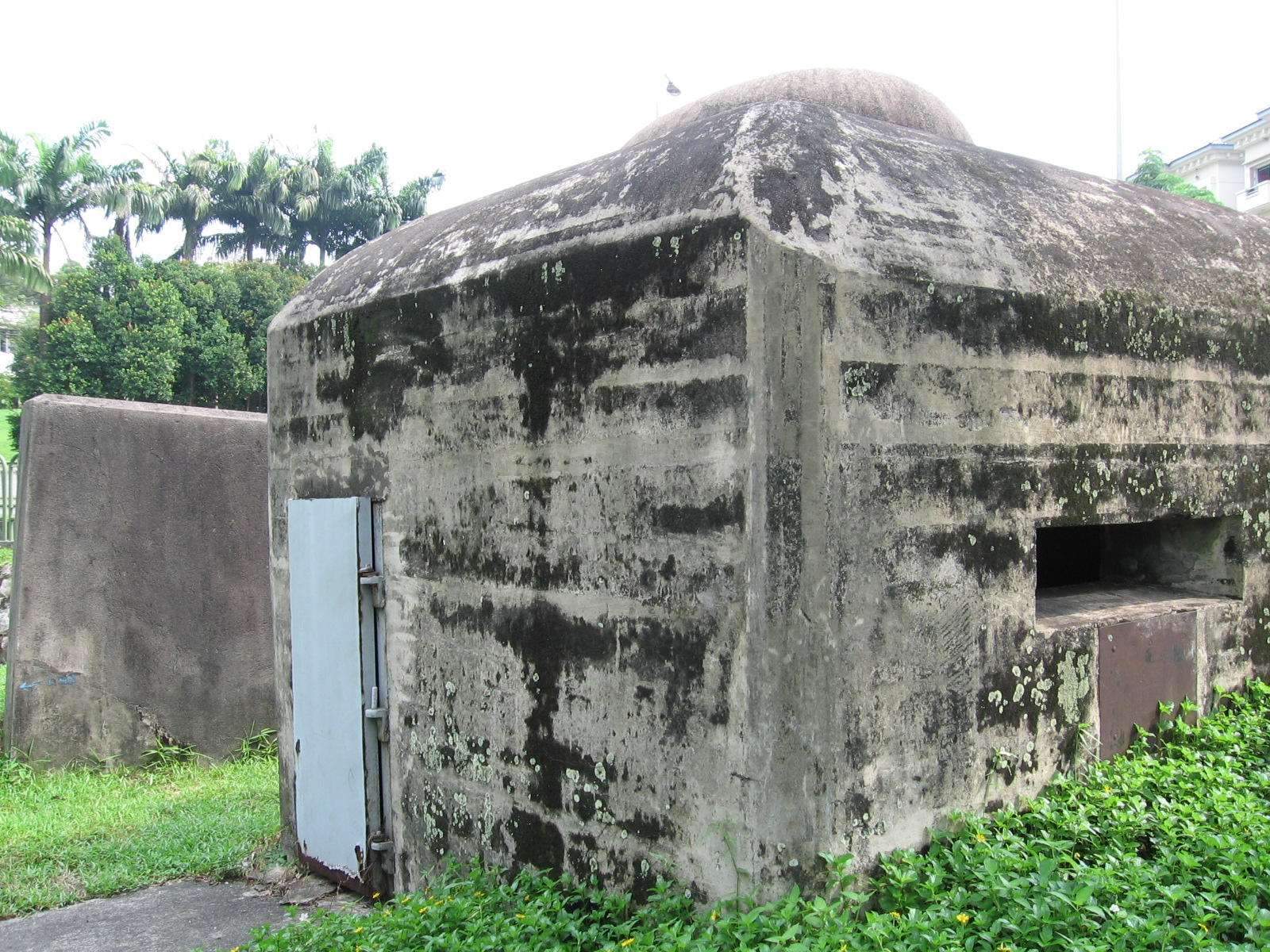
The entrance-door shown here together with one of the pillbox's gun embrasures.

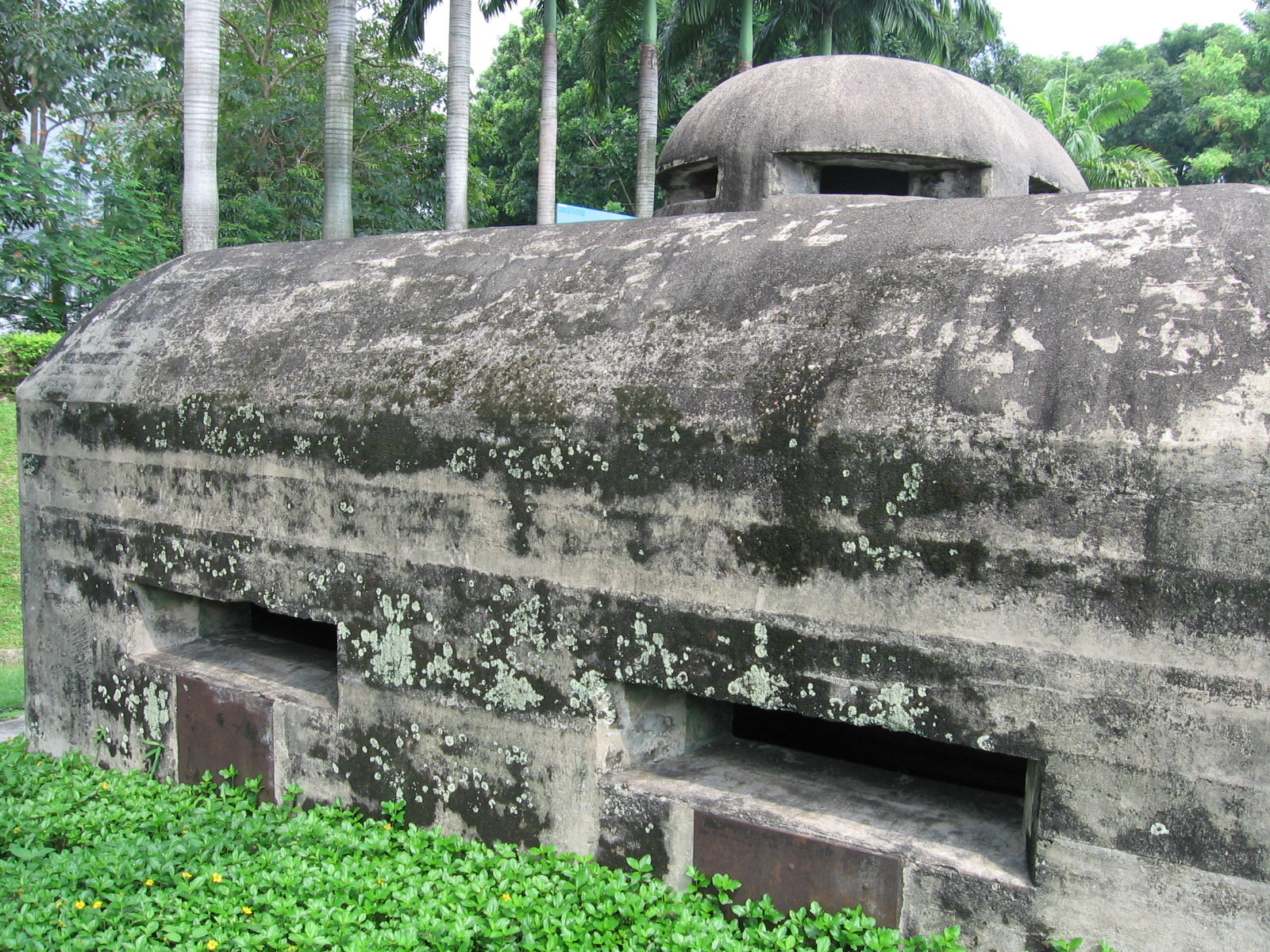
Two gun embrasures shown together with the rounded observation cupola on the roof of the pillbox.

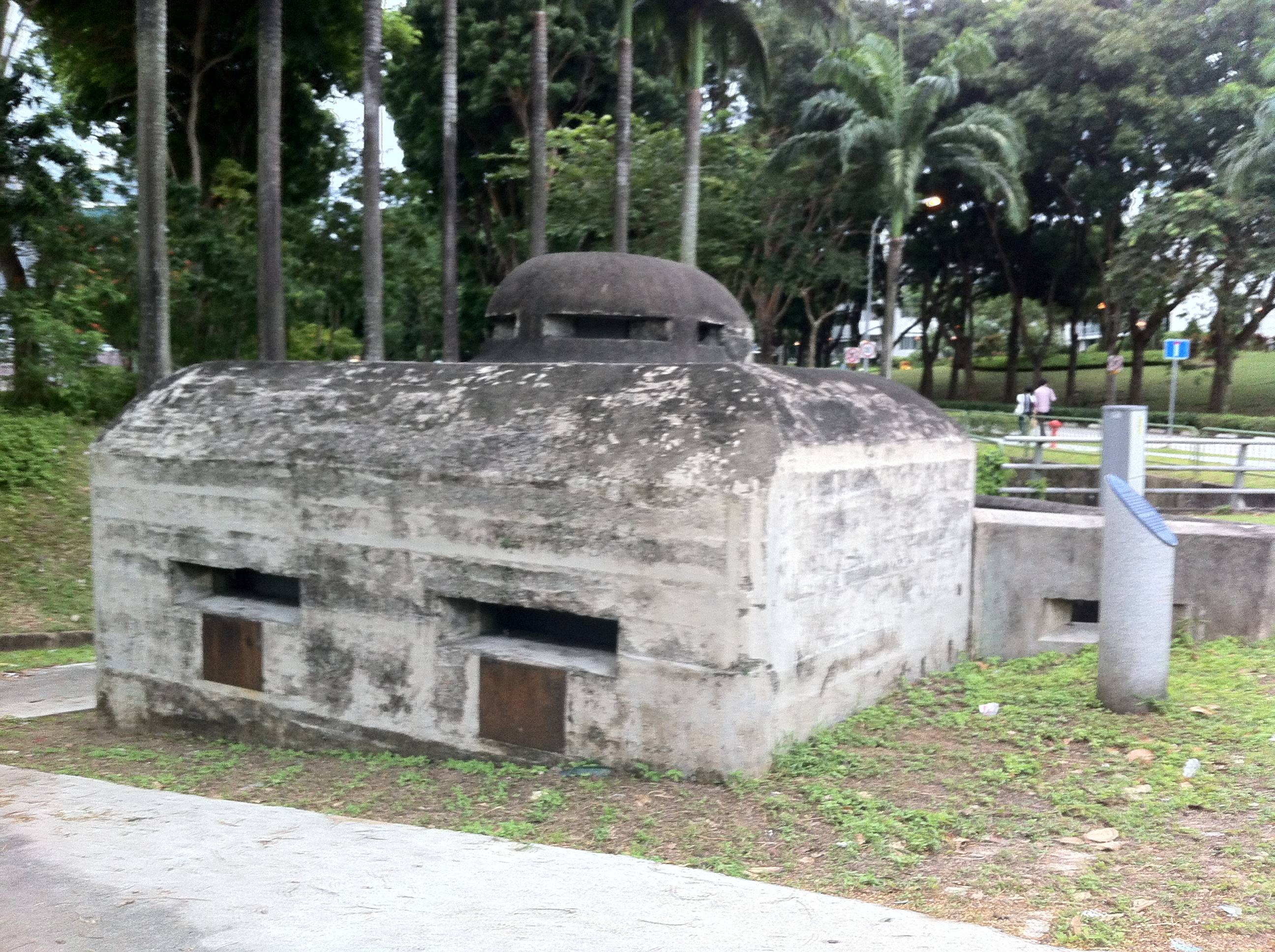
A wide-angle view of the Pasir Panjang Pillbox.

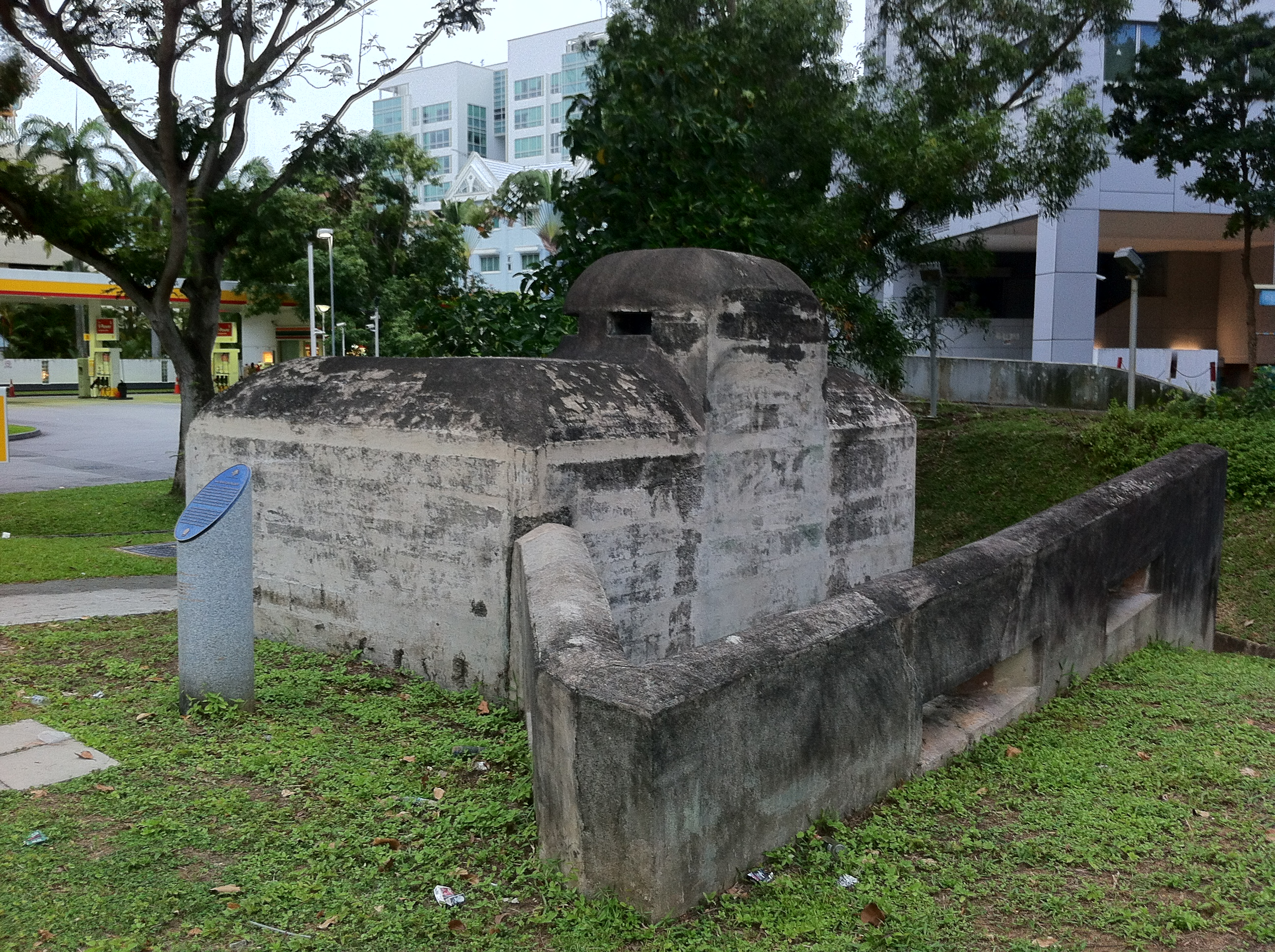
Another wide-angle view of the historic structure.

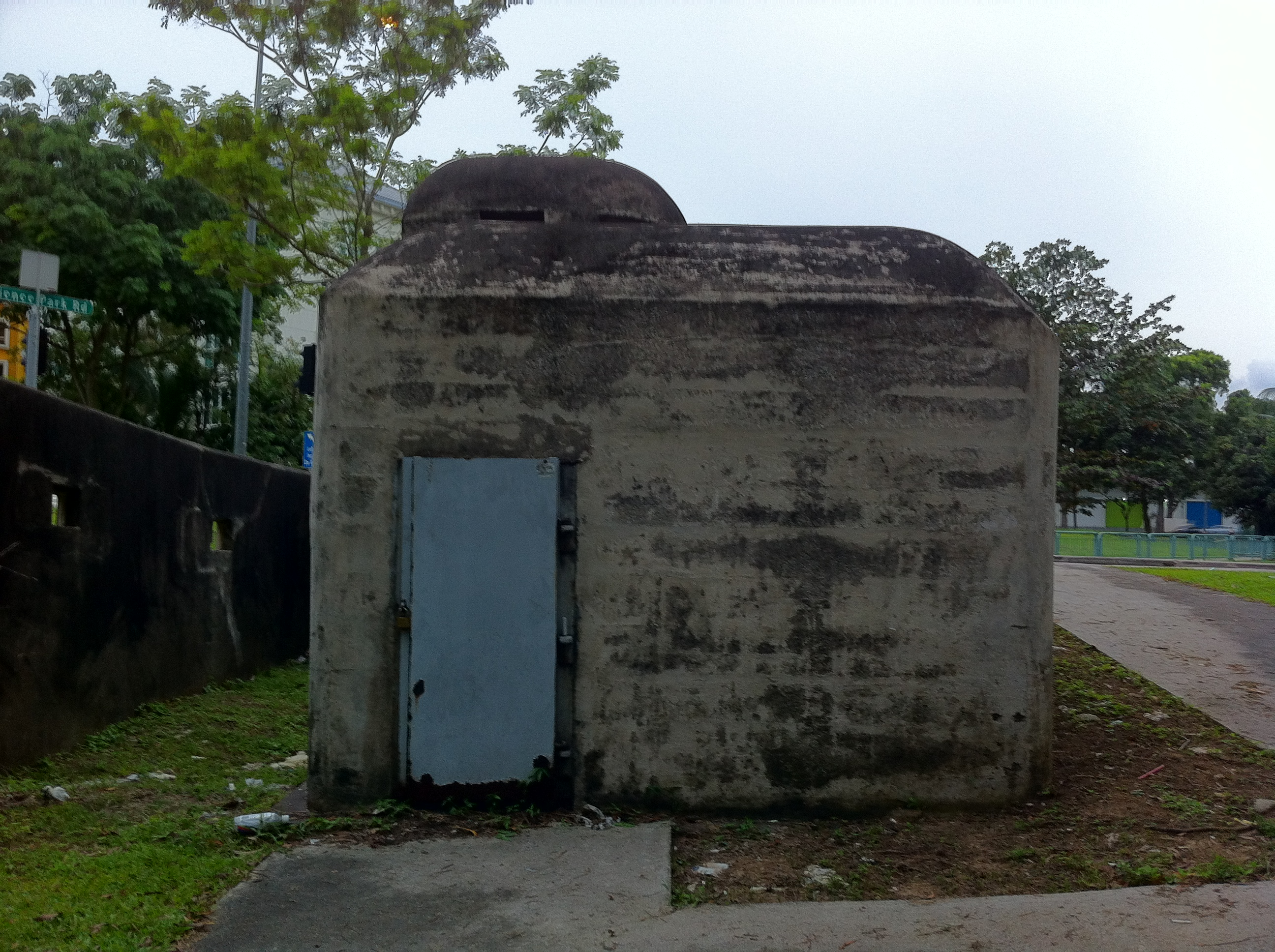
The entrance-door of the pillbox with the top of the observation cupola also seen.

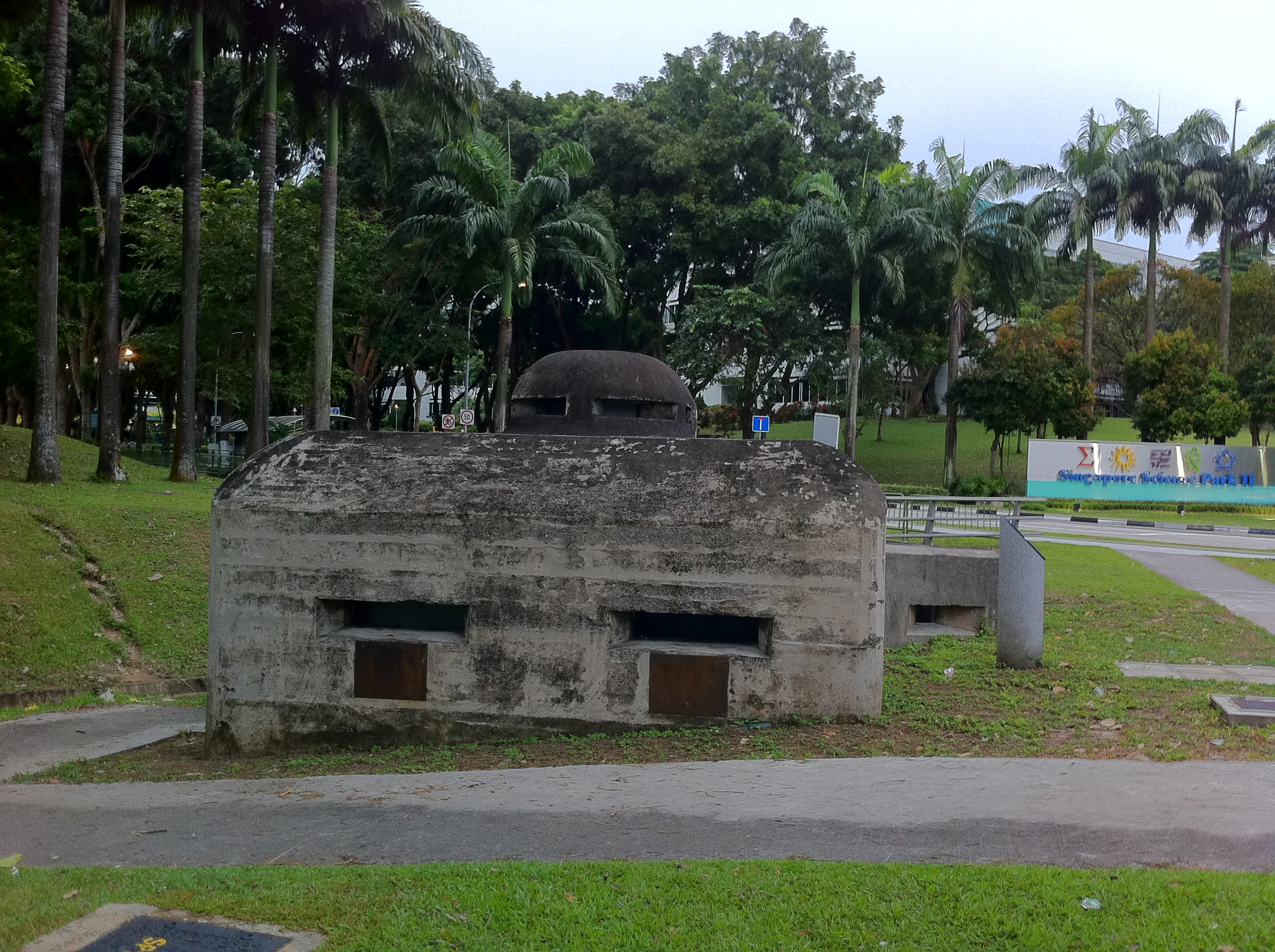
The front of the pillbox towards which an enemy force would face.

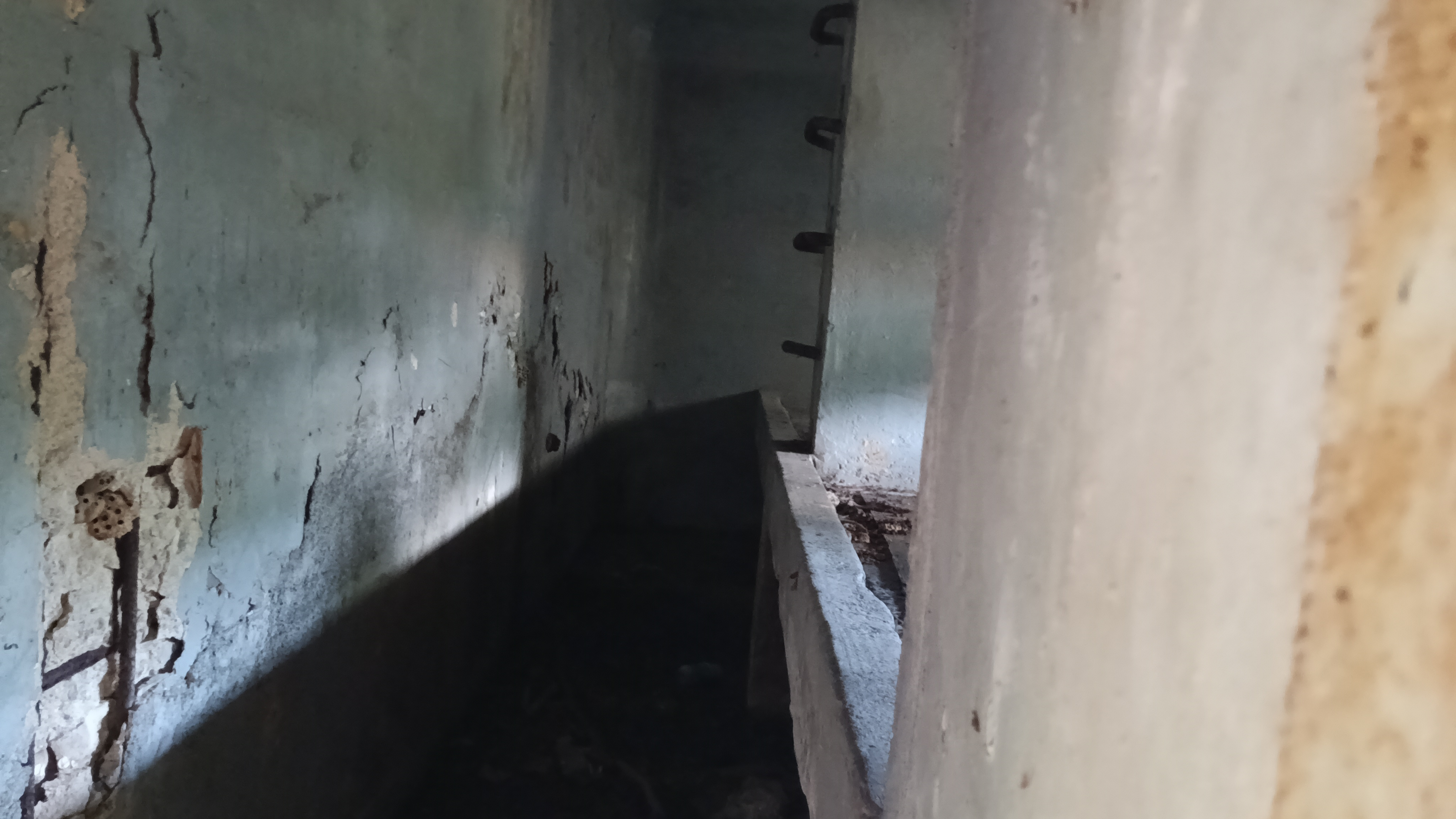
A look at the interior of the pillbox through a gap behind the entrance-door.

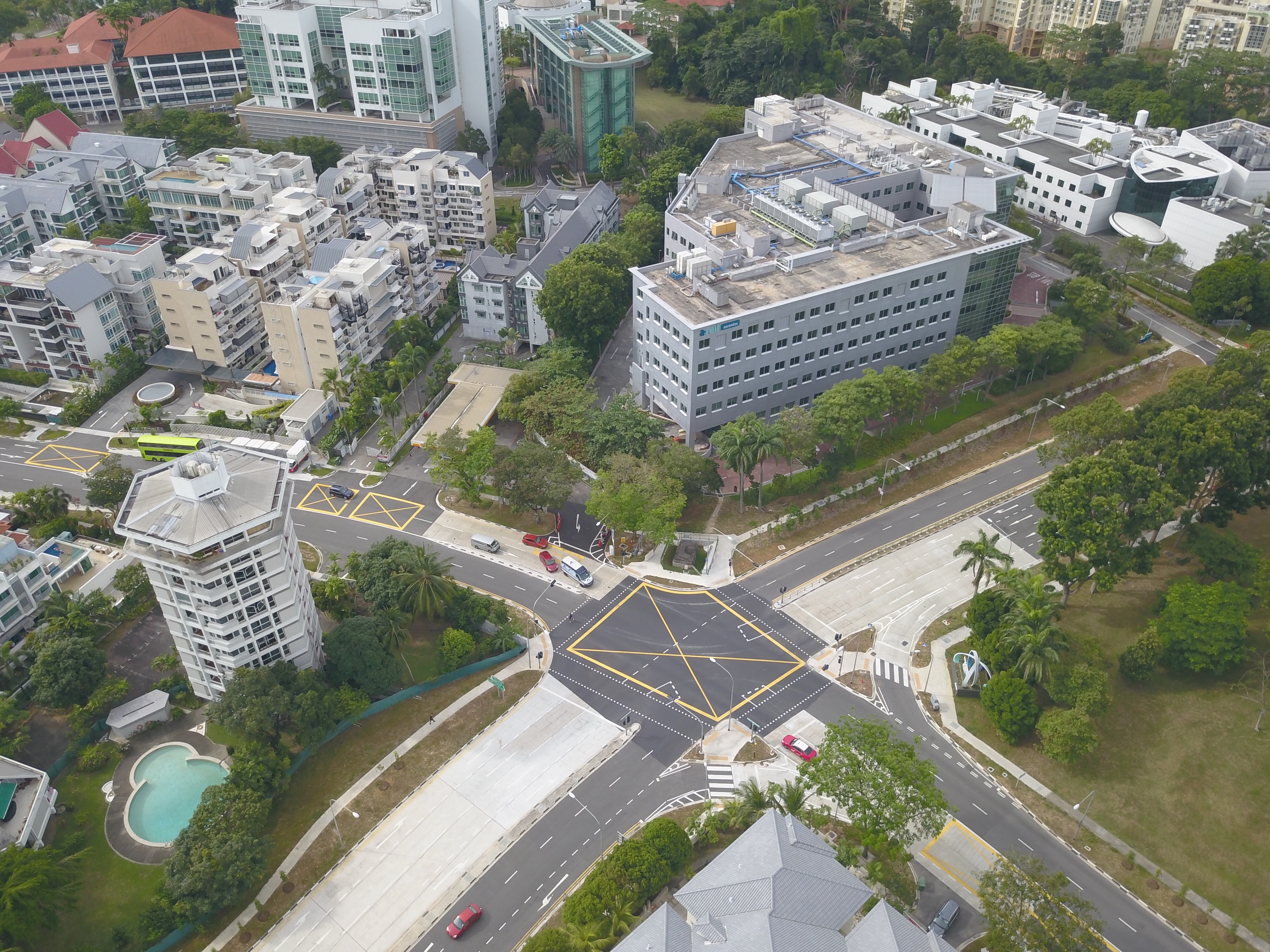
Aerial image of the Pasir Panjang Pillbox environs. The pillbox is in the centre above the intersection of Pasir Panjang and Science Park Roads.

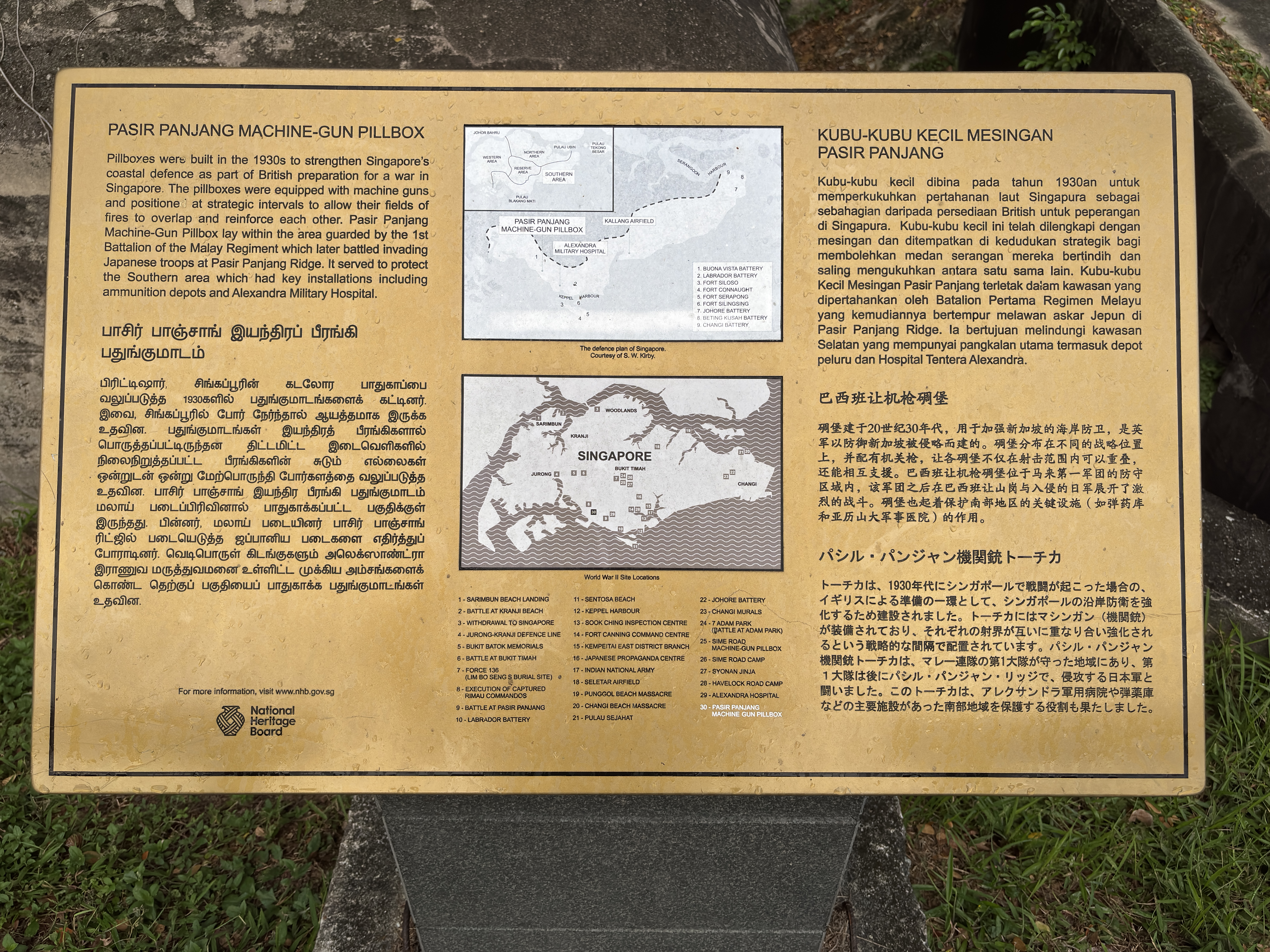
The memorial plaque in 2026 in English, Mandarin, Malay, Tamil, and Japanese.

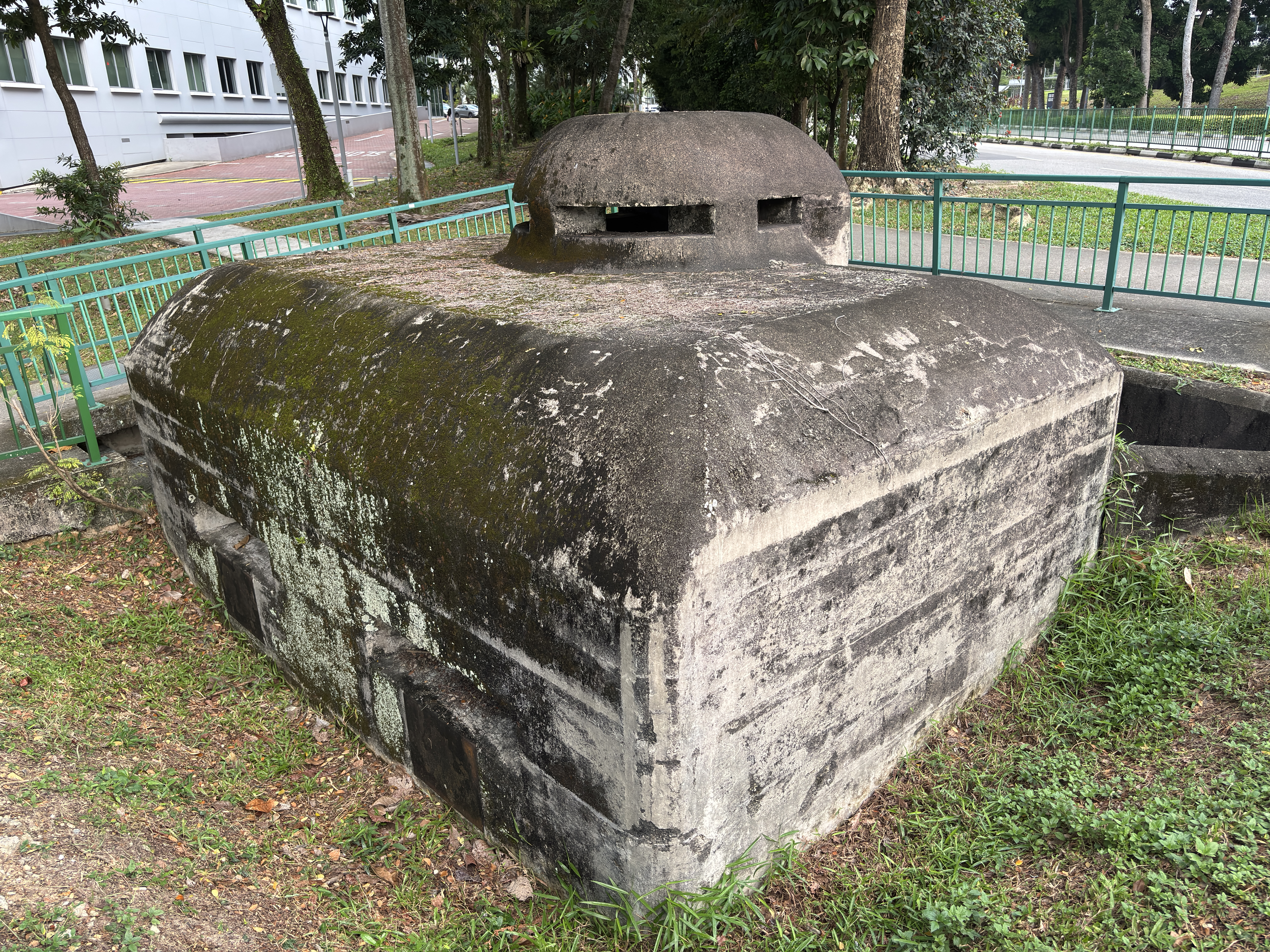
The pillbox in 2026
