= Royal Malay Regiment =

- Rejimen Askar Melayu DiRaja
- Cap Badge of the Rejimen Askar Melayu DiRaja
- Active: 23 November 1932 – present
- Country: Malaysia
- Branch: British Colonial Auxiliary Forces (1932–1956); Malaysian Army (1956–present)
- Type: Light Infantry
- Role: Ceremonial (1st Battalion); Mechanised Infantry (three battalion); Light Infantry (21 battalions); Elite Parachute infantry (three battalions)
- Size: 27 Battalion
- Part of: Malaysian Armed Forces
- Nickname: Malayan Gurkha
- Mottos: Ta'at Setia (Loyal and True)
- Colour of Beret: Rifle green
- March: Berbuat Jasa
- Engagements: Battle of Malaya (1941–42); Battle of Singapore (1942); Malayan Emergency (1948–60); Indonesia–Malaysia confrontation (1963–65); Battle of Mogadishu (1993–95); Moro attacks on Sabah (2013 standoff)
- Battle honours: Tanah Melayu 1941-1942; Singapura 1942; Darurat 1948-1960; Congo 1960-1963; Konfrontasi 1963-1965; Namibia 1989-1990; Kemboja 1992-1993; Somalia 1993-1995; Bosnia 1993-1998; Daulat Feb 2013

Commanders
- Colonel in Chief: HRH Tuanku Sallehuddin ibni al-Marhum Sultan Badlishah, Sultan of Kedah
- Notable commanders: Lieutenant Adnan Saidi

Insignia
- Camp Gate Flag

The Royal Malay Regiment (Malay: Rejimen Askar Melayu DiRaja; Jawi: ريجيمن عسکر ملايو دراج) is the premier unit of the Malaysian Army's three infantry regiments. At its largest, the Malay Regiment comprised 27 battalions. At present, three battalions are parachute trained and form part of the Malaysian Army Rapid Deployment Force. Another three battalions have been converted into mechanised infantry battalions while the remaining battalions are standard light infantry. The 1st Battalion Royal Malay Regiment acts as the ceremonial foot guards battalion for the King of Malaysia, and is usually accompanied by the Central Band of the Royal Malay Regiment. As its name suggests, the regiment only recruits ethnic Malays.

== History ==
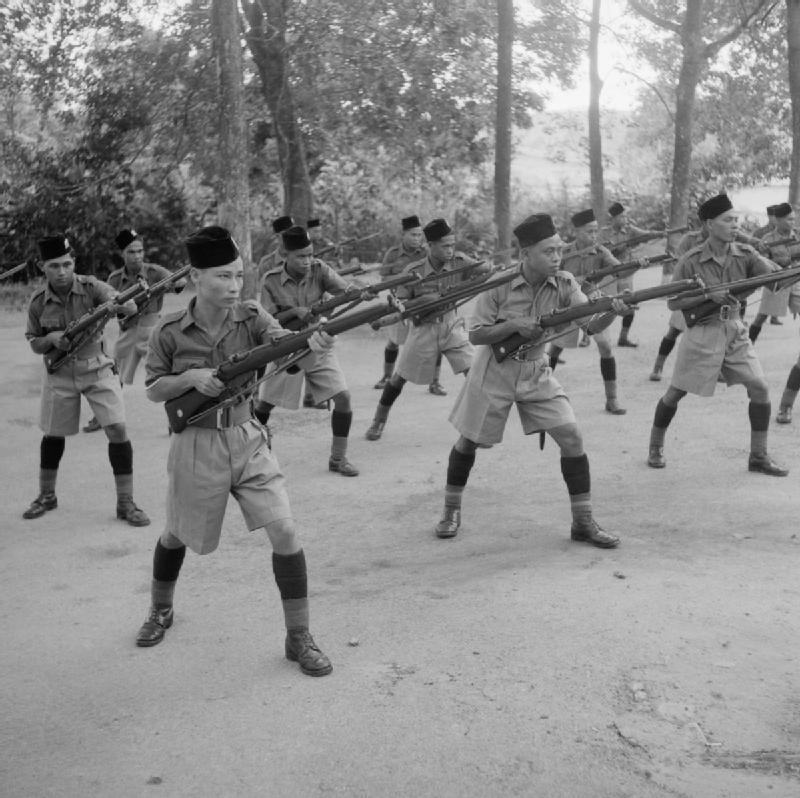
Soldiers of the Malay Regiment practising with bayonets on Singapore Island, October 1941

Beginning in 1920, local rulers in British Malaya, led by Sultan Iskandar (Sultan of Perak), Tuanku Muhammad (Yang di-Pertuan Besar of Negeri Sembilan), Raja Chulan (Perak royalty) and Abdullah Dahan (Undang of Rembau) urged Britain's Colonial Office to raise an infantry regiment from the colonial population. During this period, British and Indian troops, including the Burma Rifles, were stationed in Malaya for internal security duties. On 23 November 1932, the War Office approved the formation of the Malay Regiment as a British Colonial Auxiliary Forces unit consisting of British officers and Malayan other ranks. Shortly afterwards on 23 January 1933, the Federated Malay States passed the Malay Regiment Act, which stipulated that $70,000 of government funds would be used to purchase the Kong Sang Rubber Estate in Port Dickson and convert it into a military recruit training centre for the regiment's new recruits.

On 1 February 1933, 25 Malayans were chosen from 1,000 applicants to serve in the first company of the regiment. A month later on 1 March, the company was officially formed in Port Dickson under commanding officer G. McBruce and his adjutant, Captain K. G. Exham; the regiment's regimental sergeant major was A. E. McCarthy, and E. Oldfield served as its quartermaster sergeant. Since the company was solely an attempt to "find out how the Malays would react to military discipline", it was designated as the 1st (Experimental) Company. On 1 January 1935, the company was expanded into a regiment with 150 personnel. Recruitment efforts for the unit proceeded to accelerate, and a further 232 recruits were formed into two rifle companies and a headquarters section which included a Vickers machine gun platoon, a signallers section and a corps of drummers.

By 1 January 1938, the regiment had a complement of 17 British officers, six Malayan officers, 11 warrant officers and 759 non-commissioned officers and other ranks. In the leadup to World War II, the regiment's training intensified with more frequent and longer marches and exercises and both regimental and brigade level. The regiment also began training with mortars and anti-tank weapons. In March 1941, Governor Shenton Thomas authorised an increase of the regiment's size to two battalions, which along with the 2nd Battalion of the British Army's Loyal Regiment (North Lancashire) formed the 1st Malaya Infantry Brigade. Five months later, a Bren Gun Carrier platoon was formed under Captain R. R. C. Carter and began training with the 2nd Loyal Regiment.

=== Battle of Pasir Panjang Ridge ===
The first clash between the Malay Regiment and the Imperial Japanese Armed Forces occurred on 13 February 1942 at around 1400 hrs when the Japanese 18th Division attacked the south-western coast along the Pasir Panjang Ridge and across Ayer Rajah Road. That morning, the Japanese 56th Infantry Regiment, with considerable artillery support, attacked. B Company of 1st Battalion, Malay Regiment, defending their position on the ridge came under heavy fire from Japanese troops supported by artillery and tanks and were forced to retreat to the rear. However, before their withdrawal was complete, the Japanese broke through B Company's position encircling the entire company.

When their ammunition ran out, B Company fought on savagely in hand-to-hand combat using bayonets. Captain Yazid Ahmad of the Federated Malay States Volunteer Force, on secondment to the Malay Regiment, took over B Company. They were reduced owing to mounting officer casualties: in a heroic and glorious last stand eclipsing the later achievements of 2nd Lieutenant Adnan Saidi. Captain Yazid died where he stood at the head of his men. A few soldiers from B Company managed to break out from the encirclement while other survivors were captured and became prisoners-of-war. The company's destruction triggered an immediate night withdrawal of both the 44th Indian and 1st Malaya Brigade to the general line running from Mount Echo (at the junction of Ayer Rajah and Depot Road) to Buona Vista.

=== Battle of Bukit Chandu ===
On 14 February, the Japanese launched a further heavy attack at 0830 hours, supported by intense mortar and artillery fire, on the front held by the 1st Malaya infantry Brigade. The fighting included bitter hand-to-hand combat with heavy losses on both sides. At 1600 hours, an attack supported by tanks eventually succeeded in penetrating the left flank where the defenders were forced back to a line from the junction of the Ayer Rajah and Depot Road through the Brick Works and along the canal to Bukit Chermin. Owing to the failure of units on both its flanks to hold their ground, the 1st Malaya Infantry Brigade withdrew at 1430 hours. At this point, the Malay Regiment's C Company were ordered to move to a new defence position, Pt. 226 at Bukit Chandu. Had the Japanese gained control of the hill and ridge that overlooked the north of the island, it would have given them direct passage to the Alexandra area where the British army had its main ammunition and supply depots, a military hospital and other key installations.

Second Lieutenant Adnan Saidi and his men of 7 Platoon, C Company of the 1st Bn Malay Regiment made their well-known final stand against the Japanese attack on Bukit Chandu, now being commemorated as Reflections at Bukit Chandu. Saidi's bravery was exemplified in the battle where he was killed along with many of the Malay Regiment in the last defensive battle at Pasir Panjang. His motto "Biar Putih Tulang Jangan Putih Mata" is still remembered. The translation loosely means, "it is better to die fighting than to live crying in regret till the eyes becomes blind." In other words, "Death Before Dishonour". Separated from D Company by a big canal on fire with oil flowing from Normanton Depot, C Company were prevented from retreating further south. C Company Commander Captain Rix died during the early part of the engagement whereupon command automatically passed to Saidi.

The Japanese troops pressed their attack on Bukit Chandu in the afternoon. As a ruse, they sent a group of soldiers dressed in captured Indian Army uniforms who attempted to pass themselves off as Punjabi troops. However, Saidi saw through the ruse as Indian soldiers marched in threes and Japanese troops marched in fours. When the disguised soldiers reached the Malay Regiment's defence line, C Company's squad opened fire with their Lewis guns, killing some and badly wounding the rest — those who survived rolled and crawled downhill to save themselves. Four of the top marksmen in the previous years military competition held in Singapore were men from C Company.

Two hours later, the Japanese launched an all-out assault in great numbers despite being within point blank range of the Australian artillery. To save ammunition, the artillery did not open fire, a manoeuvre that greatly surprised the Japanese. The shell that had been "saved" by the Australian artillery was handed over to the Japanese army the next day when General Percival surrendered Singapore to General Yamashita. The Malay Regiment were soon overwhelmed by the attack. Although greatly outnumbered and short of ammunition and supplies, they continued to put up resistance. Reports claimed that Saidi manned a Lewis gun others engaged in fierce hand-to-hand combat using only bayonets. Nevertheless, the troops stood their ground and frustrated the Japanese. Saidi was seriously wounded but refused to retreat; instead he encouraged his men to fight to the last, showing a disregard for personal danger that inspired the company to fight on. Saidi was later captured and tortured before being bayoneted to death.

On 28 February 1942, four captive Malay Regiment officers were executed by firing squad in Pasir Panjang for refusing to join the Japanese army when instructed to do so by a Malaysian collaborator, Major Mustapha Hussein of the F Kikan. They were Lieutenant (No.8) Ariffin Hj Sulaiman, Lieutenant (No.29) Abdul Wahid Jidin, Lieutenant (No.57) Abdullah Saad and Lieutenant (No.12) Ibrahim Sidek. Lieutenant Ahmad Noordin of 'A' Company, 1st Battalion was executed earlier on 15 February 1942 while Lieutenant Muhammad Isa Mahmud of HQ Company, 1st Battalion was executed on 12 February 1943. Most of the surviving captured Malay Regiment officers defected or joined the Imperial Japanese Army.

During the Malayan campaign, primarily between 12-14 February 1942 in Singapore, the Malay Regiment suffered a total of 159 killed (six British officers, seven Malaysian officers, and 146 other ranks) and a large but unspecified number wounded. On the whole the British were not convinced that the Malays were a martial race in view of the widespread desertions among Malay Regiment troops leading to most of the remaining Malaysian soldiers being disarmed before they entered Johor and were ordered home. A small core of well trained and loyal Malaysian officers and non-commissioned officers fought to the end in the defence of Singapore.

=== Reconstruction during the British Military Administration ===
By mid 1946, the idea of a multi-racial Malay Regiment, raised after the war, had been dropped due to opposition from state rulers and governments. The all-Malay Malay Regiment would become part of a Federation Army of divisional strength thereby freeing up British regiments for other more strategic duties. The British plan to develop a strategic reserve of three brigades held in Britain would require the raising of more local regimental strength. The Overseas Defence Committee thereafter endorsed a gradual expansion of the Malay Regiment to six battalions by 1950 whereby the Malay Regiment would be used mainly for internal security, with multi-racial formations in the supporting arms. But in fact by 1954 it reached seven battalions at the height of The Emergency.

=== The Malayan Emergency ===
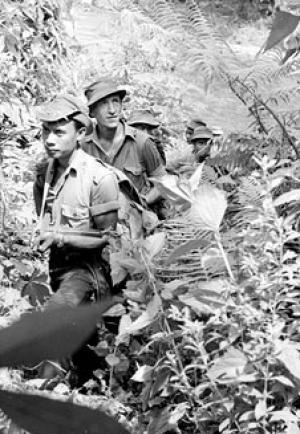
Soldiers of the Malay Regiment during a jungle patrol in the Temenggor area of northern Malaya., c.1953

By 1948, the British Army had seven partially reformed Gurkha battalions in Malaya, in addition to two battalions of the Malay Regiment. By mid-1948, only three British battalions remained in Malaya to provide security to the Federation. The Malay Regiment also played a major role against the Malayan National Liberation Army (MNLA) when an eventual seven battalions served during the Malayan Emergency, with the 3rd battalion, which was raised in 1948. During the campaigns privates carried a No.4 and No.5 .303 service rifle in sporting guise to hide it for jungle warfare. A sling swivel on the side of the butt was one feature. Another was the flash eliminator on the muzzle designed to mask firing with a bayonet to affix.

The regiment gained the 'royal' prefix in 1960 when many of its officers were still trained at Royal Military Academy Sandhurst. It became the Royal Malay Regiment and by 1961 had a strength of 11 battalions. The Sovereign's Colours were received in 1963, seven years after Malaysia became an independent country.

=== Indonesian confrontation ===
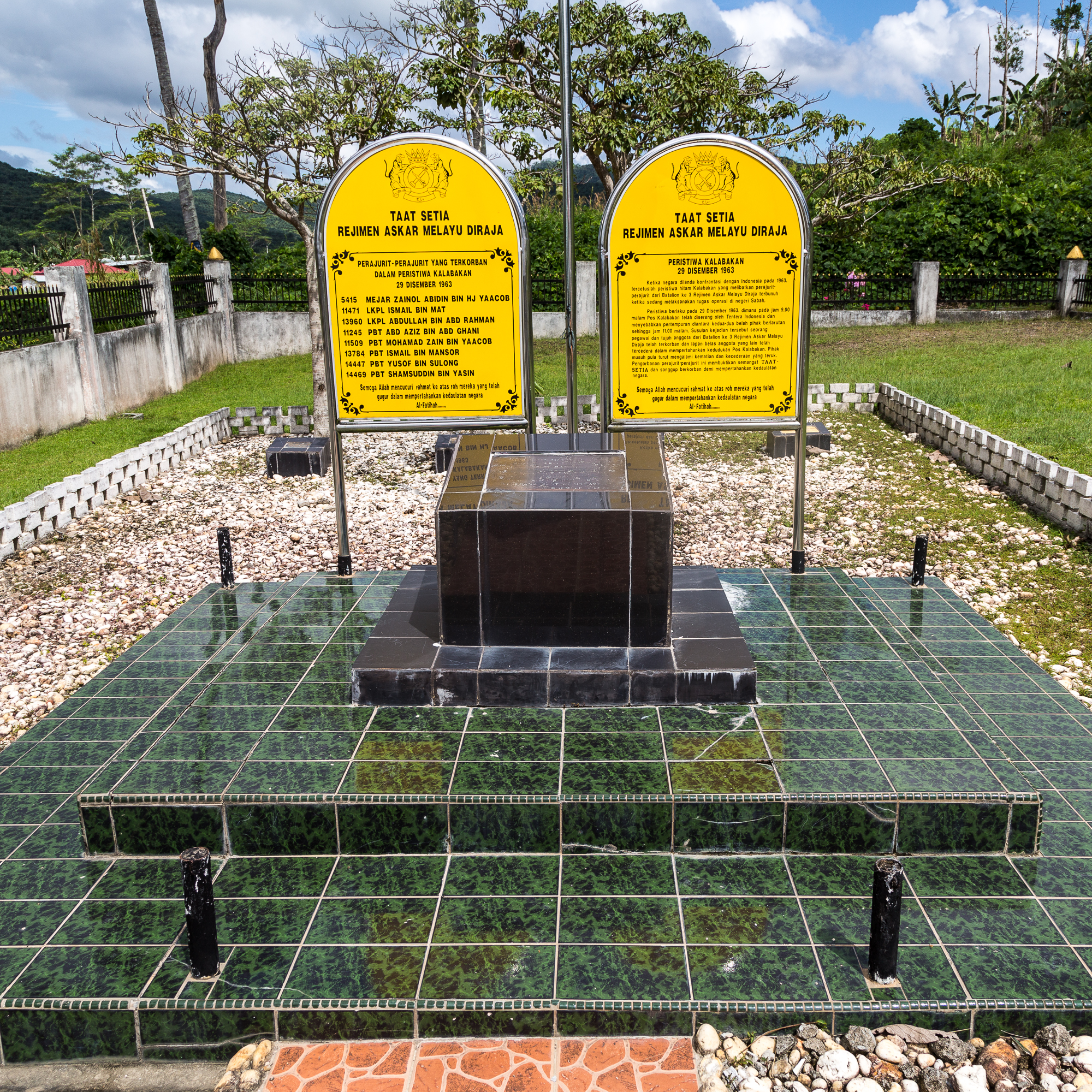
The Memorial in Kalabakan, Sabah commemorates the seven Royal Malay Regiment soldiers and their commander who were killed on 29 December 1963 when intruders from Indonesia attacked their camp.

During the confrontation, the Royal Malay Regiment were also deployed in Sabah and Sarawak. During this deployment, the Kalabakan incident occurred on 29 December 1963. An outpost in Kalabakan in Tawau, established and manned by members of C Company of the 3rd Battalion under the command of Maj Zainal Abidin bin Haji Yaacob was ambushed by "volunteers" of the North Kalimantan Army while performing their Maghrib prayers. The company reacted and stood to, and were finally able to repel the attacking force. However, seven members of the company, including Major Zainal Abidin were killed and 16 others wounded.

== Serving the United Nations ==
=== Malayan Special Forces in Congo ===
The 4th Bn Royal Malay Regiment under the command of Lt Kol Ungku Nazaruddin formed the core of the Malayan Special Force that served under UN command in the Congo in 1960. In turn, the 6th Bn Royal Malay, 7th Bn Royal Malay and 2nd Bn Royal Malay also served in the Congo under UN command. 2nd Bn Royal Malay ended the Congo deployment on 28 April 1963 when they returned home.

=== Somalia ===
As part of the United Nations UNOSOM II operation in Somalia, the 19th Bn Royal Malay Regiment (Mechanised) started deployment of its 870 members in Mogadishu from 18 June 1993. The battalion was involved in the combat rescue of US Army Rangers during the Battle of Mogadishu together with Pakistan Army's 10th Battalion of the Baloch Regiment, where the battalion provided the Radpanzer Condor armoured personnel carriers for the QRF force of the 10th Mountain Division that effected the rescue. One member of the battalion, a driver of one of the APCs, Private Mat Aznan (posthumously promoted to Corporal) was killed and four APCs destroyed during the rescue.

=== Bosnia and Herzegovina ===
23rd Bn Royal Malay and 3rd Armour formed MALBATT I as part of the United Nations Protection Force and started deployment in September 1993. 23 Bn Royal Malay served until August 1994 and were replaced by MALBATT II comprising 5 Bn Royal Malay and 2nd Armour. MALBATT III (28 March 1995 – November 1995) was formed from 12 Bn Royal Malay and 1st Armour. Malcon 1 (2 Royal Ranger Regiment & 4th Armour), Malcon 2 (18 RMR & 2nd Armour), Malcon 4 (2 RMR & 1 Armour)

== Regimental Crest ==
The regiment's crest depicts a pair of tigers supporting an Oriental Crown. Within the circle of the crest are a kris and a scabbard with the Regimental motto "Ta'at Setia" written in Jawi, meaning "Loyal and True". Major G. McI. S. Bruce and Captain K. G. Exham, the founding officers of this regiment, designed the crest.

Three colours were chosen – green (the Muslim colour), yellow (for Malay royalty) and red (for the British Army influence).

== Royal Guards ==
- Istana Negara, Kuala Lumpur

== Battle honours ==
- Second World War:
  - Tanah Melayu 1941–42
  - Singapura 1942
- Darurat 1948–1960
- Konfrontasi 1963–1965 – Confrontation with Indonesia
- Battle of Mogadishu, Somalia 1993–1995
- Bosnia 1993–1998
- Namibia 1989–1990
- Cambodia 1992–1993
- Republic of the Congo (Leopoldville) 1960–1963
- East Timor - Operation Astute 2006
- Lahad Datu 2013

=== UN Peacekeeping missions ===
- Democratic Republic of the Congo 1960–1963 – UN Peacekeeping
- Namibia 1989–1990 – UN Peacekeeping
- Cambodia 1992–1993 – UN Peacekeeping mission (UNTAC)
- Bosnia and Herzegovina 1993–1998 – UN Peacekeeping

== Alliances ==
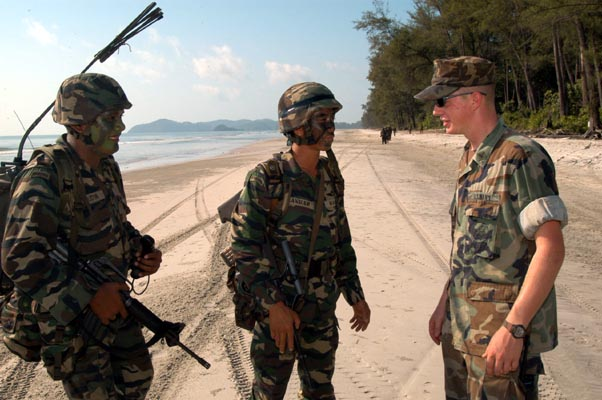
Construction Mechanic 3rd Class Michael Klinegardner, a member of the Beachmaster Unit (BMU) One, detachment Western Pacific's craft control team, explains his role in landing craft, air cushioned (LCAC) operations to landing force members of the Royal Malay Regiment (RMR)

- Australia – The Royal Australian Regiment
- United Kingdom – The Royal Anglian Regiment; 1st Bn
- United Kingdom – The Duke of Lancaster's Regiment (King's Lancashire and Border); 2nd Bn
- United Kingdom – The Royal Welsh; 4th Bn
- United Kingdom – The Royal Scots Borderers; 5th Bn
- United Kingdom – The Rifles; 6th Bn
- United Kingdom – The Royal Gurkha Rifles
- New Zealand – The Royal New Zealand Infantry Regiment; 7th Bn

== Battalions ==
The RAMD has a total of 27 battalions. 21 of these are standard light infantry battalions, with three roled as mechanised infantry and three as parachute infantry. The final battalion is a support unit.

=== 1st Battalion Royal Malay Regiment ===
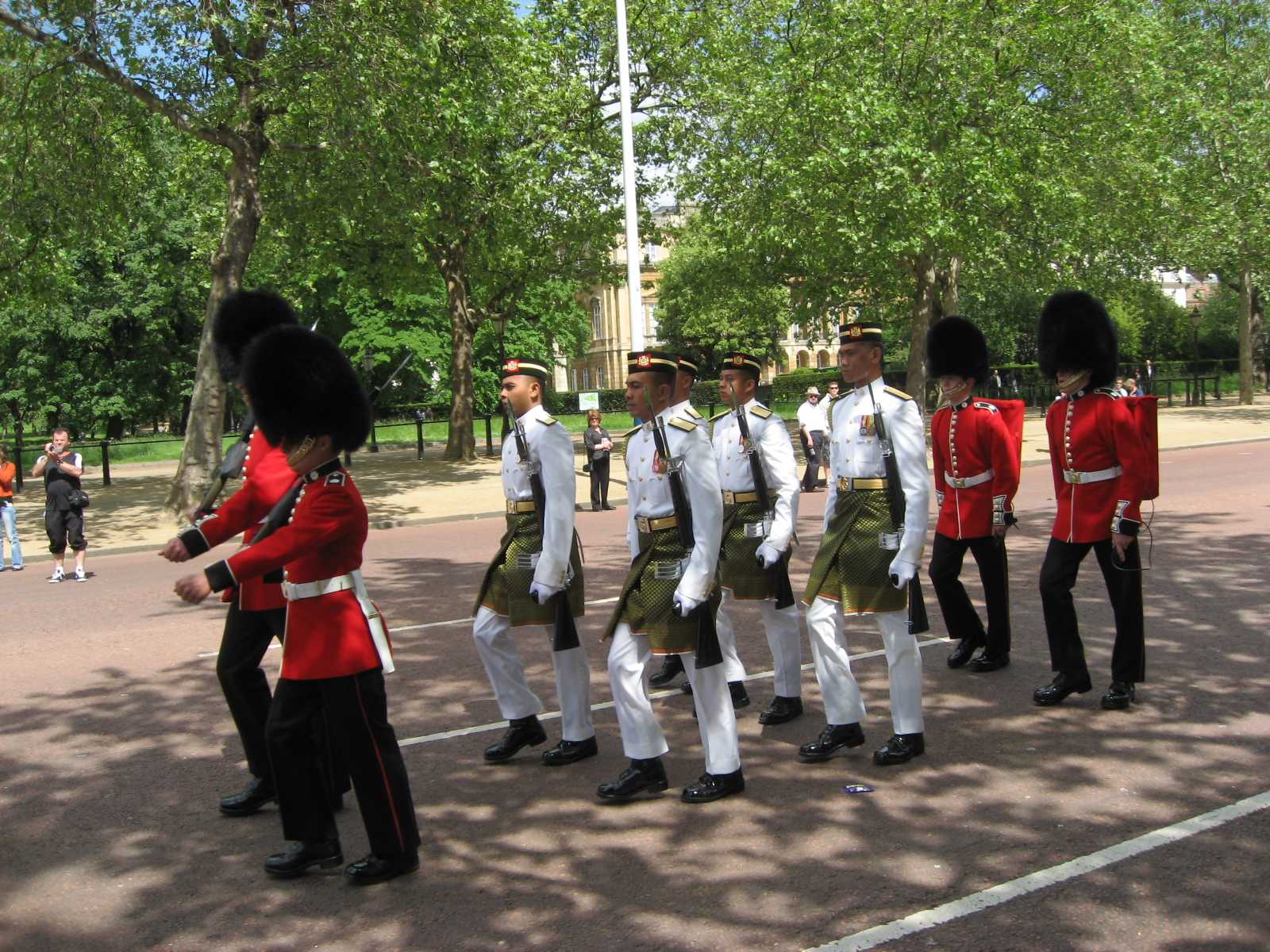
Malay and British troops parading at the Mall in London

The 1st Bn Royal Malay is the most senior infantry battalion of the regiment and the first to be raised. This was also the battalion group to which Lieutenant Adnan Bin Saidi was posted. In 2008, the 1st Battalion became the first all-Muslim unit to provide the Queen's Guard at Buckingham Palace as well as the first guard from a nation that was not a Commonwealth realm. Its primary role is more towards ceremonial functions, as the representative of the nation's defence element in becoming the guard of honour during a state visit. They are tasked to guard the National Palace in Kuala Lumpur as well as the premises of the Ministry of Defence Building. Primarily the battalion's responsibilities are to perform public duties within the capital in support of state-ceremonial events.

=== 5th Battalion Royal Malay Regiment ===
5 Bn Royal Malay was an Allied regiment of the King's Own Scottish Borderers Regiment (KOSB) of the British Army's defunct Scottish Division. The Alliance was formed during 1st Bn KOSB's service in Malaya during the Malayan Emergency. Several traditions of KOSB are retained by the 5 Bn. The shoulder flash of officers and men of 5 Bn follows the regimental facing colours of KOSB.

5 Bn also maintains the tradition of having a pipe band. The tradition started when an officer of KOSB was seconded to 5 Bn Royal Malay in 1953, having raised its drumline during the battalion's formation. The Scottish officer introduced the bagpipe and helped train the pipers for the pipe band. Up until the disbandment of what was then the 1st Battalion (Royal Scots Borderers) of the Royal Regiment of Scotland in 2021 to form part of the Ranger Regiment of the British Army, the pipe bands of both infantry battalions maintained their alliance for 68 years - a tradition thus continued by the remaining pipes and drums of said regiment today. The 5th Battalion Pipes and Drums, in the past, been invited to attend the Edinburgh Festival. The last time 5 Bn attended the festival was in January 1990, celebrating the KOSB's 300th anniversary.

=== 6th Battalion Royal Malay Regiment ===
The 6th battalion, Royal Malay Regiment was formed on 1 May 1952 and later deployed to Quetta Camp in Kluang, Johor on 3 November 1952. Though formed on 1 May, the official date for the formation of the battalion is recorded as 3 November 1952. On its formation, the 6th Battalion had British officers from the 1st Battalion of the Dorset and Devonshire Regiment seconded to form the command core of the battalion.

The seconded officers were gradually replaced by Malay officers and in early 1954, 21 of the 26 officers of the battalion consisted of Malay officers replacing their British counterparts. Jeneral (Rtd) Tun Ibrahim Ismail was the first Malay Commanding Officer of the battalion, taking command from 11 August 1958 until 14 June 1960. He later went on to become the first Malay Chief of the Malaysian Armed Forces (now called Chief of Defence Forces)

The battalion is a Standard Infantry Battalion of the Malaysian Army. The battalion has participated in the Kris Mere exercises with the New Zealand Army the battalion was also deployed to The Congo as part of the Malayan Special Force serving under the United Nations Command.

=== 7th Battalion Royal Malay Regiment ===
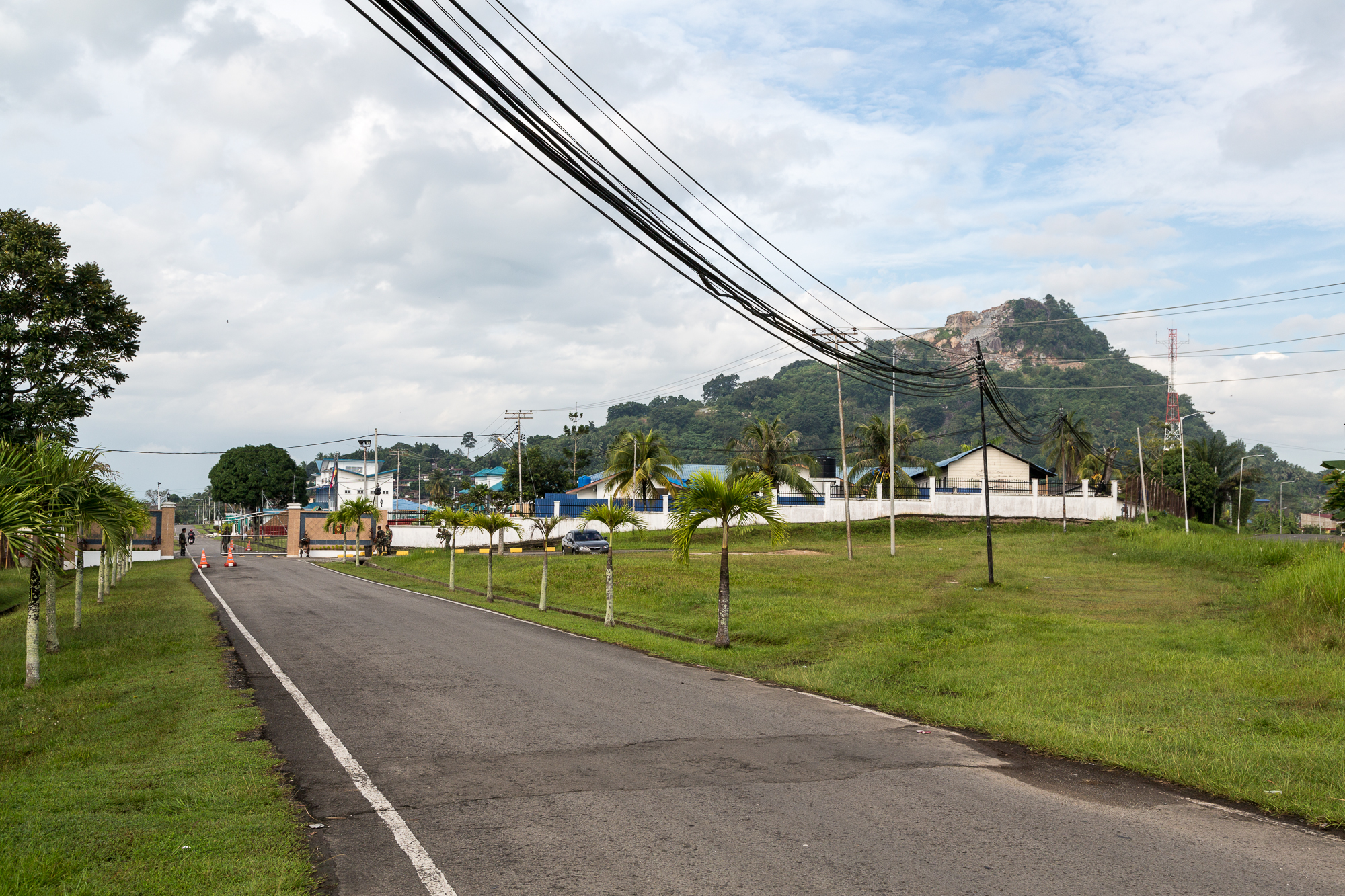
Military compound of the 7th Battalion Royal Malay Regiment in Tawau, Sabah.

7 Bn Royal Malay Regiment is an infantry unit of the RMR. It is currently allied with the Royal New Zealand Infantry Regiment of the New Zealand Defence Force. It is currently based at Kubota Camp in Tawau, Sabah

=== 12th Battalion Royal Malay Regiment ===
12 RAMD is the 12th Battalion, Royal Malay Regiment (Mechanized) or 12 RAMD (Mekanize) in the Malaysian Army. It is one of the three mechanized infantry battalions in the RAMD (alongside 14 RAMD and 19 RAMD), equipped with the ACV-300 Adnan for fast and protected movement. The battalion was raised on 14 May 1969 and is currently based at Daralockwood Camp (or Kem Daralockwood) in Kuantan, Pahang. It operates under the 4th Mechanized Brigade and regularly conducts training, parades, and community aid like delivering supplies during floods in Pahang.

=== 17th Battalion Royal Malay Regiment ===
The 17th Battalion, Royal Malay Regiment (17 RAMD) was formed on 1 August 1970. It is an elite force of paratroopers assigned to the Malaysian Army's 10th Parachute Brigade. On 10 October 1994, 17th PARA undertook a rapid deployment exercise, supported by elements of the Malaysian Special Forces Group (Gerup Gerak Khas) and PASKAL, as well as operational support from the Royal Malaysian Navy and Royal Malaysian Air Force. The exercise centred around a scenario of the retaking of Langkawi International Airport from an invading force by the Rapid Deployment Force spearheaded by the paratroopers.

=== 19th Battalion Royal Malay Regiment ===
19 RAMD is the 19th Battalion of the Royal Malay Regiment (Mechanised) in the Malaysian Army. It serves as a mobile armoured infantry unit using APCs like the Condor and AV8 Gempita, and is known for its "Harimau Besi" (Iron Tiger) nickname and motto "Tegak Teguh Gagah Perkasa". The battalion is currently based in Sungai Petani, Kedah, and regularly conducts tough training exercises such as Harimau Besi to stay combat-ready. Its proudest moment came in 1993 during the Battle of Mogadishu in Somalia as part of MALBATT-1. Malaysian troops used their APCs to help rescue trapped US forces in intense urban fighting, where one soldier, Mat Aznan Awang, was killed and many earned bravery awards.

=== 26th Battalion Royal Malay Regiment ===
Newly activated standard infantry battalion, 26th Royal Malay Regiment (26 RAMD) will be placed under the formation of the 5th Infantry Brigade, 5th Malaysian Infantry Division based at the West Coast of Sabah, Malaysia. It is currently based at the Kukusan Camp in Tawau, Sabah.

== Notable people ==
=== Lieutenant Adnan Bin Saidi ===
Adnan Saidi led the reinforced 42-strong No.7 Platoon of 'C' Company, 1st Battalion of the Malay Regiment at the Bukit Chandu (Opium Hill) position on 12–14 February 1942. Although heavily outnumbered, Adnan refused to surrender and urged his men to fight until the end. They held off the Japanese for two days amid heavy enemy shelling and shortages of food and ammunition. Adnan was shot but carried on fighting. After the battle was lost, the wounded Adnan was taken prisoner by Japanese soldiers, who tied him to a cherry tree and bayoneted him to death. According to some, he was also slashed and his body parts were burnt. Adnan epitomises the bravery and tenacity of the Malay Regiment. Because of this, he is considered a hero by many Malaysians and Singaporeans today.

=== Captain Hamid Bin Awang ===
Based on intelligence gathered indicating that a force of 40 to 50 communist guerrillas would converge on Gunung Pueh, "D" Company of 2nd Royal Malay Regiment led by Captain Hamid was tasked in a search and destroy mission.

On April 7, 1973, Captain Hamid and his company detected a communist guerrilla encampment. He organised his company for an assault on the camp. Captain Hamid fired a round of M79 grenade launcher to mark the start of the attack and rushed into the communist guerrillas camp. In the heat of battle, a communist guerrilla tried to shoot down one of Captain Hamid's men. Captain Hamid immediately rushed to the guerrilla and hit him in the back of the neck with his grenade launcher's butt.

Captain Hamid's company scored three kills and captured three enemy weapons, as well as ammunition and assorted equipment. Captain Hamid's company suffered one KIA. Captain Hamid was awarded the SP on 6 June 1973.

== See also ==
- Royal Ranger Regiment (Rejimen Renjer DiRaja)
- The Royal Malay Regiment during the changing of the guard in London
