= Bukit Chandu =

Hill in Singapore

Coordinates: 1.2791°N 103.7918°E

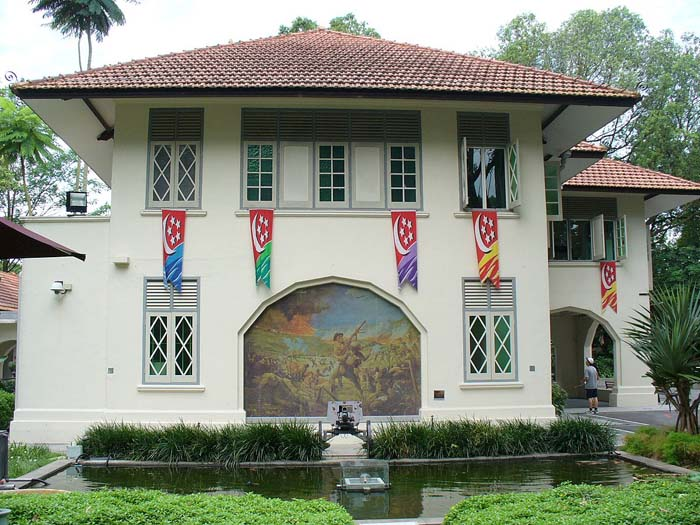
- Reflections at Bukit Chandu

Naming
- Etymology: Opium
- English translation: Opium Hill
- Language of name: Malay; Singapore English

Geography
- Location within Singapore
- Location: Singapore
- Parent range: Southern Ridges

Geology
- Mountain type: Hill

Bukit Chandu (Note: English: Opium Hill) is a hill located within Kent Ridge Park in Singapore. It was the site of the Battle of Bukit Chandu, a significant engagement that took place on 14 February 1942 during the Battle of Singapore in World War II.

== Etymology ==
The name of the hill, Bukit Chandu, reflects its historical association with an opium-processing factory that once operated at its base. This connection to the former factory gave rise to the name, which translates from Malay as "Opium Hill."

== History ==
Bukit Chendu is the site of the Battle of Pasir Panjang during the February 1942 invasion by the Japanese. On this ridge, fewer than 100 Malay Regiment soldiers waged against a Japanese army of 18,000. Despite being outnumbered many times over and later being out of bullets, they held their ground for two days, finally fighting hand-to-hand. Most were killed and many were tortured, their bodies subsequently found to have been mutilated.

== Attractions ==
As appreciation for their gallantry, the Reflections at Bukit Chandu interpretive centre was established in a restored colonial bungalow at 31K Pepys Road, which opened on 15 February 2002, sixty years after the fall of Singapore. The centre tells the battle history and honors the Malay Regiment's gallantry, which has been called an enduring record of grit and sacrifice. Now, Bukit Chendu represents Singapore's strengthand a commemoration to all the lives lost in the defense of Singapore.
