= Kent Ridge =

- Subzone of Queenstown Planning Area

Name transcription(s)
  - Chinese: 肯特岗
  - Pinyin: Kěntègāng
  - Malay: Kent Ridge
  - Tamil: கெண்ட் ரிஜ்
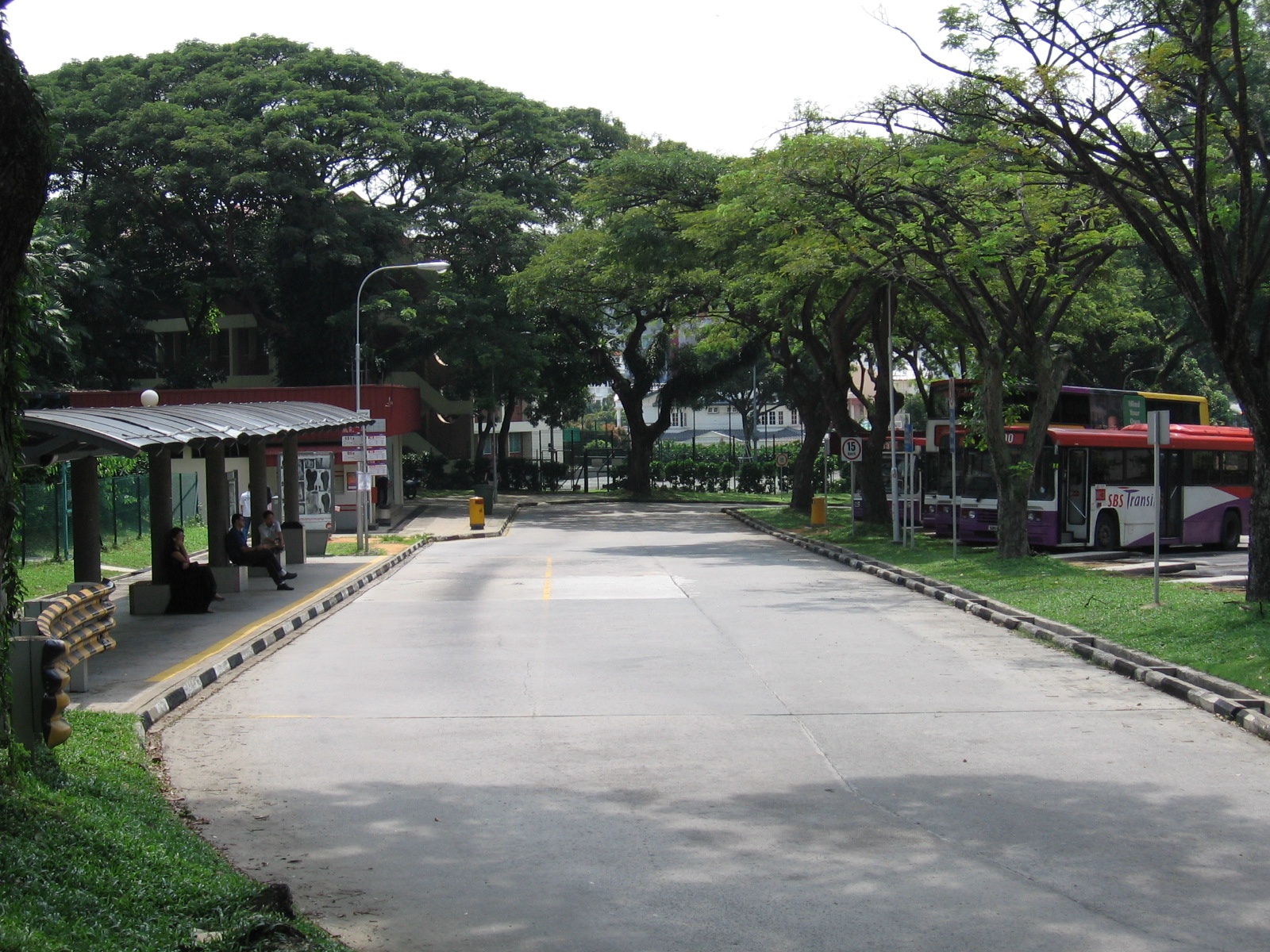
- Kent Ridge Bus Terminal on Clementi Road, Singapore.
- Interactive map of Kent Ridge
- Country: Singapore

Kent Ridge is the name of a ridge and a neighbourhood located in Pasir Panjang, in the Queenstown Planning Area of Singapore. The area is notable for housing two parks within the Southern Ridges, Kent Ridge Park and HortPark. The main campus of the National University of Singapore is located adjacent to it, straddling along the southern boundary of Kent Ridge. It is served by the Kent Ridge MRT station.

The area occupied by Kent Ridge was formerly known as Pasir Panjang Ridge, and was originally a lowland evergreen rainforest. The natural vegetation of the area mainly consists of groves of Tembusu, Acacias and Dillenias. When the first settlers arrived in Singapore in the early 19th century, they grew crops such as rubber, pepper, gambier and pineapple on the ridge. During World War II, it was used as a fortress by the British in the defence of Singapore. Many of the plantations were destroyed or abandoned during the Japanese Occupation (1942–1945), allowing the crops to grow wild.

On 23 February 1954, the Governor of Singapore, Sir John Fearns Nicoll unveiled a plaque which declared the area had been renamed Kent Ridge to commemorate the visit by the Duchess of Kent and her son, the Duke of Kent, on 3 October 1952. The plaque was erected at the junction of what is now Kent Ridge Road and South Buona Vista Road.

The ridge contains Bukit Chandu, alternatively known as Opium Hill (in Malay), after the opium processing factory owned by the British East India Company that was at the foot of the hill until 1910. During 12–14 February 1942, it was the site of the Battle of Bukit Chandu, fought by the 159 survivors of the Malay Regiment led by Lieutenant Adnan Bin Saidi against the 13,000 men of Lieutenant-General Mutaguchi Renya's 18th Division. The Malay Regiment's position on the hill was overrun by the Japanese and the battle ended in hand-to-hand combat after the last few defenders ran out of ammunition. All the officers except one, Lieutenant Abbas Abdul-Manan, and most of the men, were massacred in the aftermath.
