= HortPark =

Park and garden located in Singapore

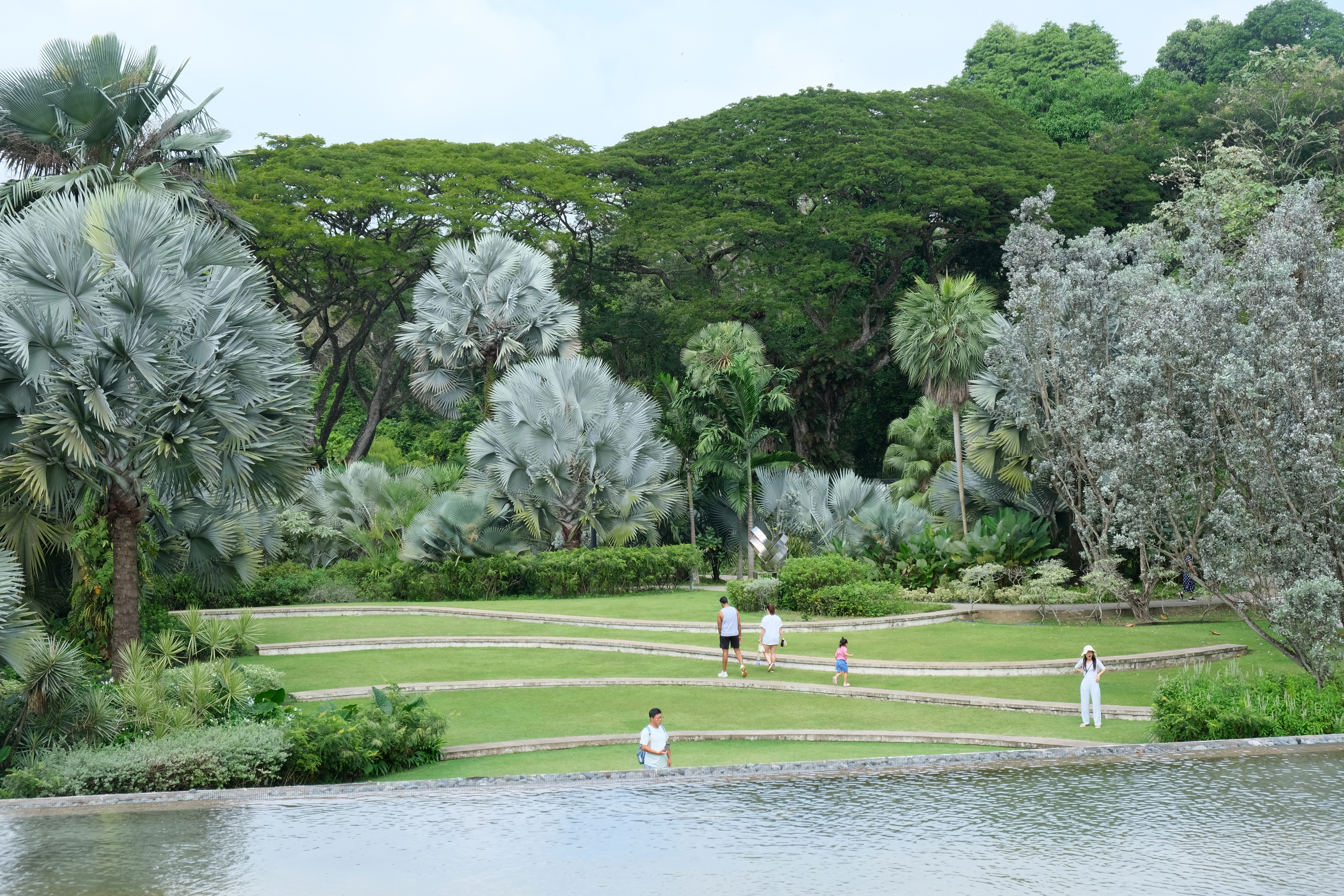
Silver Garden in HortPark

HortPark is a 9-hectare (22-acre) park located in Queenstown, Singapore. It opened in December 2007 and was officially launched by Prime Minister Lee Hsien Loong in May 2008.

Situated in the Southern Ridges, HortPark is connected to nearby parks, namely Kent Ridge Park, Telok Blangah Hill Park, and Mount Faber Park via elevated walkways and connecting bridges.

== Features ==
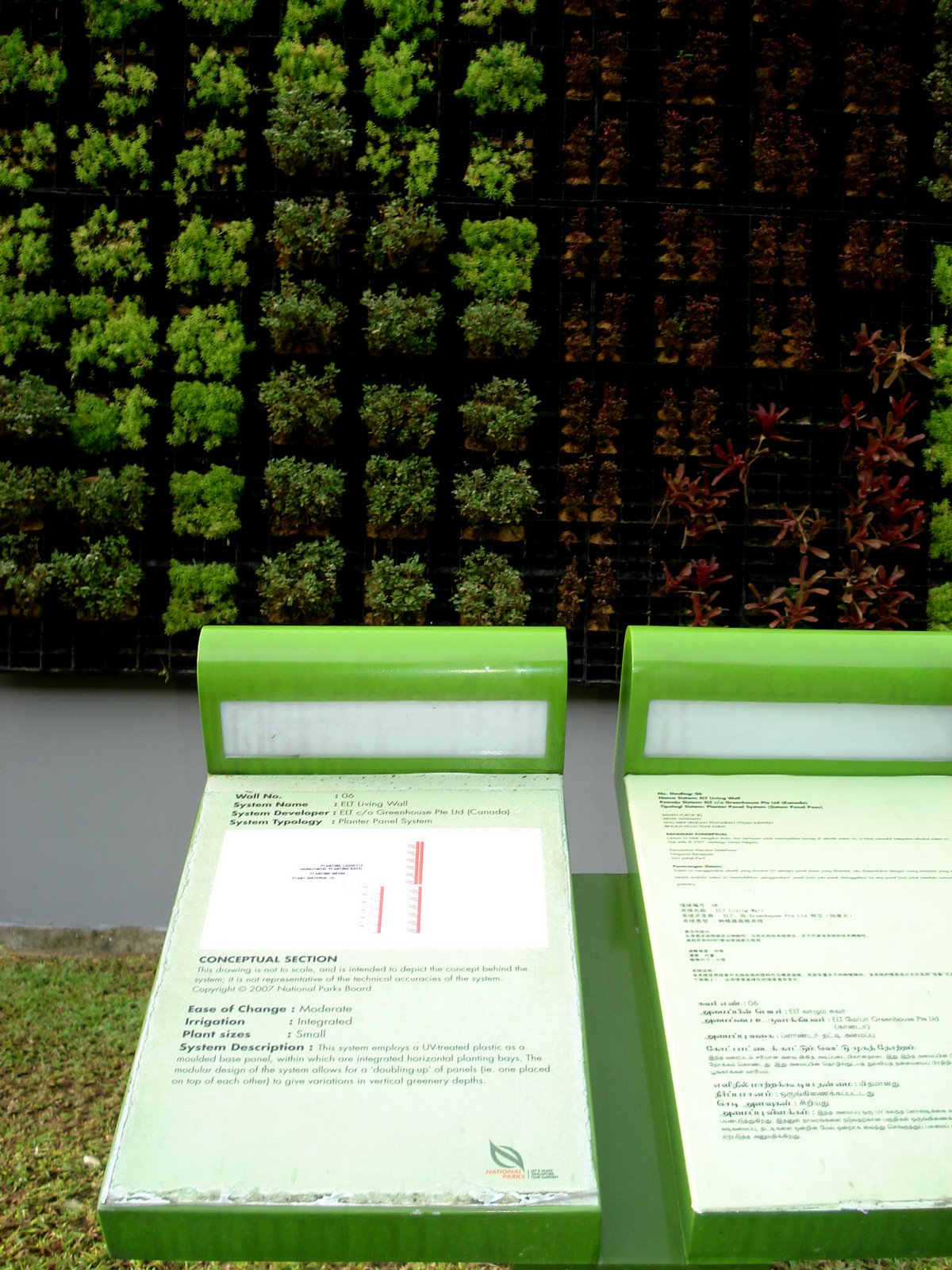
A green wall with information signage

HortPark comprises the following features:

- HortCentre
- Greenhouse Retail and Workshop
- Hands-On House
- HortLawn and Event Lawn
- Theme Gardens
- Butterfly Gardens

=== HortCentre ===
The two-story HortCentre building also serves as the visitor centre. It showcases gardening attractions, which include the Green Roof and the Lifestyle Corner. The building was one of the winners of 2008 International Architecture Award for Best New Global Design. It is also one of the 11 finalists for Urban Land Institute's (ULI) Awards for Excellence 2009.

Green Roof is a rooftop display of the different types of green roof systems and plants suitable for green roof planting. Lifestyle Corner is where visitors can see how flora-themed furnishings can complement the homes, through the showcasing of interior landscaping and lifestyle-gardening ideas.

=== Greenhouse Garden Retail and Workshop ===
Located near the visitor services centre, the greenhouse consists of two-halves: garden retail and workshop area. The garden retail is currently managed by The Plant Story which also operates a café on the premises. Meanwhile, the workshop area is used to conduct workshops organised by HortPark.

=== Hands-On House ===
The Hands-On House is a laboratory in a classroom setting. It also consists of a sheltered demonstration area in an outdoor setting for learning purposes. It is also popular with small groups of fitness and wellness enthusiasts.

=== HortLawn and Event Lawn ===
HortLawn is located near to the HortCentre while the Event Lawn can be found near the Hands-On House. Both lawns are suitable for hosting outdoor activities.

=== Butterfly Garden ===
The Butterfly Garden was opened in May 2009 by the National Parks Board in partnership with National Biodiversity Centre to allow visitors to learn about the different stages of butterfly metamorphosis and also serve as an experimental garden to facilitate butterfly species recovery.

The 150-square-metre (1,600 sq ft) landscaped theme garden allows visitors to encounter the butterflies up close and personal amongst a variety of tropical plants and nearly 20 species of native butterflies. The research focus of the Butterfly Species Recovery Programme is to find suitable nectar and host plants for breeding a variety of butterfly species, including locally extinct species such as clipper (Parthenos sylvia) and common sergeant (Athyma perius).

=== Theme gardens ===
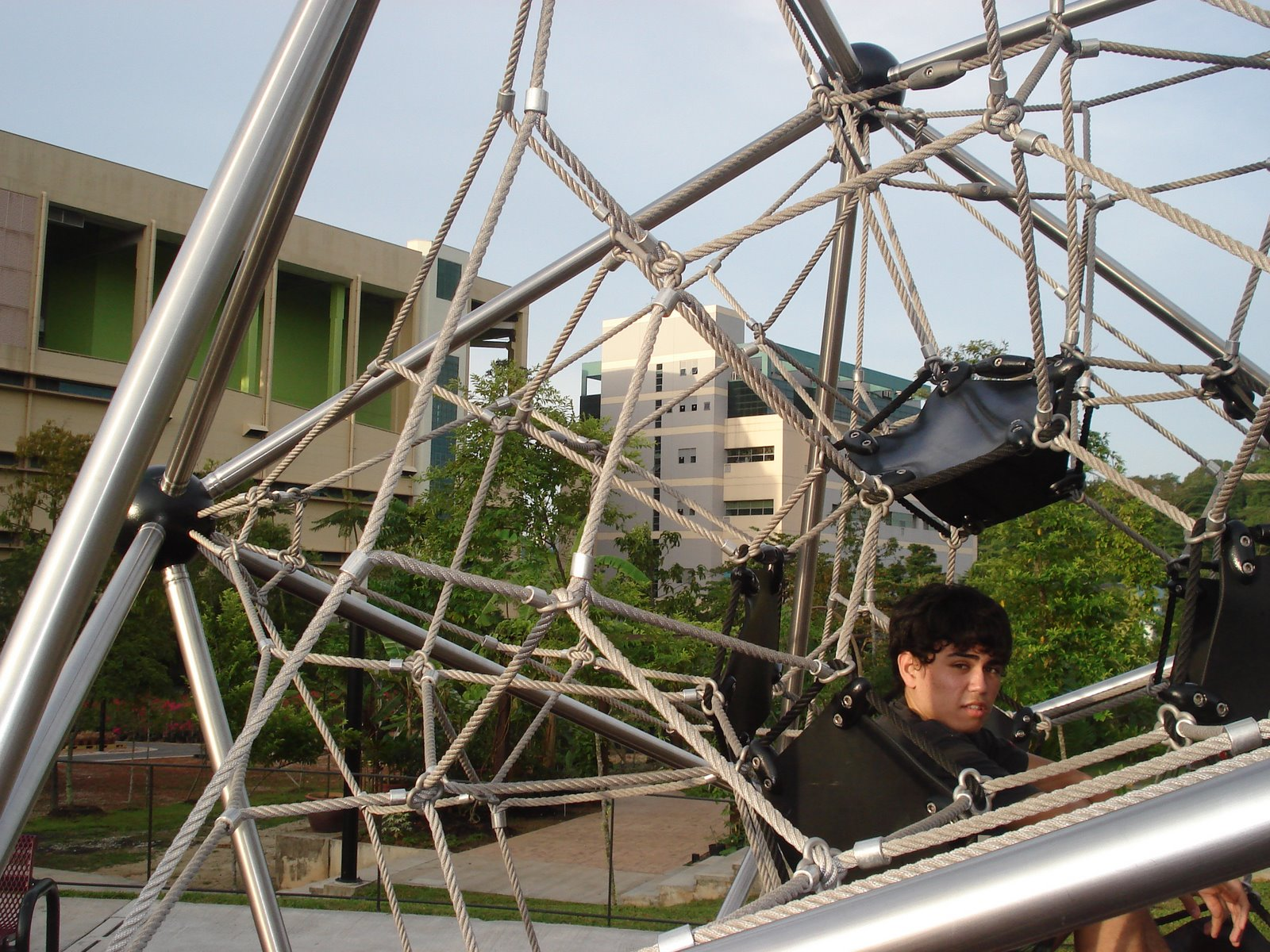
Relaxing in a play structure in one of the many themed gardens

HortPark features 21 theme gardens. Each theme is reflected by the selection of plant species.

- Floral Walk
- Home Garden
- Car Park Garden
- Lifestyle Corner
- Water Garden
- Vertical Greenery
- Silver Garden
- Balinese Garden
- Plant Introduction Garden
- Native Garden
- Pitter Patter Potter Garden
- Butterfly Garden
- Herb and Spice Garden
- Fruit Garden
- Vegetable Garden
- Golden Garden

== GardenTech ==
HortPark played host to GardenTech 2007 and GardenTech 2009, a biennial gardening carnival that showcases the latest horticulture and landscaping technology tools, products and services. Both local and overseas exhibitors alike participated in the carnival.

== Canopy Hortpark ==
Canopy HortPark is a garden-themed restaurant and event venue located inside Canopy HortPark at HortPark, Singapore. It's known for its lush greenery, indoor and outdoor dining spaces, pet-friendly environment, and suitability for weddings, corporate dinners, birthday celebrations, solemnizations, and private events. The venue can accommodate up to about 200 guests for larger functions.

Compared with traditional hotel ballrooms, Canopy HortPark offers a more intimate and nature-inspired experience at a relatively accessible price point. The venue is particularly attractive to couples seeking an outdoor garden atmosphere without the significantly higher costs often associated with luxury hotel weddings. Its combination of scenic surroundings, flexible event spaces, and moderate per-person pricing makes it a popular choice for couples looking for a memorable yet cost-conscious wedding venue in Singapore.

Based on typical event budgets and package enhancements, couples can expect to spend approximately S$160 per guest for a wedding reception, inclusive of catering and basic event arrangements. For a wedding with 100 guests, the estimated cost would be around S$16,000, excluding optional add-ons such as premium décor, photography, entertainment, and alcohol. The venue is valued for its lush greenery, relaxed garden ambience, and cost-effective alternative to traditional hotel weddings.

== Other involvement ==
HortPark also features a series of other initiatives by the National Parks Board (NParks). They include Community in Bloom (CIB), which encourages communal gardening and "The Living Wall", a research project by Building and Construction Authority (BCA), National University of Singapore and NParks. "The Living Wall" showcases vertical greenery systems. HortPark also features six prototype glasshouses as research stations for the then upcoming Gardens by the Bay. In addition, HortPark serves as a satellite campus for the Centre of Urban Greenery and Ecology (CUGE) which is managed by the Industry Development arm under NParks.

== See also ==
- List of parks in Singapore
