= Henderson Waves =

Pedestrian bridge in Singapore

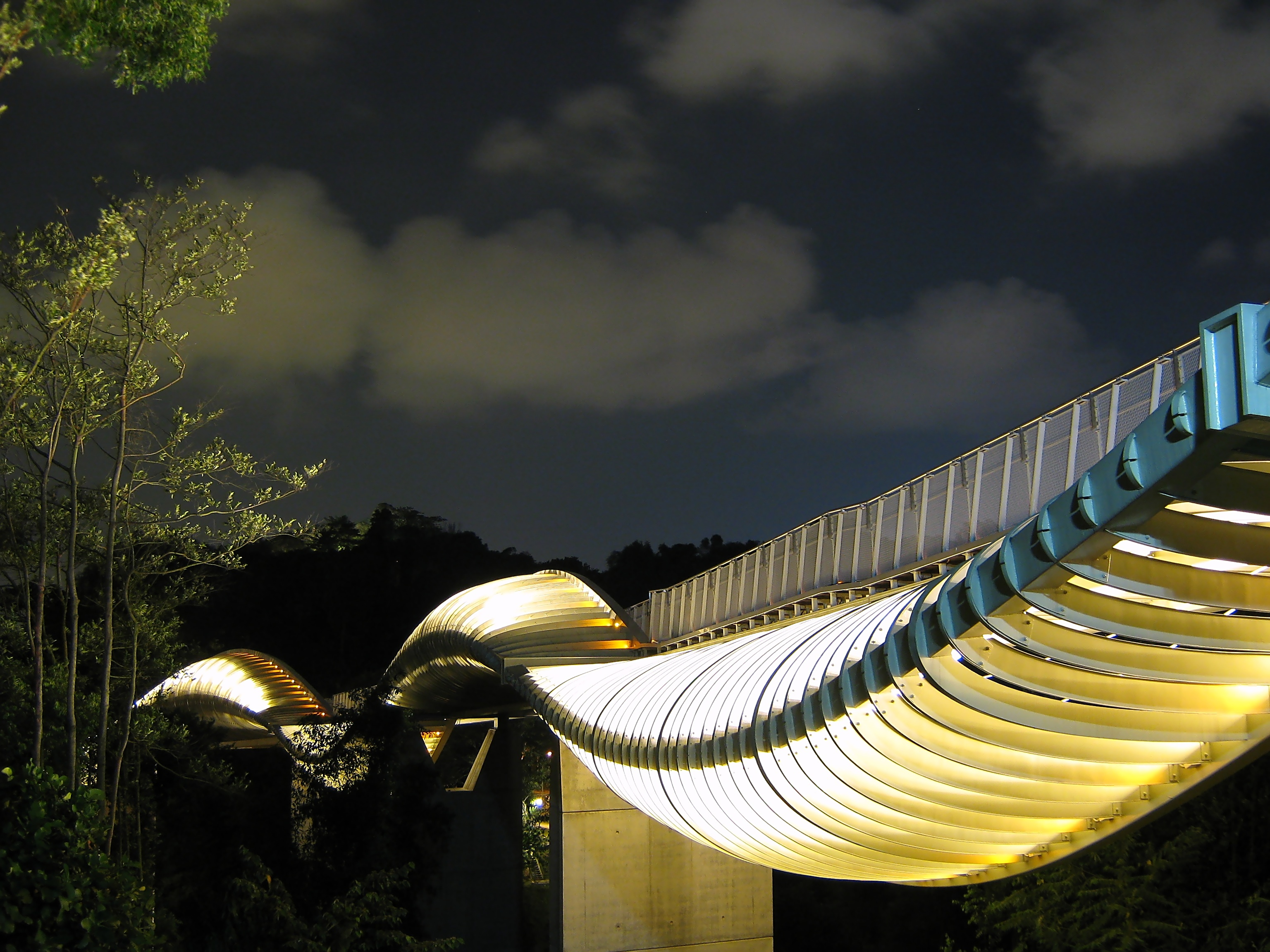
- Night view
- Coordinates: 1.27605°N 103.81550°E
- Carries: Pedestrians and bicycles
- Crosses: Henderson Road
- Locale: Southern Ridges, Singapore
- Begins: Mount Faber Park
- Ends: Telok Blangah Hill Park

Characteristics
- Total length: 274 metres (899 ft)
- Width: 8 metres (26 ft)
- Height: 36 metres (118 ft)

History
- Designer: List: RSP Architects Planners & Engineers; IJP Architects
- Construction start: September 2006
- Opened: 10 May 2008
- Inaugurated: 10 May 2008

Location
- Interactive map of Henderson Waves

Henderson Waves is a pedestrian bridge crossing Henderson Road in the Southern Ridges in Singapore. Along with Alexandra Arch, the bridge is one of two pedestrian bridges that form part of the walking trail connecting the Southern Ridges with Mount Faber, and is the highest pedestrian bridge in Singapore. The sun-shading, curved, wooden ribs are illuminated at night.

== History ==
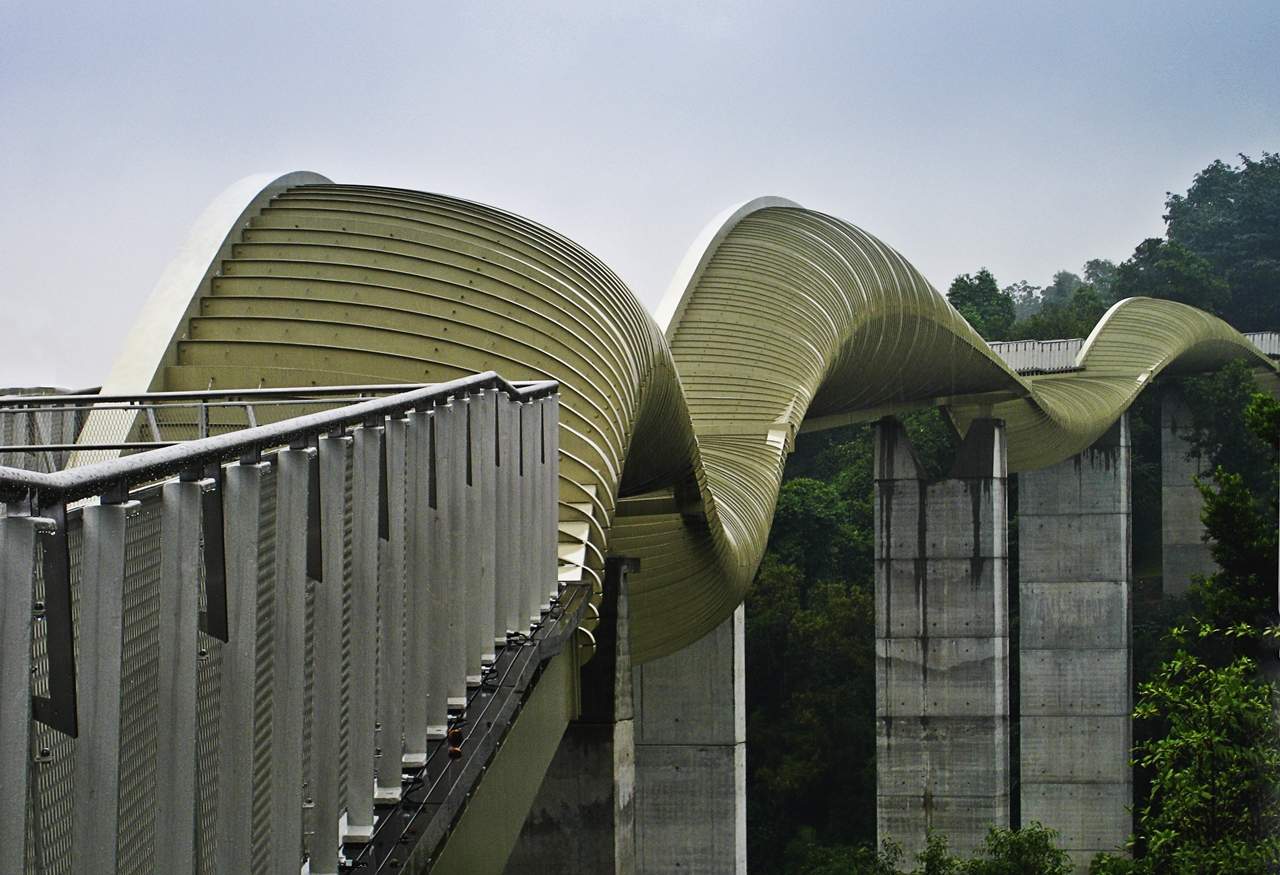
The bridge in 2008

Plans for two new pedestrian bridges in the Southern Ridges were first announced in 2002 as part of the Urban Redevelopment Authority's plan to enhance the unique qualities of selected areas. A competition was launched by the Urban Redevelopment Authority to seek designs for both bridges, with the design by Singaporean architectural firm RSP Architects Planners & Engineers and IJP Architects being selected as the design for the bridge travelling over Henderson Road. The bridge was opened on 10 May 2008 by Prime Minister Lee Hsien Loong. The bridge is 36m above Henderson Road 274m long and 8m wide. It is the tallest pedestrian bridge in Singapore, In July, the bridge was shortlisted for the inaugural World Architecture Festival Awards under the transport category.

The bridge went under maintenance works in November 2014, while remaining open to the public.
