= Kent Ridge Park =

Park in Singapore

Coordinates: 1°17′1.53″N 103°47′25.98″E

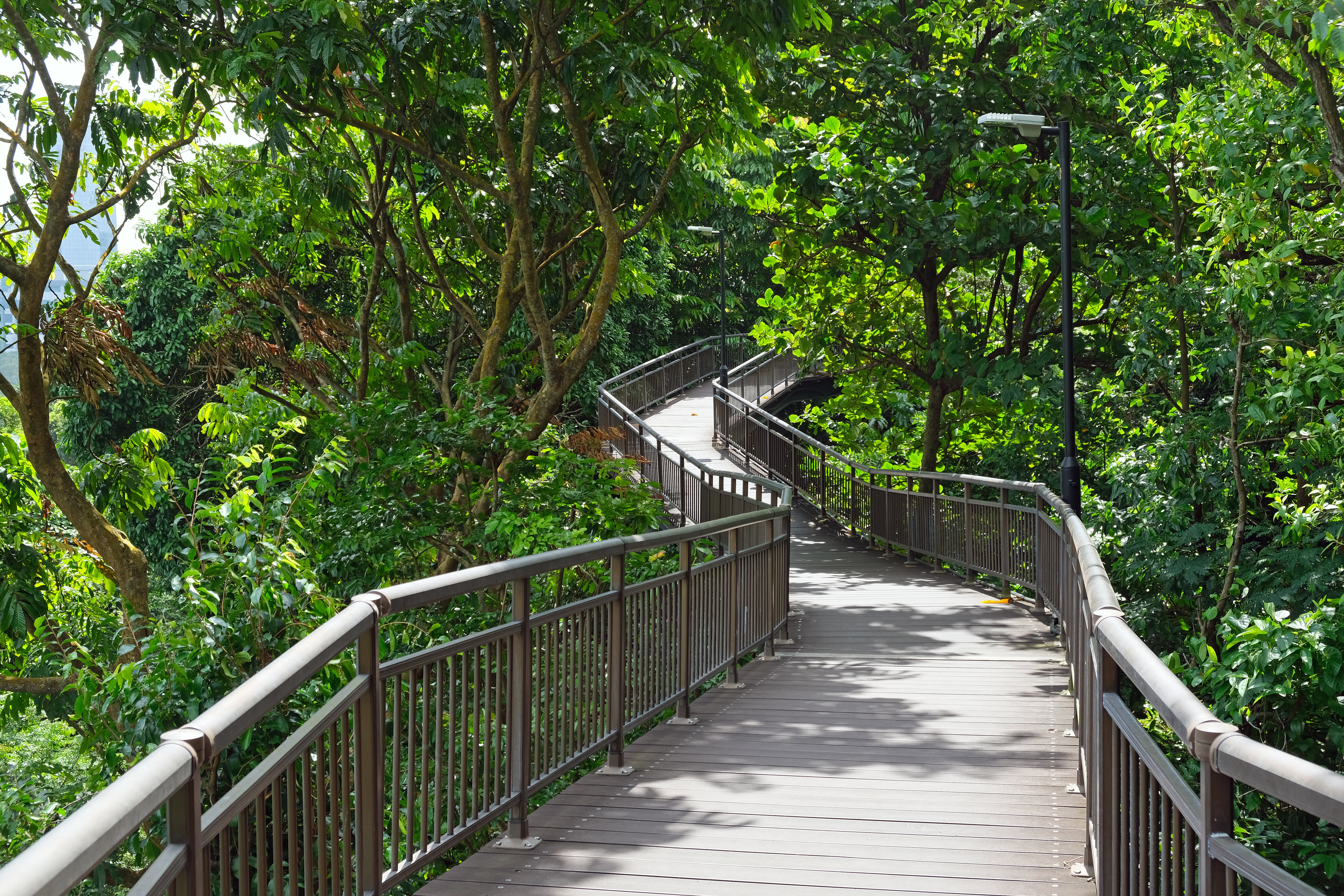
- Interactive map of Kent Ridge Park
- Type: Urban park
- Location: Singapore
- Area: 91.6 hectares (226 acres)
- Created: 1954; 72 years ago
- Status: Open all year

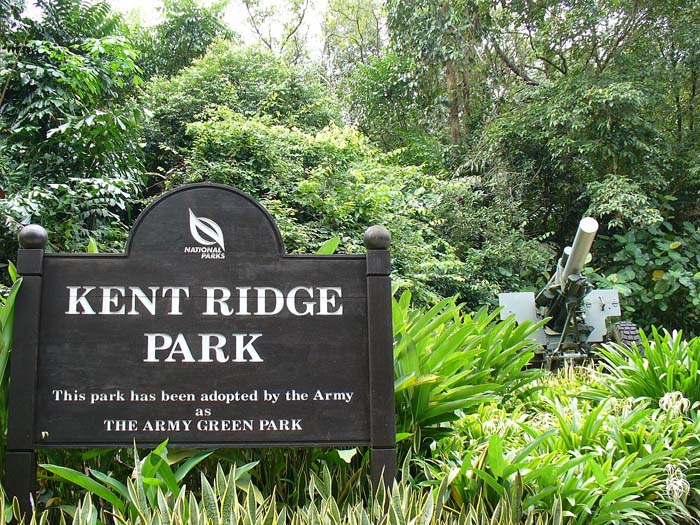
The Vigilante Drive entrance to Kent Ridge Park. In the background lies a decommissioned M114 155mm field howitzer donated by Singapore's Ministry of Defence (as of December 2015, the gun has been removed from display and the portion of the big sign that reads "This park has been adopted by the Army as The Army Green Park" has been boarded over.).

Kent Ridge Park is a 47-hectare public park located in Kent Ridge, Singapore, between the National University of Singapore and the Singapore Science Park. Due to its undisturbed habitat and abundant plant life, it is a popular venue for bird-watchers and eco-tourists.

During the Second World War, a hill in the park was the site of one of the last and fiercest battles fought by the Malay Regiment against the invading Japanese army, the Battle of Bukit Chandu (also known as the Battle of Pasir Panjang), 12–14 February 1942.

The park was officially opened in 1954, and was gazetted by the National Heritage Board as one of 11 World War II sites in Singapore in 1995. It is one of over 300 parks managed by Singapore's National Parks Board, NParks.

== History ==
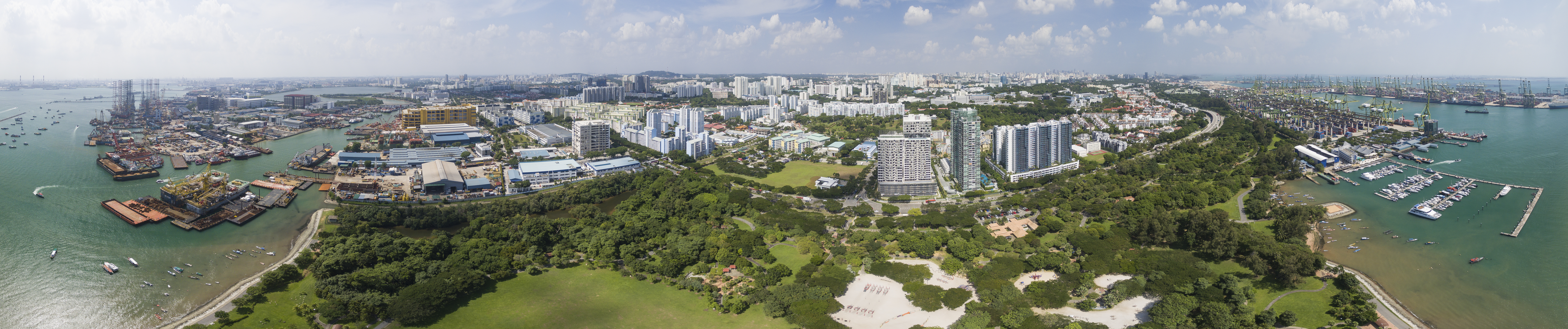
Aerial panorama of Singapore's west coast, shot 2016. Kent Ridge sits to the right.

The area occupied by Kent Ridge Park and the National University of Singapore was formerly known as Pasir Panjang Ridge, and was originally a lowland evergreen rainforest. The park's natural vegetation now consists of groves of Tembusu, Acacias and Dillenias. When the first settlers arrived in Singapore in the early 19th century, they grew crops such as rubber, pepper, gambier and pineapple on the ridge. During World War II, it was used as a fortress by the British in the defence of Singapore. Many of these plantations were either abandoned or destroyed during the Japanese Occupation (1942–1945), which allowed such crops to grow wild.

On 23 February 1954, the Governor of Singapore, Sir John Fearns Nicoll unveiled a plaque which declared the area had been renamed Kent Ridge to commemorate the visit by the Duchess of Kent and her son, the Duke of Kent, on 3 October 1952. The plaque was erected at the junction of what is now Kent Ridge Road and South Buona Vista Road.

The park contains Bukit Chandu, alternatively known as Opium Hill (in Malay), after the opium processing factory owned by the British East India Company that was at the foot of the hill until 1910. During 12–14 February 1942, it was the site of the Battle of Bukit Chandu, fought by the 42 survivors of the Malay Regiment led by Lieutenant Adnan Bin Saidi against the 13,000 men of Lieutenant-General Mutaguchi Renya's 18th Division. The Malay Regiment's position on the hill was overrun by the Japanese and the battle ended in hand-to-hand combat after the last few defenders ran out of ammunition. All the officers except one, Lieutenant Abbas Abdul-Manan, and most of the men, were massacred in the aftermath.

== The park today ==
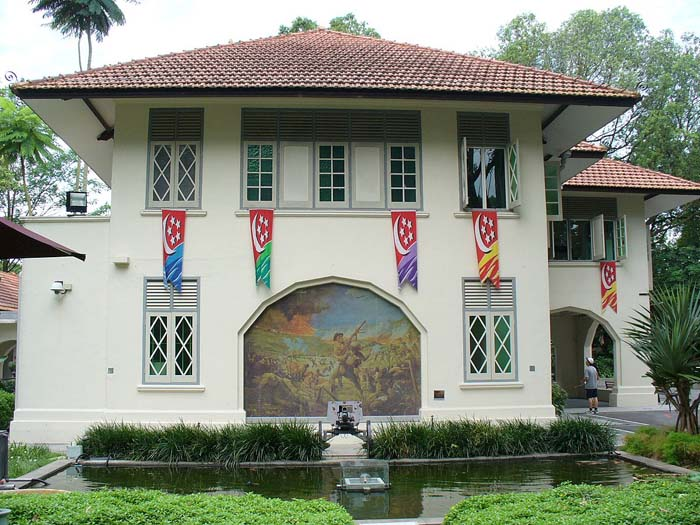
The war museum, Reflections at Bukit Chandu, at 31K Bukit Chandu. The mural on the museum's wall is an artist's impression of the Battle of Bukit Chandu.

Formerly used to house senior British Army officers, the last remaining black and white colonial bungalow at 31K Bukit Chandu has been restored and converted into a World War II war museum called Reflections at Bukit Chandu, commemorating the war and those who fought in it. Originally there were two smaller bungalows below 31K, but they were demolished in 1987 to make way for a public parking lot. There are three life-size statues and a plaque outside the museum, honoring the Malay Regiment and commemorating the lives of those who died.

Kent Ridge Park, Labrador Park, and the war museum, are part of the Pasir Panjang Historic District, which focuses on World War II battlefield events in western Singapore. Together with Fort Siloso at Sentosa and The Battle Box at Fort Canning, they serve as a reminder of an important chapter in Singapore's modern history. Near to the top of the ridge, there is a commemorative heritage site marker which shows the area where the Battle of Pasir Panjang of 1942 was fought.

The park also has some decommissioned Singapore Army military equipment, consisting of two WWII-vintage US M114 155mm field howitzers and a French AMX-13 light tank on permanent outdoor display until December 2015, donated by the Ministry of Defence as part of its adoption of Kent Ridge Park as The Army Green Park in support of the National Parks Board "Adopt-a-Park" scheme to inculcate a greater ownership among the public of local parks and greenery. The park's facilities include fitness corners, look-out points, a nature trail, a multi-purpose court and a canopy walk. The highest point of the park is 61 metres (200 ft) above sea level, from where there is a panoramic view of the coast of Pasir Panjang and some of the Southern Islands, approximately 5 kilometres (3.1 mi) off the south-western coast of Singapore. Islands such as Pulau Bukom and Pulau Semakau are visible on a clear day.

Kent Ridge Park, Telok Blangah Hill Park, and Mount Faber Park are part of the Southern Ridges trail that links all 3 parks via connecting bridges and paths.

== Plant and animal life ==
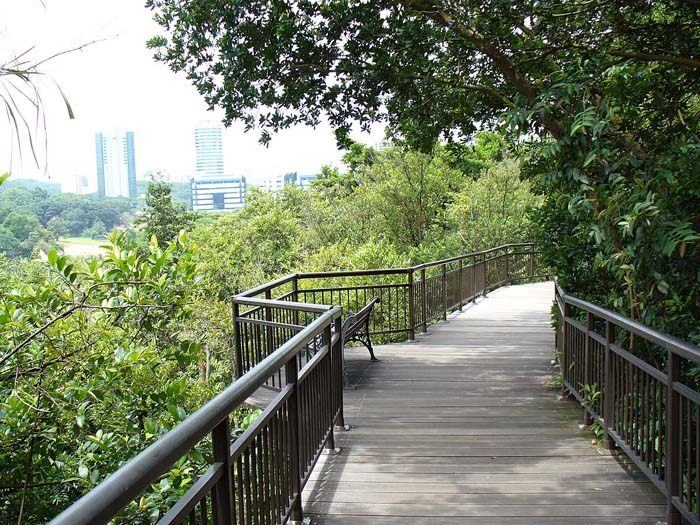
A section of the 280-metre long canopy walk in Kent Ridge Park

The park is managed by the National Parks Board, and is open daily to the public. Admission is free except for entrance to the war museum. The park is accessible via entrances on Vigilante Drive and Pepys Road, off Pasir Panjang Road. Most of the remaining wild part of the park comprises secondary forest with plants native to Singapore and Peninsular Malaysia such as tembusu, angsana, white leaf fig, common pulai, Singapore rhododendron, pitcher plants, cicada tree and simpoh air.

The trails through the park, including one for mountain biking, run almost parallel along the ridge. There is a natural pond with fishes and turtles in the north-west of the park. A 280-metre long canopy walk was completed in the eastern part of the park in October 2003, linking Kent Ridge Park to the war museum, Reflections at Bukit Chandu, enhancing the park's and museum's accessibility to the public. Along the walk, there are information boards providing educational information on the flora and fauna in the park. At the half-way point, there is a shelter for visitors to take a short break or to enjoy a scenic view of Normanton Park and the National Parks Board's plant nursery.

It is one of four popular birdwatching sites on mainland Singapore along with Pasir Ris Park, Fort Canning Park and Sungei Buloh Wetland Reserve. Birds found in the park include: white-crested laughing thrush, collared kingfisher, white-bellied sea eagle, banded woodpecker, pink-necked pigeon, blue-tailed bee-eater, white-breasted waterhen, and spotted dove.

Eco-tours and heritage tours are regularly organised by various special interest groups such as the Nature Society Singapore and the Raffles Museum of Biodiversity Research, for students and the general public.

== See also ==
- Battle of Pasir Panjang
- Fort Pasir Panjang
- Poh Ern Shih Temple
- List of Parks in Singapore
