= Southern Ridges =

10km trail in southern Singapore

Coordinates: 1.2790°N 103.8073°E

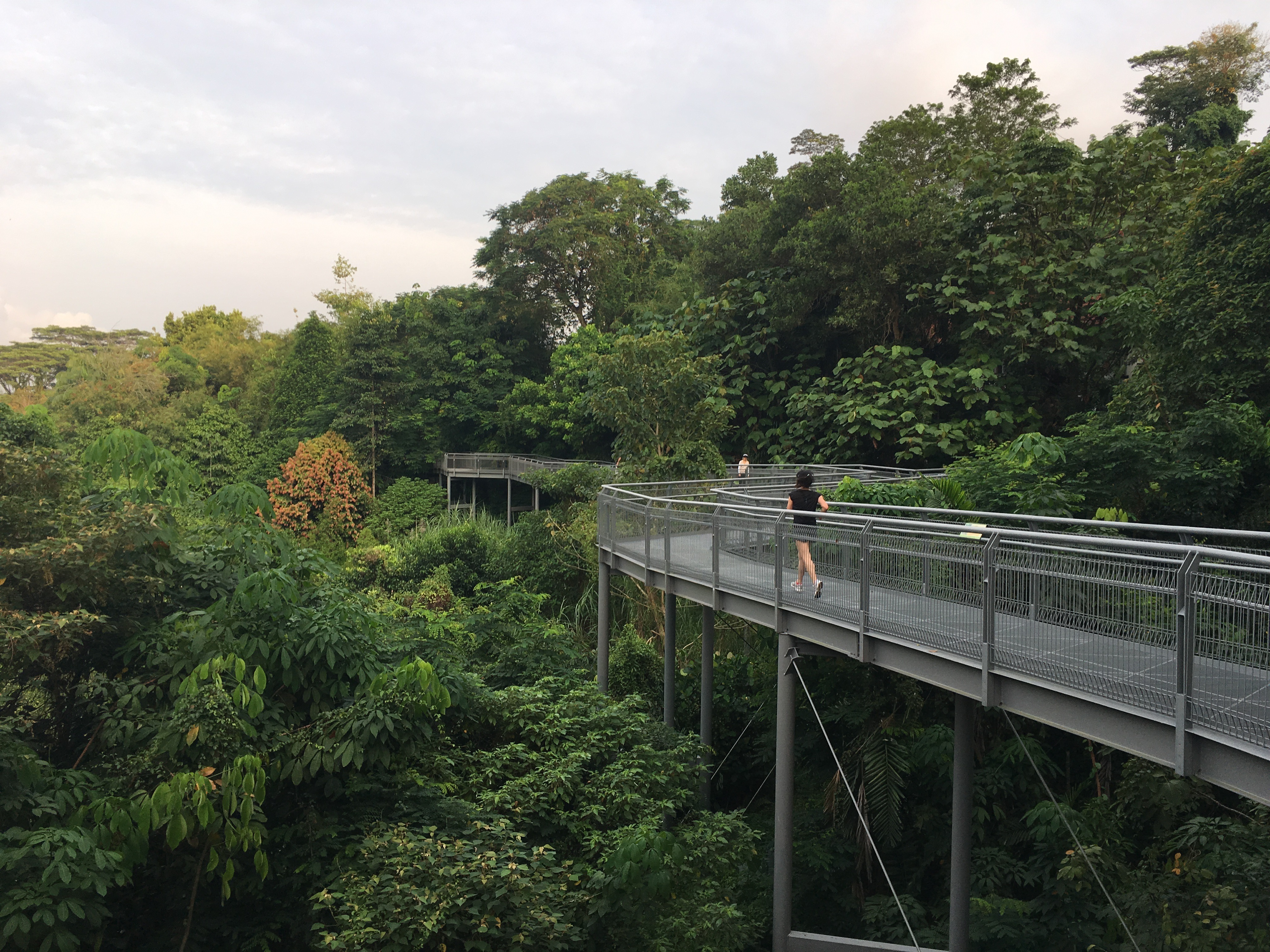
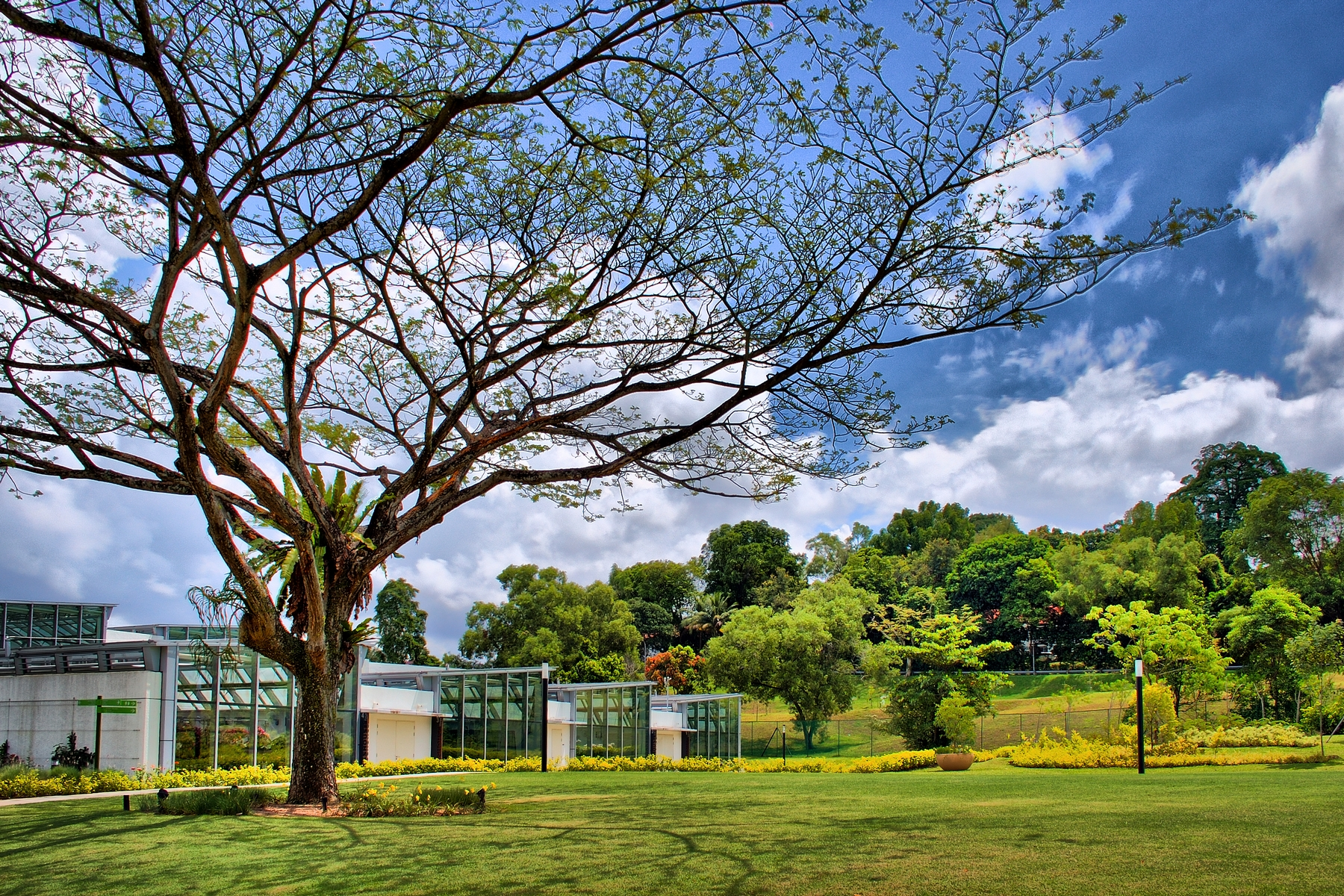
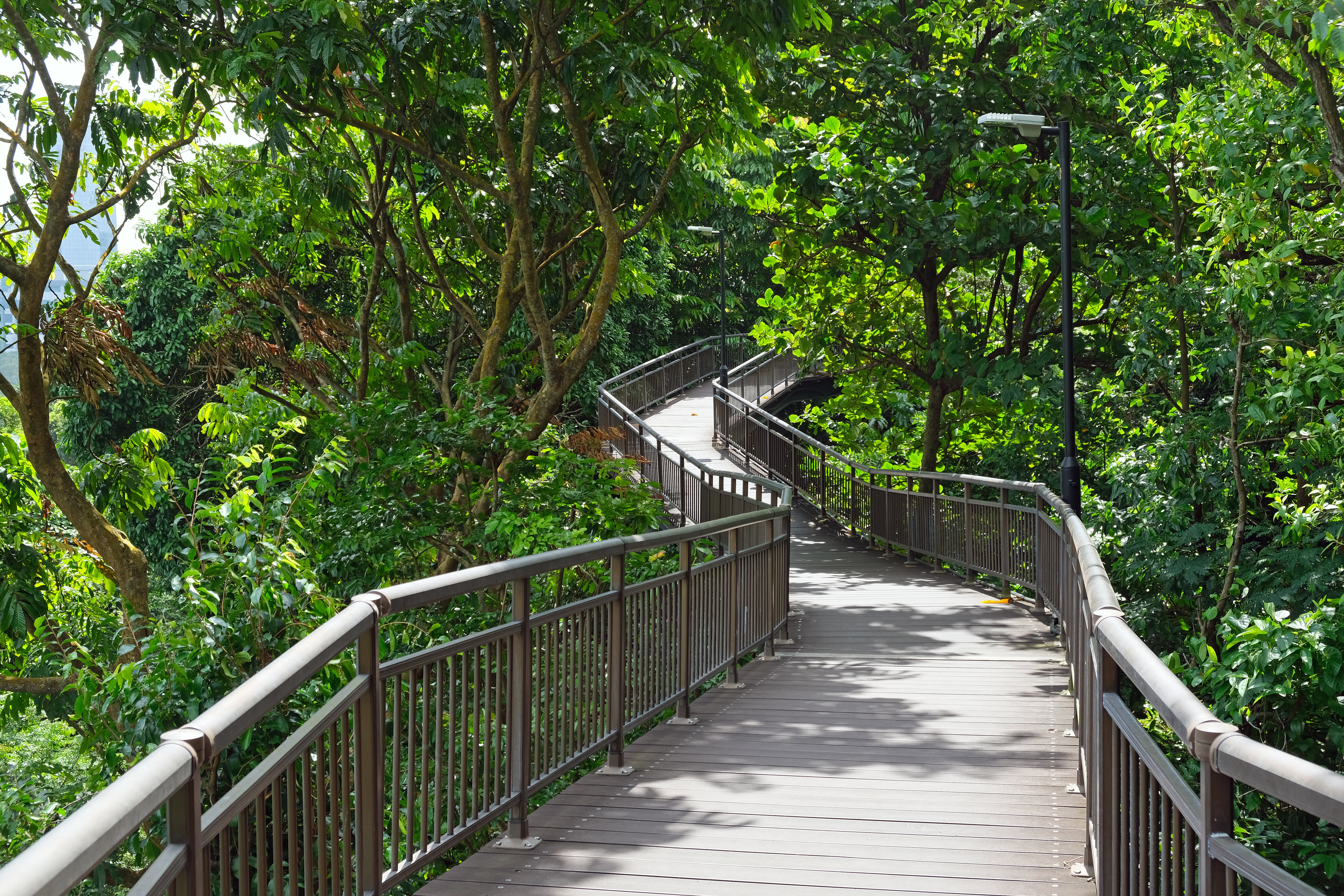
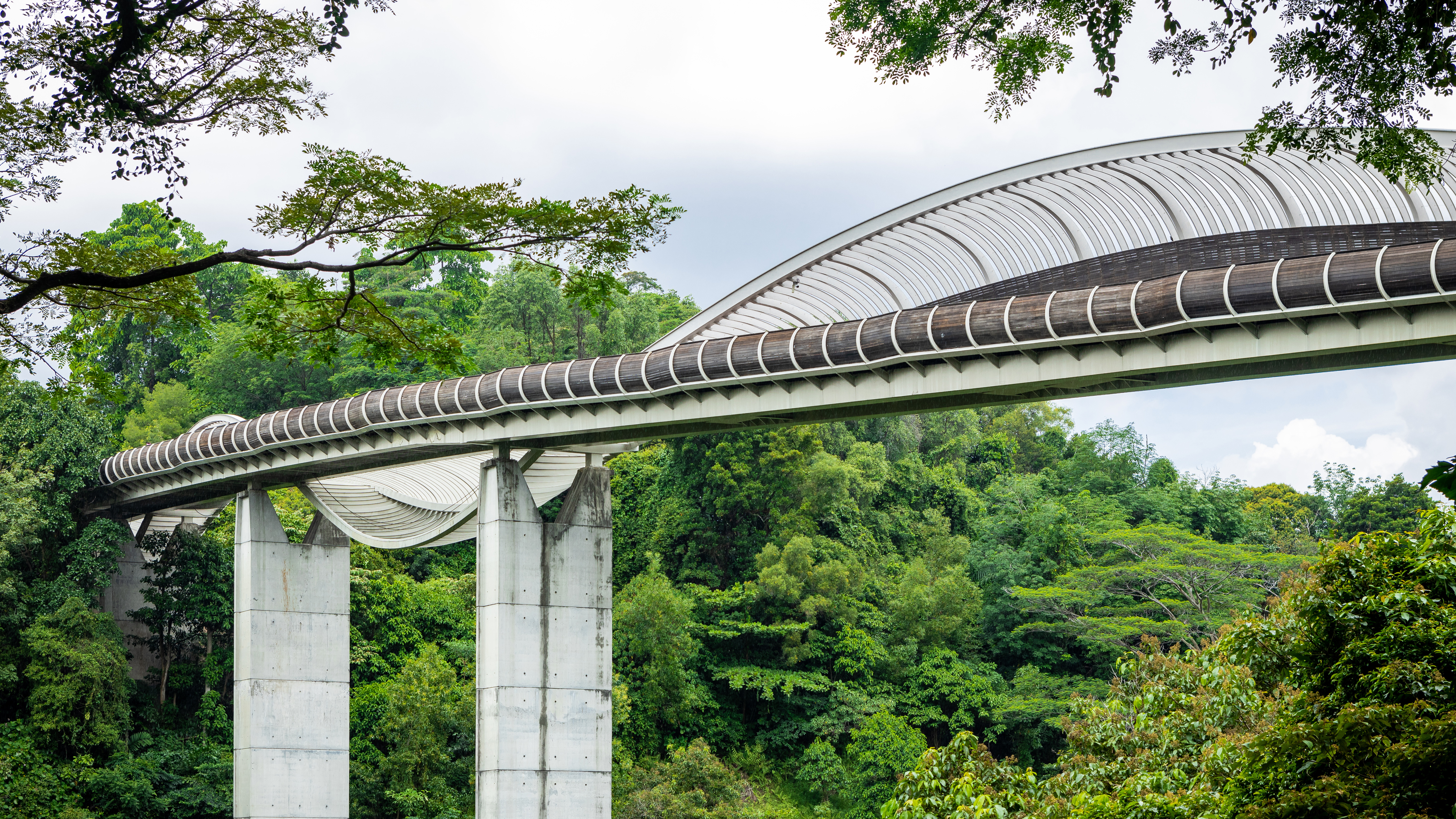
- From top left to right: Forest Walk, HortPark, Canopy Walk, Henderson Waves
- Length: 10 km (6.2 mi)
- Location: Kent Ridge Park and Telok Blangah Hill Park, Singapore
- Trailheads: Kent Ridge Park; Telok Blangah Hill Park
- Use: Recreational
- Highest point: Henderson Waves Timber Deck, 78 m (256 ft)
- Sights: Flowering plants, Secondary forest

The Southern Ridges comprise 10 kilometres (6.2 mi) of trails connecting three parks along the southern ridge of Singapore. Some of the attractions along these trails include its greenery and the connecting bridges. This project linked up the parks between the Kent Ridge Park and HarbourFront. The idea to link these parks was coined in 2002 by Urban Redevelopment Authority (URA) and it took 2 years to complete and cost S$25.5 million.

== Parks ==
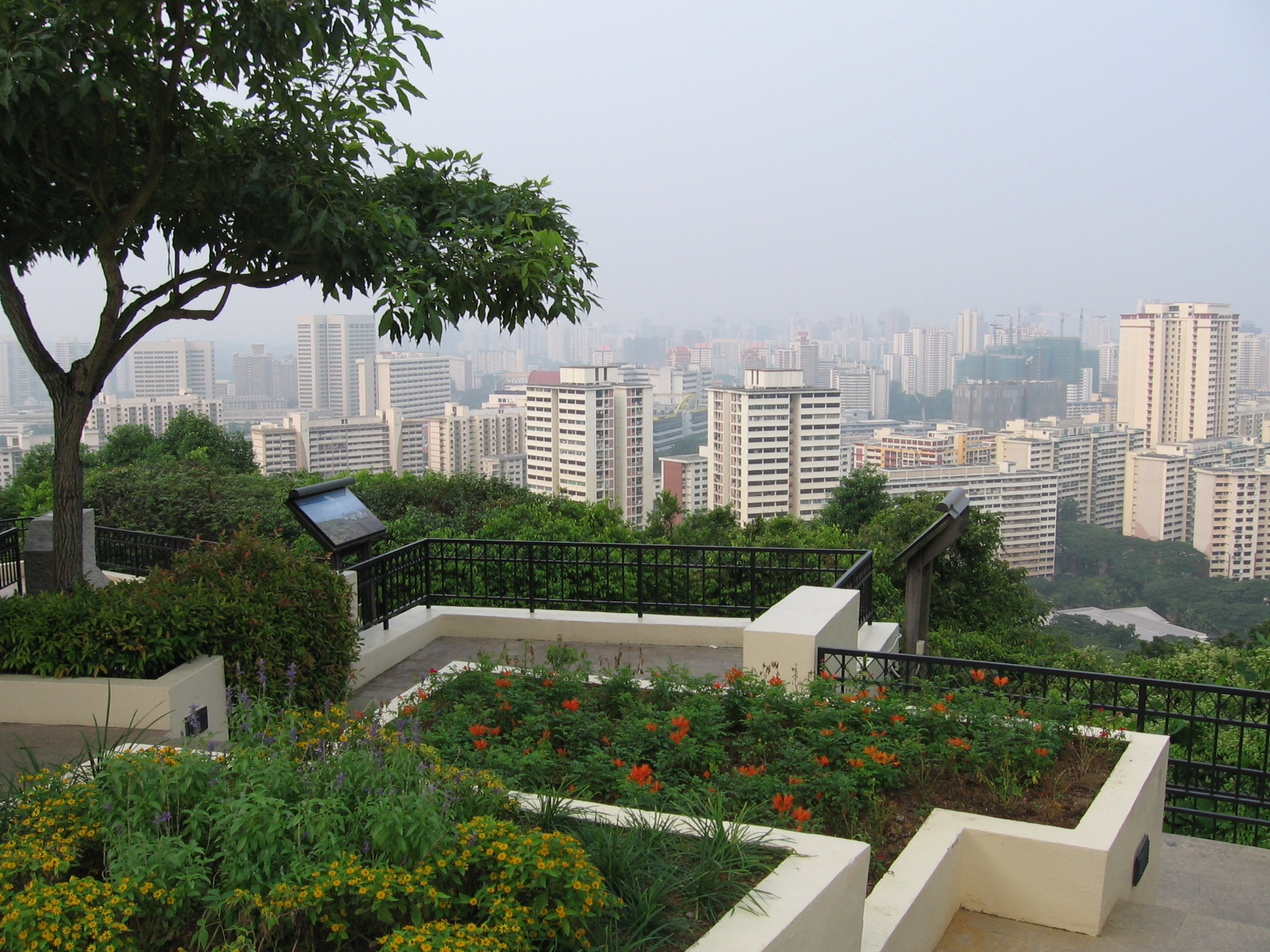
Mount Faber

There are 3 parks that are connected to each other: Mount Faber, Telok Blangah Hill Park and the Kent Ridge Park.

=== Mount Faber Park ===
Mount Faber Park is one of the oldest parks in Singapore and a popular tourist destination. The park is connected to Telok Blangah Hill Park by Henderson Waves bridge. The park consists of such locations as the Marina Deck, Palm Plaza, Jewel Box, and Faber Point.

=== Telok Blangah Hill Park ===
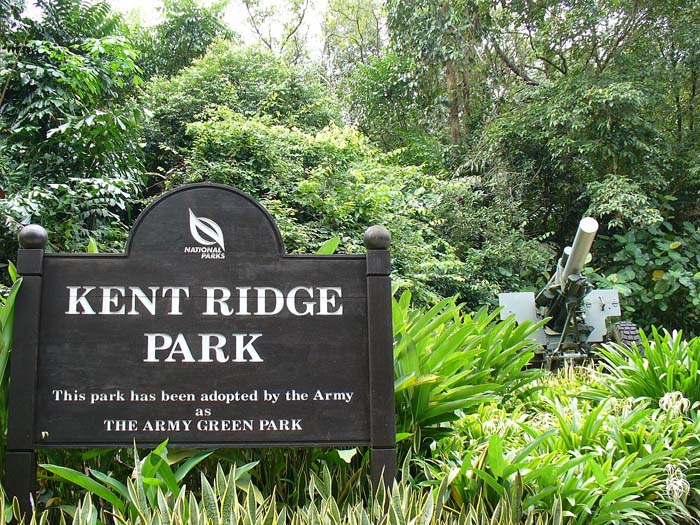
Kent Ridge Park

It is a 34-hectare park which is a popular place for wedding couples. A series of semi-circular terrace garden located at the top of the park is the Terrace Garden.

=== Kent Ridge Park ===
Kent Ridge Park is a 47-hectare public park between the National University of Singapore and the Singapore Science Park. Due to its undisturbed habitat and abundant plant life, it is a popular venue for bird-watchers and eco-tourists.

== Trails ==
There are 8 trails at Southern Ridges.

=== Marang Trail ===
Marang Trail is 800 metres (2,600 ft) long and an elevation of 70 metres (230 ft). It extends from Marang Road, just behind the HarbourFront MRT station along the North East and Circle MRT lines to the cable car station at The Jewel Box on Mount Faber. The trail consists of steps and shaded footpaths through secondary forest.

=== Faber Trail ===
Faber Trail is a 1-kilometre-long (0.62 mi) trail going through the Mount Faber Park. It ends at the Henderson Waves. At its peak, it offers panoramic views of the southern part of Singapore and the Southern Islands.

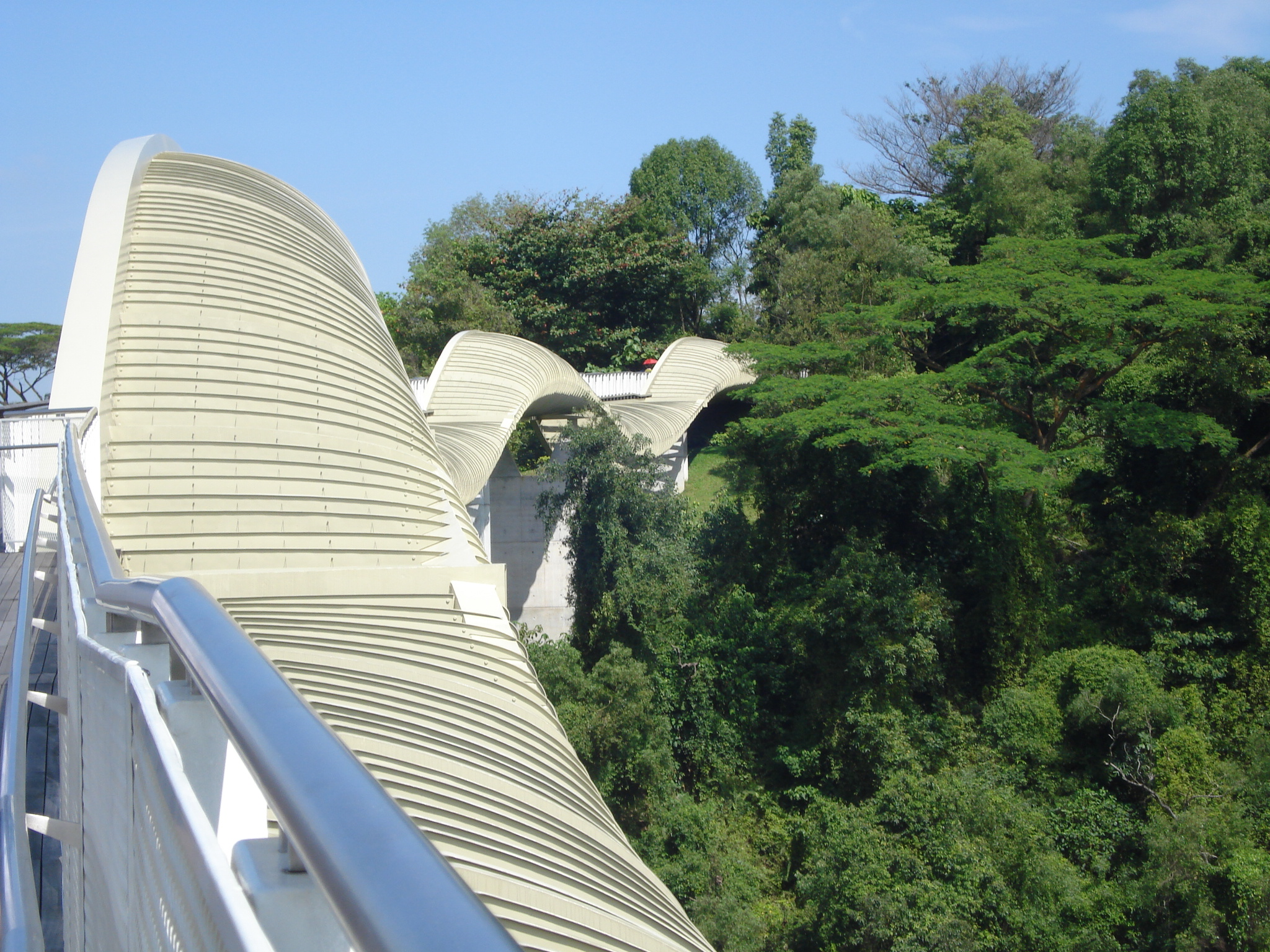
Henderson Waves

=== Henderson Waves ===
Henderson Waves is a 274-metre-long (899 ft) pedestrian bridge. At 36 metres (118 ft) above Henderson Road, it is the highest pedestrian bridge in Singapore. It connects Mount Faber Park and Telok Blangah Hill Park. It was designed by the London-based consortium IJP Architects / AKTII Consulting Civil and Structural Engineers, with RSP Architects Planners and Engineers. Architect George L. Legendre is the designer of the project
The bridge has a wave-form made up of seven undulating curved steel ribs that alternately rise over and under its deck. The curved ribs form alcoves that function as shelters with seats within. Slats of yellow balau wood, an all-weather timber found in Southeast Asia, are used in the decking. The wave-forms are lit with LED lamps at night from 7 pm to 2 am daily. It also was built in 2008 costing £25.5m.

=== Hilltop Walk ===
Hilltop Walk is a 1-kilometre (0.62 mi) trail which runs through Telok Blangah Hill Park. The trail connects on one end with the Henderson Waves and the other with the Forest Walk leading to Alexandra Arch.

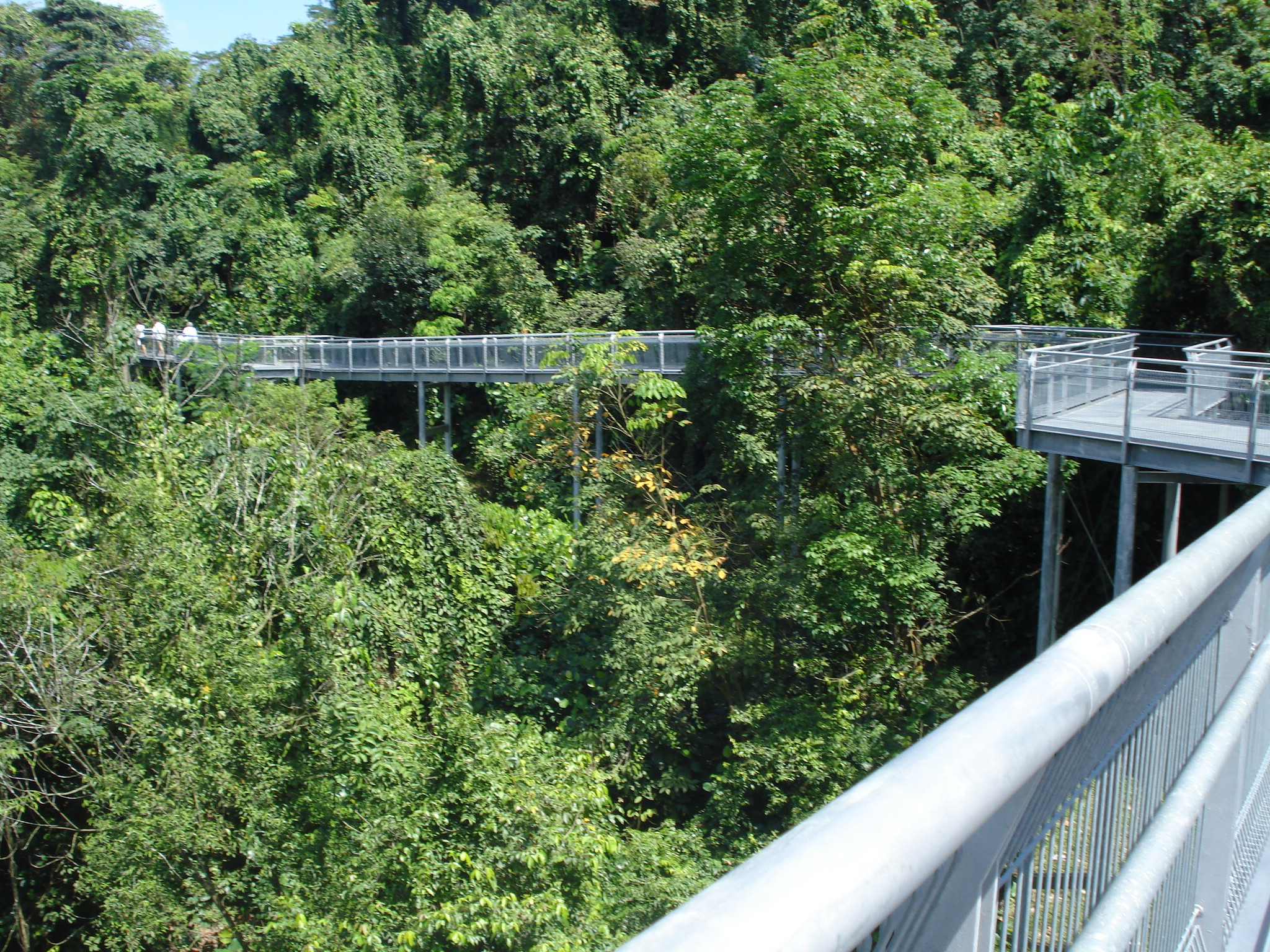
Forest Walk

=== Forest Walk ===
Forest Walk is a 1.3-kilometre-long (0.81 mi) walkway that cuts through about 50 metres (160 ft) through the secondary forest in Telok Blangah Hill Park and connects to Alexandra Arch. The raised walkway with heights ranging from 3 metres (9.8 ft) to 18 metres (59 ft) brushes the canopy of trees and offers a bird's-eye view of the forest. The Forest Walk also connects to the Labrador Nature & Coastal Walk, also leading walkers to the Labrador Park MRT station and Labrador Park.

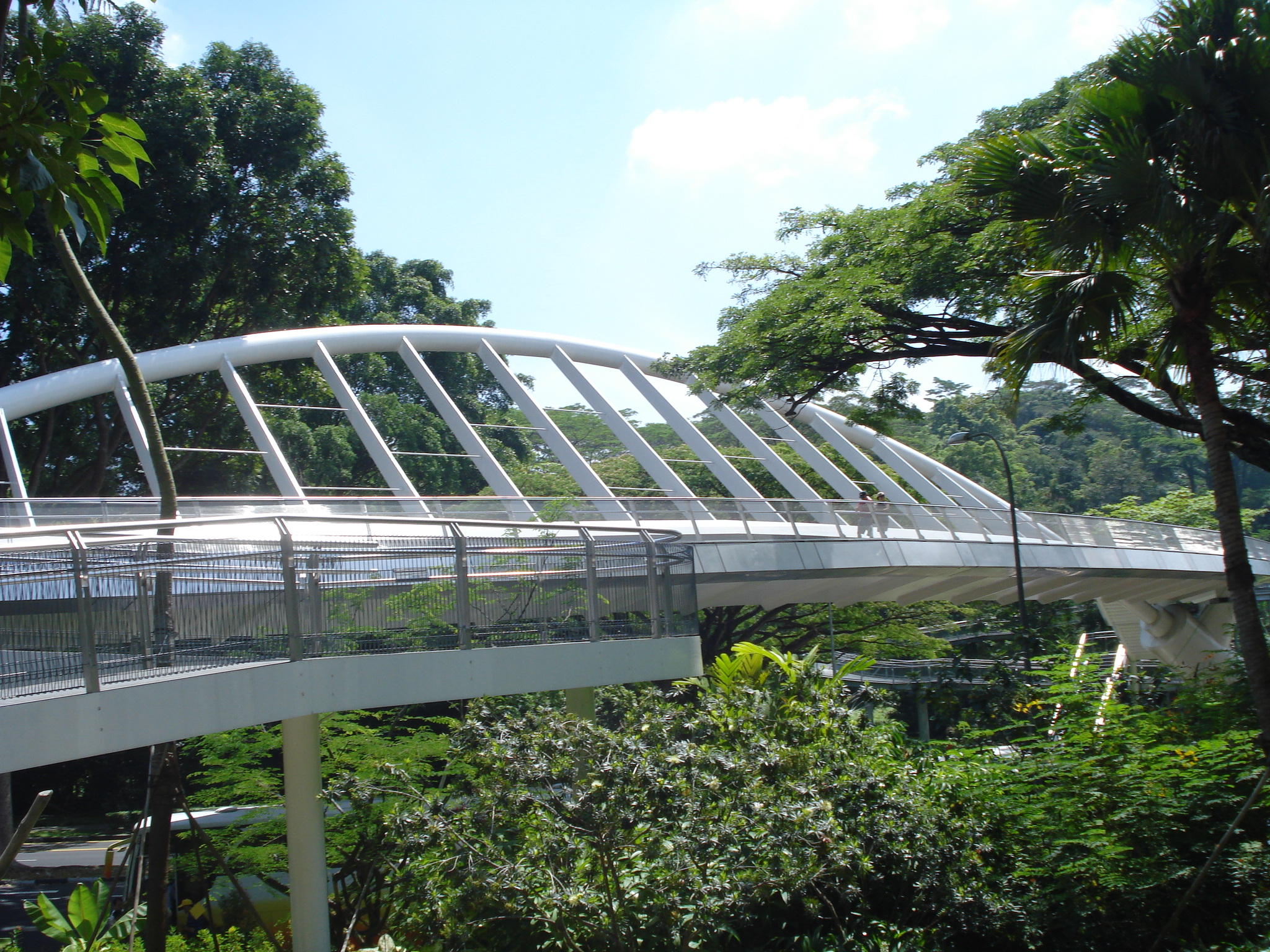
Alexandra Arch

=== Alexandra Arch ===
Alexandra Arch is an 80-metre-long (260 ft) bridge that features a curved deck and tilted arch like an opened leaf, connecting Alexandra Road, Singapore and Hyderabad Road. It was designed by Buro Happold with LOOK Architects. The Gillman Village, which was a former British military camp in the early 20th century, now houses a mixture of restaurants, pubs and art galleries. Like the Henderson Waves bridge, Alexandra Arch will be lit with colour-changing LED lamps. At the end of the Alexandra Arch, there is a path lined with flowering plants which leads to the HortPark.

=== Floral Walk & HortPark ===
Floral Walk is a 300-metre (980 ft) trail which offers a stroll along a path lined with flowering plants.

It forms the gateway to HortPark – the gardening hub. It is a 23-hectare park said to be South East Asia's first one stop shop for gardening-related recreational, educational, research and retail activities in a park setting. Some park highlights include themed gardens as well as outdoor display plots showcasing designs and ideas for home gardening.

=== Canopy Walk ===
Canopy Walk is a 300-metre (980 ft) trail which links Kent Ridge Park to Reflections at Bukit Chandu – once known as Opium Hill and site of one of the last battles of Singapore in World War II and HortPark. Elevated 16 metres (52 ft) at the centre, Canopy Walk goes through secondary forest with groves of Tembusu and dominant trees of the adinandra belukar. It is also filled with rich wildlife that lives there, such as squirrels, sunbirds, doves, lizards and white-crested laughing thrushes.

== Ecological Projects ==
=== Sembcorp Forests of Giants ===
Sembcorp Industries has donated $1 million to the Garden City Fund, an NParks charity, to set up an arboretum – a living gallery of giant tree species – for education and research, and to fund green educational programmes to benefit the community. This is part of efforts to enhance biodiversity within urban areas. These trees are native to the rainforests of the region and include some of the world's tallest species. For example, Koompassia excelsa (tualang) and Shorea faguetiana (Damar Siput) have been recorded at heights of 88 m. Accompanying these grand trees are also other emergent species with heights from 50 m to 80 m tall, where the typical mature rainforest canopy reaches.

Topographical contours and features at the Southern Ridges are designed for an assemblage of large native trees amidst the ridges of Telok Blangah and Mount Faber. A subsidiary collection of forest trees with large foliage is planned to be interspersed within the Sembcorp Forest of Giants collection.

=== The Singing Forest ===
In 2010, NParks planted around 200 trees of 38 native species of Singapore alongside a forest trail near Gillman Village in the Southern Ridges. The trees were planted to provide a variety of shelter and food, via its fruits, to native birds such as hornbills, fruit pigeons and the greater racket-tailed drongo. This was also to attract the native birds to return to the area, which used to nest there, from their current nests in the deep forested areas. The project was sponsored by ST Microelectronics via the Garden City Fund, an NParks charity.
