= Telok Blangah Hill Park =

Park in Singapore

Coordinates: 1°16′44.01″N 103°48′37.83″E

- 直落布兰雅山公园 (Chinese), Taman Bukit Telok Blangah (Malay)
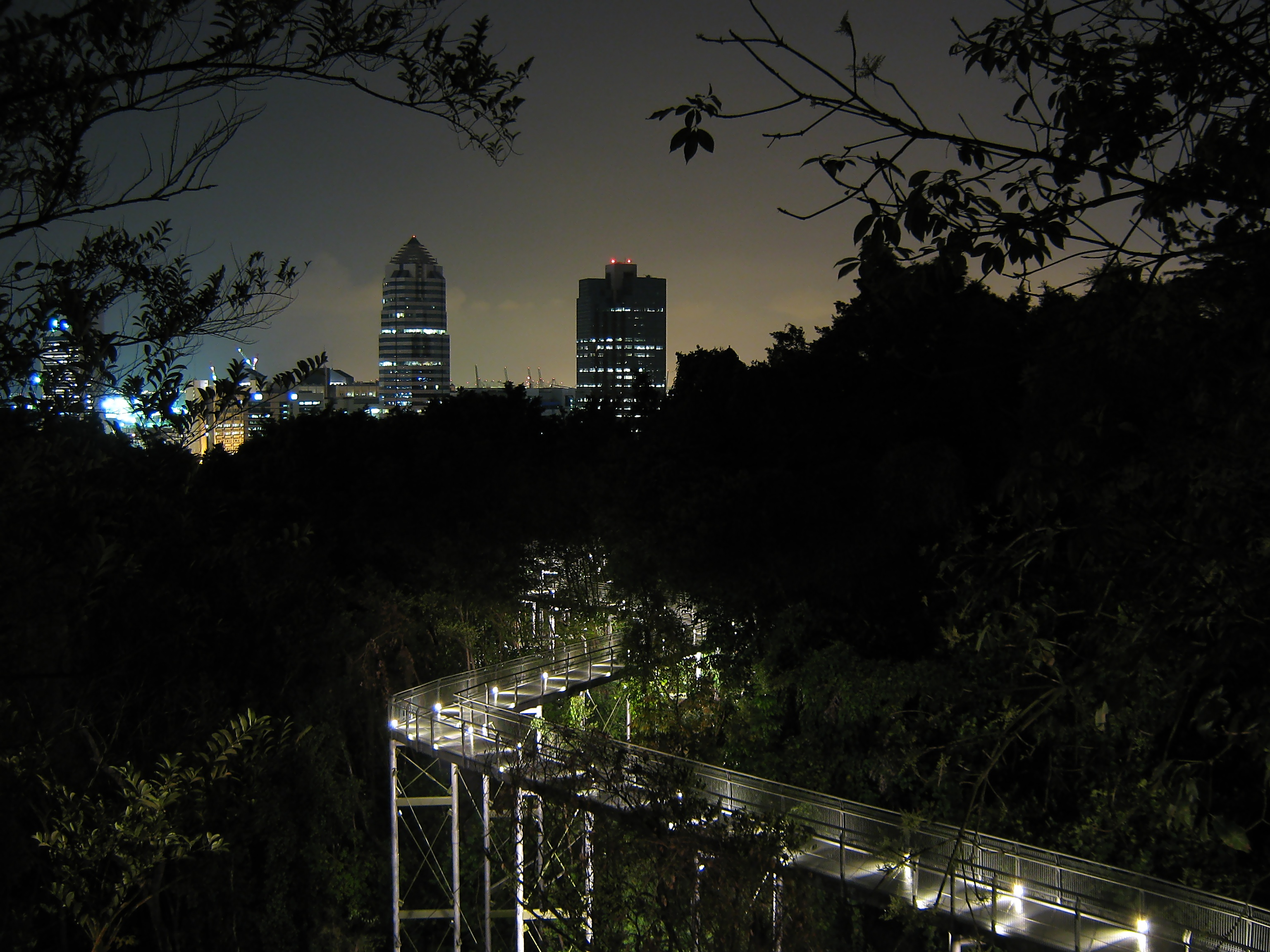
- Part of the elevated walkway of the Forest Walk in Telok Blangah Hill Park

- Location within Singapore
- Type: park
- Location: Singapore
- Area: 34 hectares (84 acres)
- Elevation: 94 metres (308 ft)
- Owner: National Parks Board
- Administrator: National Parks Board
- Operator: National Parks Board
- Open: 24 Hours
- Status: Open
- Hiking trails: Forest Trail- 1.3km Elevated Walkway
- Paths: Earth Trail

Telok Blangah Hill Park is a park situated at Telok Blangah Green, off Henderson Road, in Bukit Merah. It connects to Mount Faber Park via Henderson Waves bridge. Standing at 36m (118ft) above Henderson Road, it is the tallest pedestrian bridge in Singapore. Henderson Waves is renowned for its artistic, distinctive wave-like structure consisting of a series of undulating curved 'ribs'.

Telok Blangah Hill Park is also part of the Southern Ridges, which also comprises Mount Faber Park, HortPark, Kent Ridge Park and Labrador Nature Reserve.

== History ==
In 1994, S$400,000 was spent on a slope in Telok Blangah Hill Park to strengthen the soil after recent landslides. After heavy rain on 28 February 2023, the Forest Walk trail in the park was closed off in March 2023 due to a slope failure. The closure of the trail, as well as another trail, the Earth Trail, in park would remain closed until end July 2026 to stabilise the slope and strengthen the foundation of the elevated Forest Walk trail.

== See also ==
- List of parks in Singapore
- Southern Ridges
