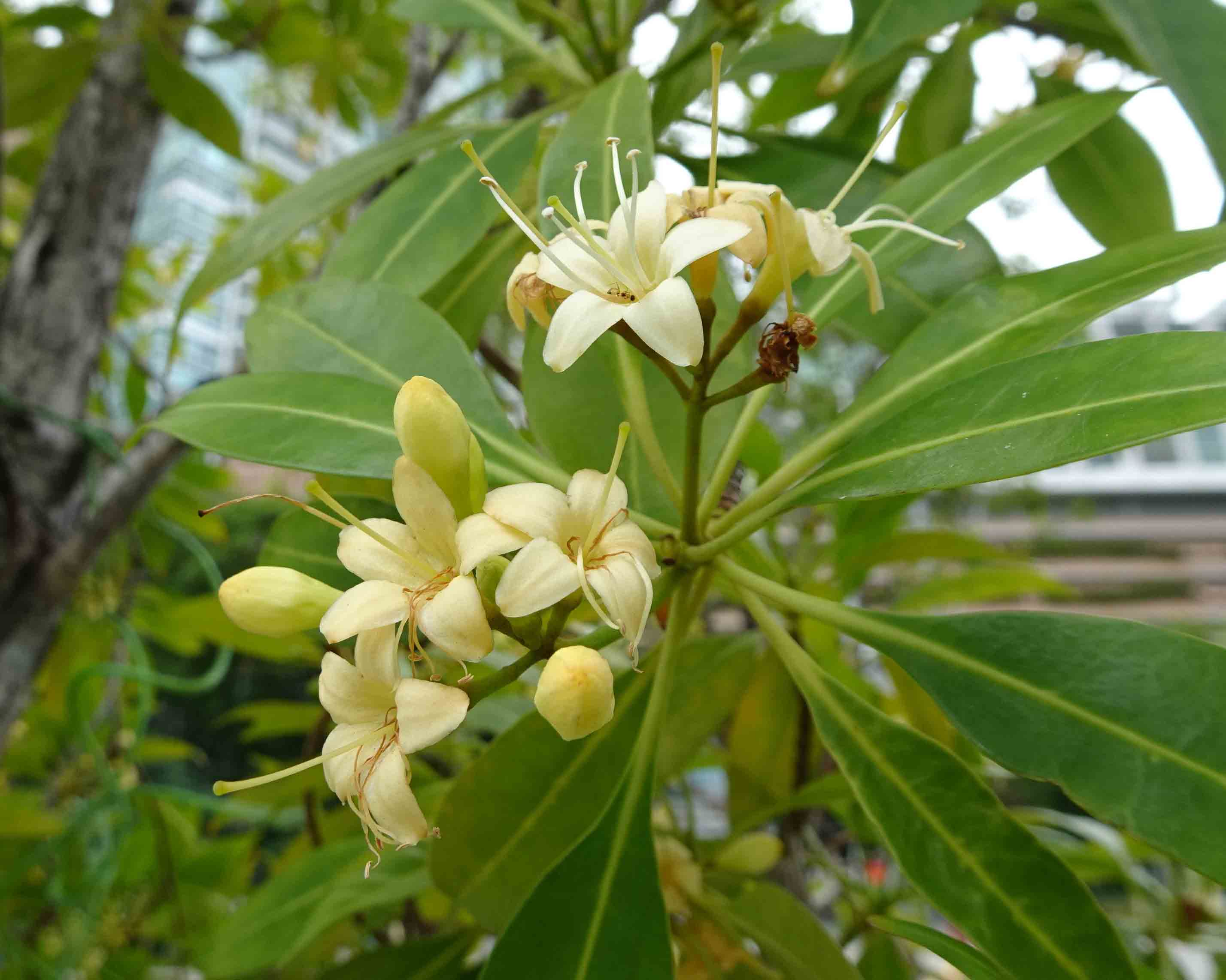
- Flower of Cyrtophyllum fragrans (Singapore)

Scientific classification
- Kingdom: Plantae
- Clade: Tracheophytes
- Clade: Angiosperms
- Clade: Eudicots
- Clade: Asterids
- Order: Gentianales
- Family: Gentianaceae
- Tribe: Potalieae
- Subtribe: Potaliinae
- Genus: Cyrtophyllum; Reinw.

= Cyrtophyllum =

Genus of flowering plants

Cyrtophyllum is a genus of tropical Asian tree species in the family Gentianaceae and the tribe Potalieae. Species may have previously been placed in the genus Fagraea and can be found in Indo-China and Malesia.

== Species ==
Plants of the World Online currently includes five accepted species:

- Cyrtophyllum caudatum (Ridl.) K.M.Wong
- Cyrtophyllum fragrans (Roxb.) DC. (the Tembusu tree)
- Cyrtophyllum giganteum (Ridl.) Ridl.
- Cyrtophyllum lanceolatum DC.
- Cyrtophyllum minutiflorum K.M.Wong
