= Mount Faber =

Hill in Bukit Merah, Singapore

Coordinates: 1°16′25.7″N 103°49′03.0″E

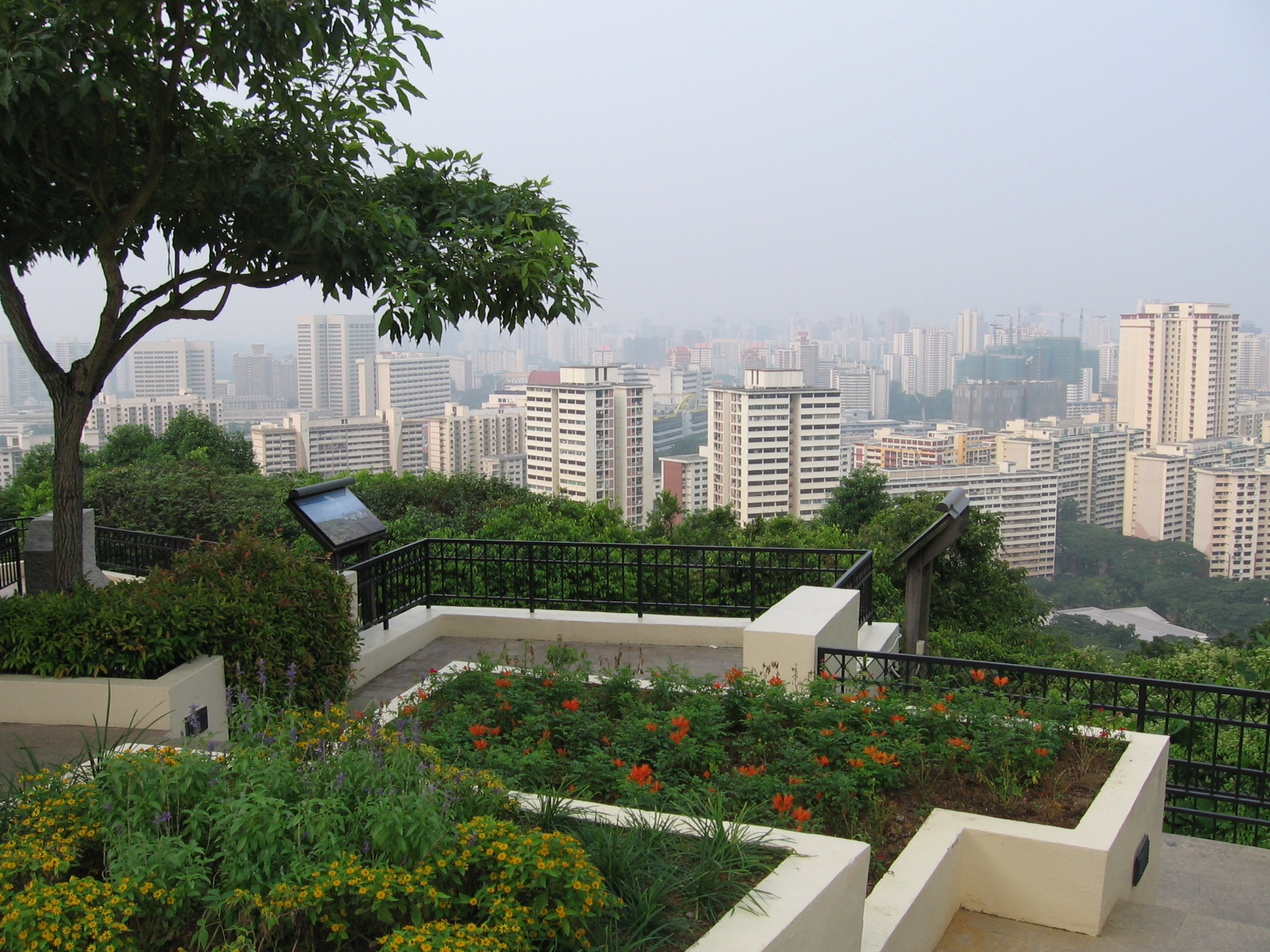

Highest point
- Elevation: 348 feet (106 m)

Naming
- Native name: Bukit Telok Blangah (Malay)

Geography
- Location within Singapore
- Location: Singapore
- Parent range: 56 hectares

Geology
- Mountain type: hill

Mount Faber

Name transcription(s)
  - Chinese: 花柏山
  - Pinyin: Hūa bǎi shān
  - Malay: Bukit Faber
  - Tamil: பேபர் மலை
- Interactive map of Mount Faber
- Country: Singapore

Mount Faber, formerly Telok Blangah Hill, is a hill about 94 metres (308 ft) in height, located in the town of Bukit Merah in the Central Region of Singapore. It overlooks the Telok Blangah area and the western parts of the Central Area. The summit is accessible by Mount Faber Road or Mount Faber Loop via Morse Road, but there are many footpaths or trails leading up the hill. The main paths are: Marang Trail, which leads from Marang Road at the HarbourFront MRT station (Exit D), and the Southern Ridges Park Connector which connects from Telok Blangah Hill Park, Kent Ridge Park, and Henderson Waves.

It is a major tourist attraction, as it provides a panoramic view of Singapore's Downtown Core. Its slope includes a tower that is part of the Singapore cable car system that connects to HarbourFront and Sentosa. It is accessible from the HarbourFront MRT station.

== History ==
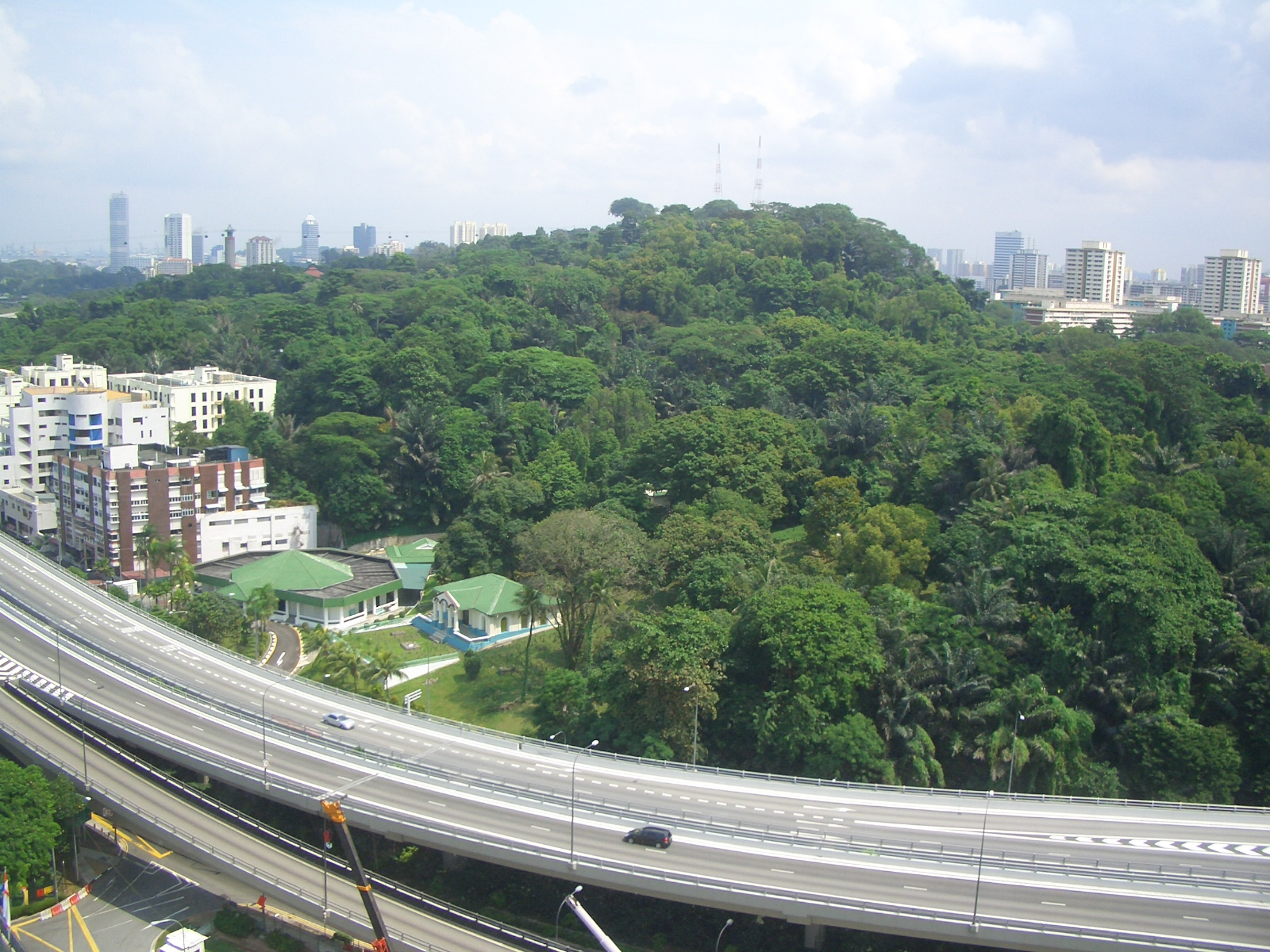
View of Mount Faber from Prima Tower Revolving Restaurant

In 1972, the government spent S$63,910 to renovate the bunkers and turn Mount Faber into a landscaped scenic spot. Construction on the S$2.94 million cable car system to link Mount Faber and Sentosa together also began.

== Geography ==
The vegetation around Mount Faber is a secondary rainforest that is smaller and less dense than on Bukit Timah Hill. Mount Faber is one of the higher hills in Singapore at 106 metres (348 ft), lower than Bukit Timah Hill (164 m (538 ft)) and Bukit Gombak (133 m (436 ft)) and 113 m (371 ft)). It is separated from the adjacent slightly lower Telok Blangah Hill Park by Henderson Road.

== Gallery ==
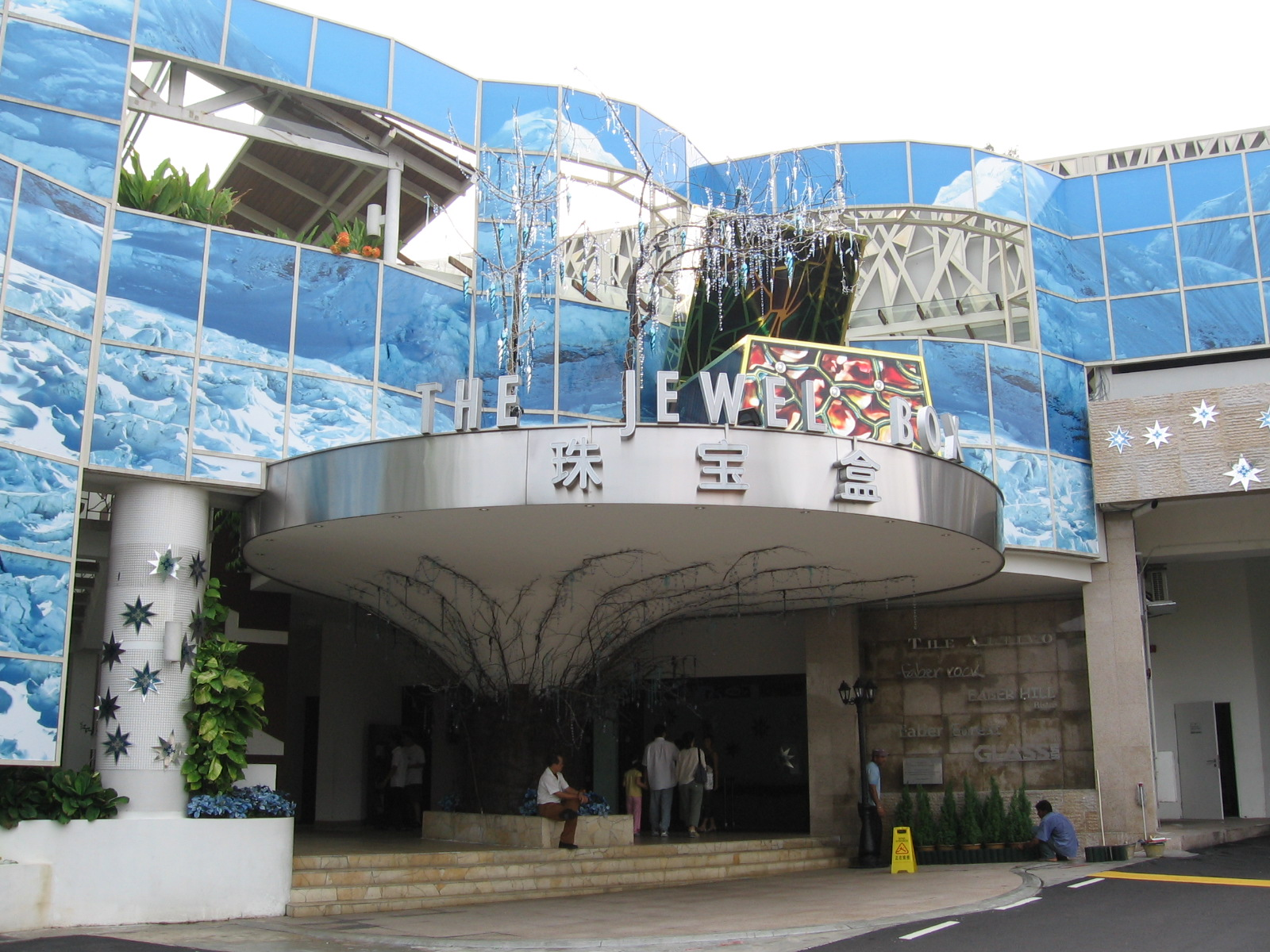
The Jewel Box on Mount Faber houses the cable car station to Sentosa.

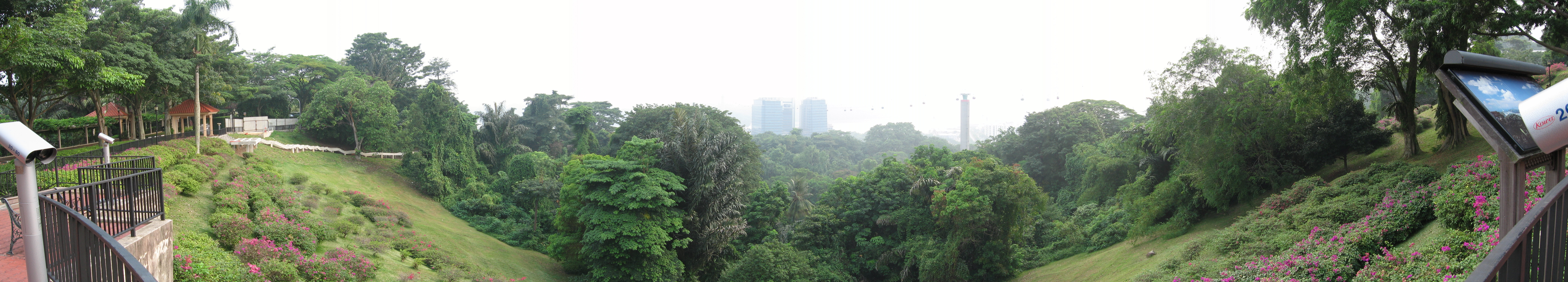
Panoramic view of HarbourFront from Mount Faber Park

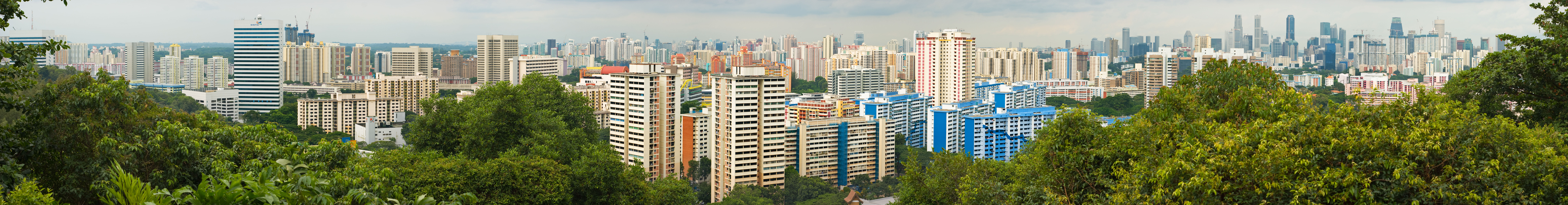
Panoramic view from Mount Faber, September 2008.

== See also ==
- List of parks in Singapore
