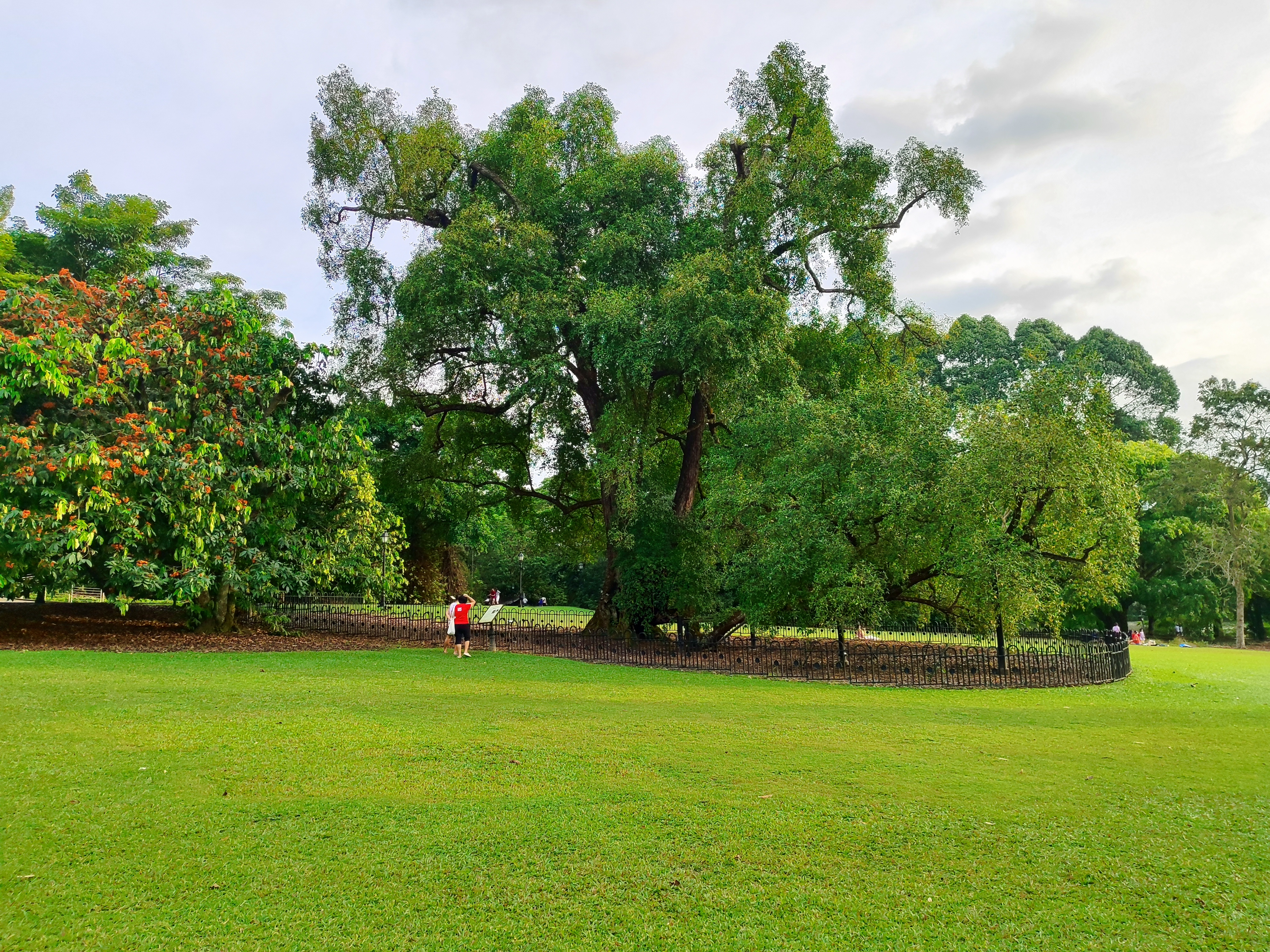
- At Singapore Botanic Gardens

Conservation status
- Least Concern (IUCN 3.1)

Scientific classification
- Kingdom: Plantae
- Clade: Tracheophytes
- Clade: Angiosperms
- Clade: Eudicots
- Clade: Asterids
- Order: Gentianales
- Family: Gentianaceae
- Genus: Cyrtophyllum
- Species: C. fragrans

Binomial name
- Cyrtophyllum fragrans (Roxb.) DC.

Synonyms
- Fagraea fragrans Roxb.; Fagraea peregrina (Reinw.) Blume; Cyrtophyllum peregrinum Reinw.; Willughbeia fragrans (Roxb.) Spreng.

= Tembusu =

Species of tree

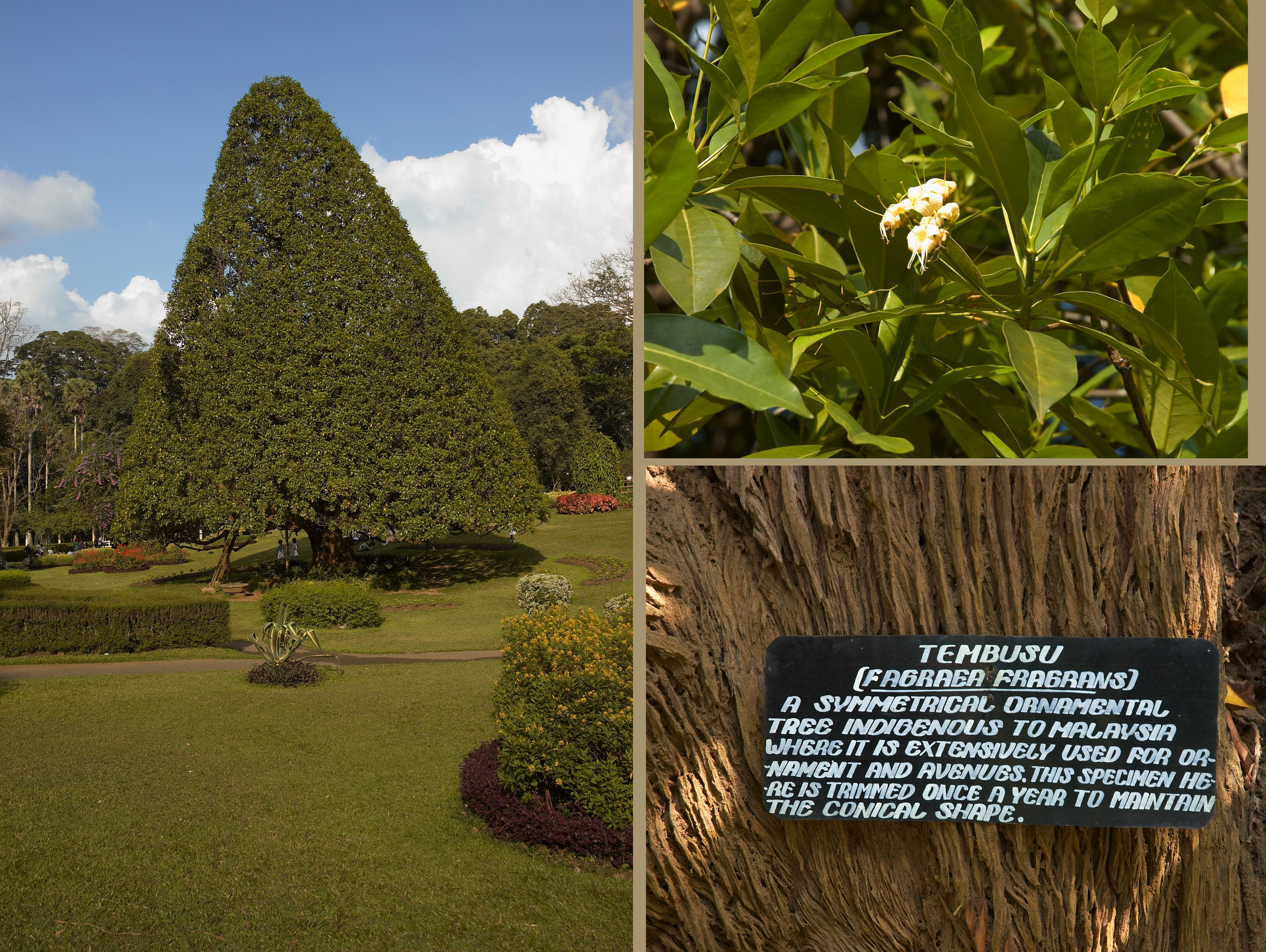
In the Kandy botanic garden, Sri Lanka

The tembusu (/təmˈbuːsuː, tɛm-/, təm-BOO-soo or tem-BOO-soo), is a large evergreen tree in the family Gentianaceae, native to Southeast Asia (from Indo-China to New Guinea). It is the Malay name for Cyrtophyllum fragrans (synonym Fagraea fragrans). It is also known as ironwood.

Its trunk is dark brown, with deeply fissured bark, looking somewhat like a bittergourd. The tree grows in an irregular shape from 10 to 25 metres high, with light green oval-shaped leaves, and yellowish flowers with a distinct fragrance. The fruits of the tree are bitter tasting red berries, which are eaten by Pteropus fruit bats.

== Uses ==
The trunk of this tree can produce very hard wood that can be used to make chopping boards and floors. The wood can last over a hundred years, as it is not consumed by termites and weevils.

== Cultural significance ==
A distinctive and well-loved tembusu tree growing in the Singapore Botanic Gardens is pictured on the Singaporean five-dollar bill.
