= Lithocarpus cantleyanus =

Conservation status
- Least Concern (IUCN 3.1)

Scientific classification
- Kingdom: Plantae
- Clade: Tracheophytes
- Clade: Angiosperms
- Clade: Eudicots
- Clade: Rosids
- Order: Fagales
- Family: Fagaceae
- Genus: Lithocarpus
- Species: L. cantleyanus

Binomial name
- Lithocarpus cantleyanus (King ex Hook.f.) Rehder

Synonyms
- Pasania cantleyana (King ex Hook.f.) Gamble; Quercus cantleyana King ex Hook.f.; Synaedrys cantleyana (King ex Hook.f.) Koidz.

Species of tree

Lithocarpus cantleyanus is a tree in the beech family Fagaceae. It is named for a superintendent of the Singapore Botanic Gardens, Nathaniel Cantley.

== Description ==
Lithocarpus cantleyanus grows as a tree up to 36 metres (120 ft) tall with a trunk diameter of up to 70 cm (30 in). The greyish brown bark is scaly or fissured or lenticellate. The coriaceous leaves measure up to 16 cm (6 in) long. Its brown acorns are ovoid and measure up to 2 cm (0.8 in) across.

== Distribution and habitat ==
Lithocarpus cantleyanus grows naturally in Myanmar, Thailand, Peninsular Malaysia, Singapore and Borneo. Its habitat is hill dipterocarp forests up to 900 m (3,000 ft) altitude.
