= Nathaniel Cantley =

Botanist

- Born: 19 April 1847; Halkirk, Caithness
- Died: 29 February 1888 (aged 40); Hobart, Tasmania
- Scientific career
- Fields: Botany
- Author abbrev. (botany): Cantley

Nathaniel Cantley (1847–1888) was a British botanist and expert in tropical horticulture, agriculture, and forestry.

Nathaniel Cantley worked at Kew Gardens and was then from 1872 to 1880 the assistant director of the Royal Botanic Gardens, Pamplemousses in Mauritius. In 1880 he was appointed superintendent of the Singapore Botanic Gardens, as successor to Henry James Murton.

Cantley continued to improve on the Gardens, and was responsible for building new facilities such as the office (now Ridley Hall), the Plant House, an arboretum in the Economic Garden and plant nurseries. ... An avid botanist, Cantley placed the Gardens on a firm systematic footing and made an extensive collection of herbarium specimens from Singapore and the region, many of which can be found in the SING herbarium today. Cantley was also appointed as the first Superintendent of the Forest Department, and was responsible for surveying and gazetting the first forest reserves in Singapore and the Straits Settlements.

In an official report, Cantley estimated that by 1883 about 93 percent of the Straits Settlements' original inland forest had been destroyed.

He became sick with fever in Singapore and went on a voyage to Australia with his wife. He died from his illness in Hobart, Tasmania. His successor as superintendent was Henry Nicholas Ridley.

== Eponyms ==
- Lithocarpus cantleyanus
- Memecylon cantleyi
