= Sydney Harpley =

British sculptor

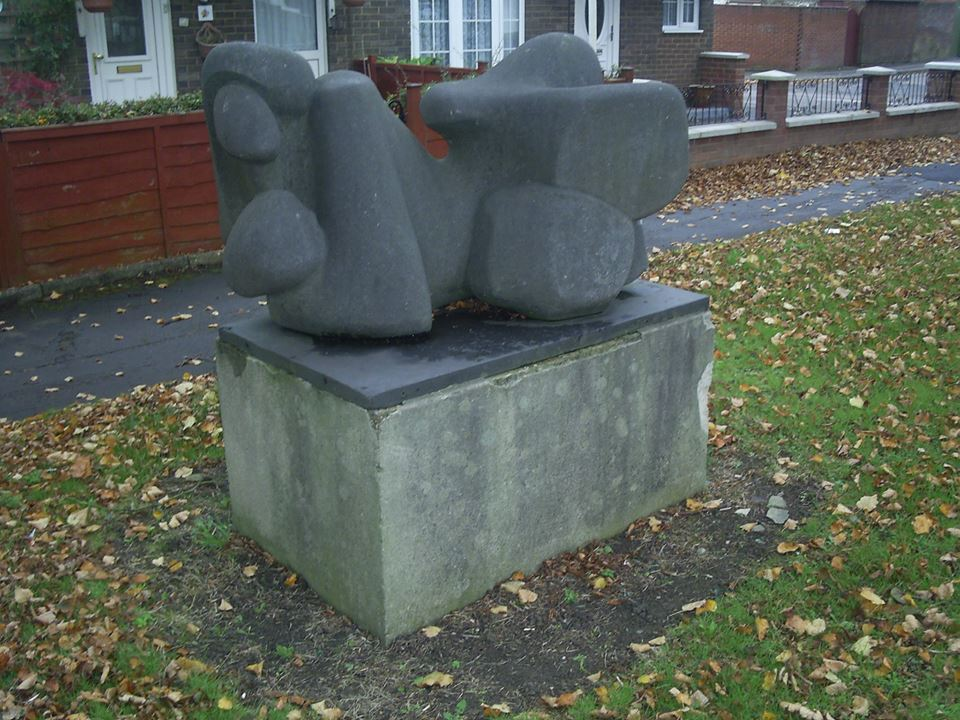
1962 sculpture by Sydney Harpley called 'Reclining Figures'. Located at the corner of Jupiter Drive and Martian Avenue in Hemel Hempstead UK.

Sydney Charles Harpley RA (19 April 1927 in London, England - 9 March 1992) was a British sculptor. He was elected to the Academy of Realist Art (ARA) on 25 Apr 1974 and the Royal Academy (R.A) on 24 Mar 1981. His first major sale was Little girl circa 1956, a statue of a seated school girl, now in the Museum of New Zealand. The naturalness of the pose is considered to be due to his experience modelling artificial limbs in the late 1940s.

Other works include Study of Josephine Harpley (the artist's wife) on a Rope Hammock and Reading a Book. Mostly held privately. Some street sculpture in Hemel Hempstead new town from 1962. The joy of cycling in the Singapore Botanical Gardens Dated 1987.
