= Symphony Lake (Singapore) =

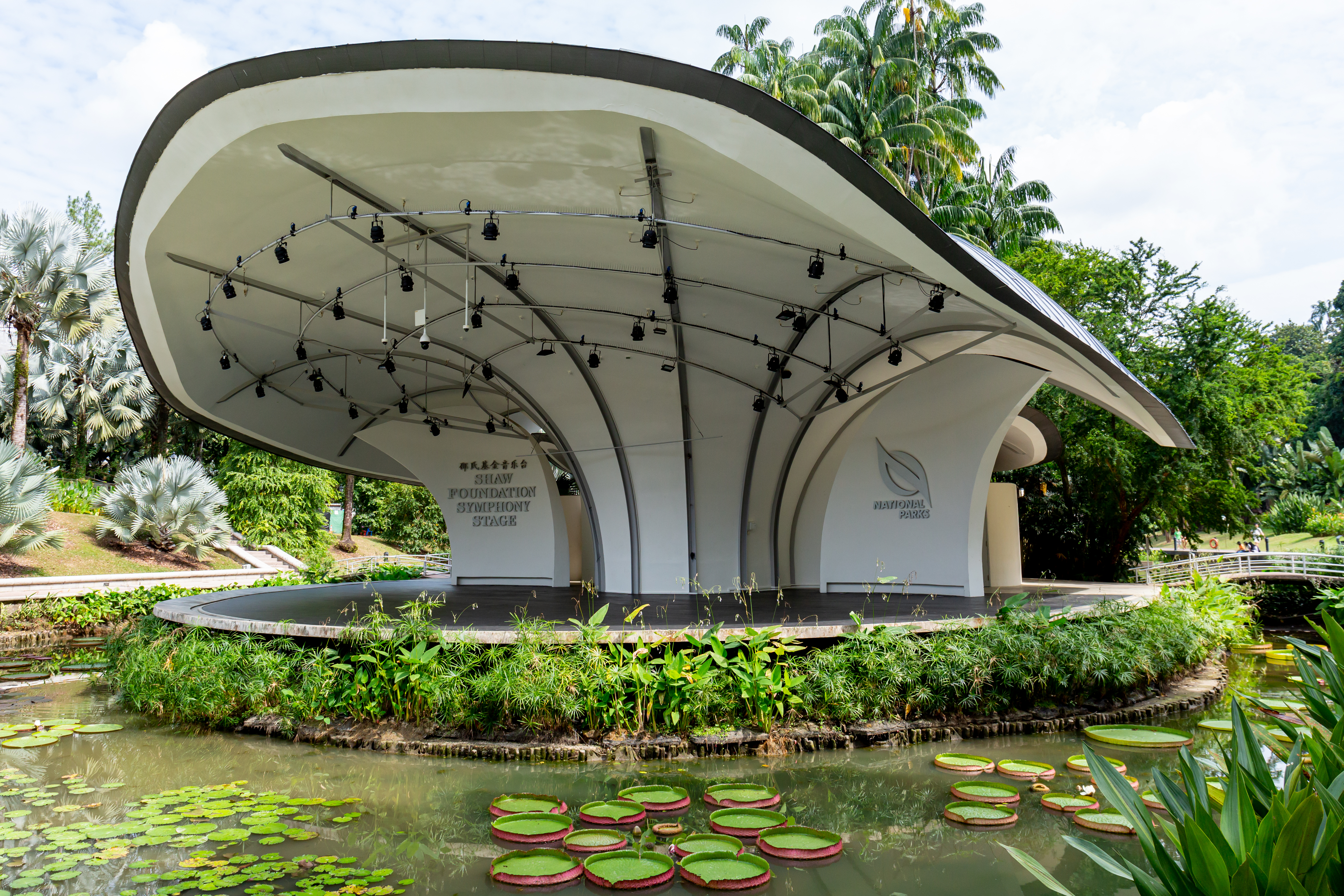
- The Shaw Foundation Symphony Stage on the lake

- Location within Singapore
- Location: Singapore Botanic Gardens
- Coordinates: 1°18′51″N 103°48′53″E
- Type: artificial lake
- Basin countries: Singapore

Symphony Lake is a lake in the Singapore Botanic Gardens, Singapore.

Built in 1974, it is an artificial lake and feature a large stage known as the Shaw Foundation Symphony Stage built in 1994 on an islet in the middle of the water body. The stage is most known as the venue for the Singapore Symphony Orchestra's monthly SSO in the Park open-concept concerts, hence giving the lake its name.

Symphony Lake is located in the Central Core of Singapore Botanic Gardens.

== See also ==
- Swan Lake
