= Swan Lake (Singapore) =

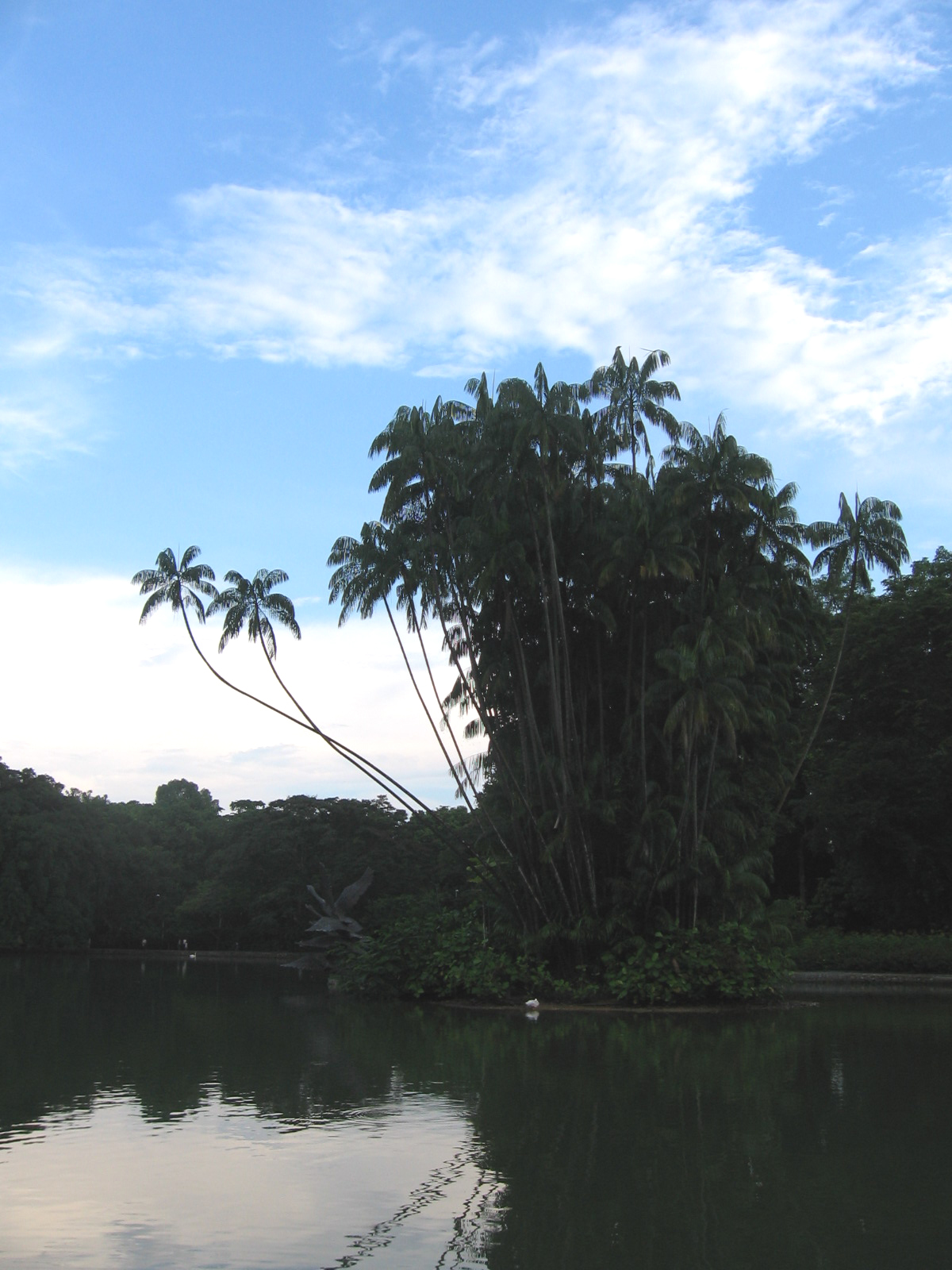
- Swan Lake in the foreground with coconut trees in the background.

- Location within Singapore
- Location: Singapore Botanic Gardens
- Coordinates: 1.307896°N 103.8159205°E
- Type: artificial lake
- Basin countries: Singapore
- Surface area: 15,000 m^{2} (160,000 sq ft)

Swan Lake is an artificial lake located at the Singapore Botanic Gardens in Singapore.

It was formerly also known as the Main Lake or the First Lake. It was constructed in 1866, shortly after the Gardens formation.

It is considered the oldest ornamental water feature in Singapore.

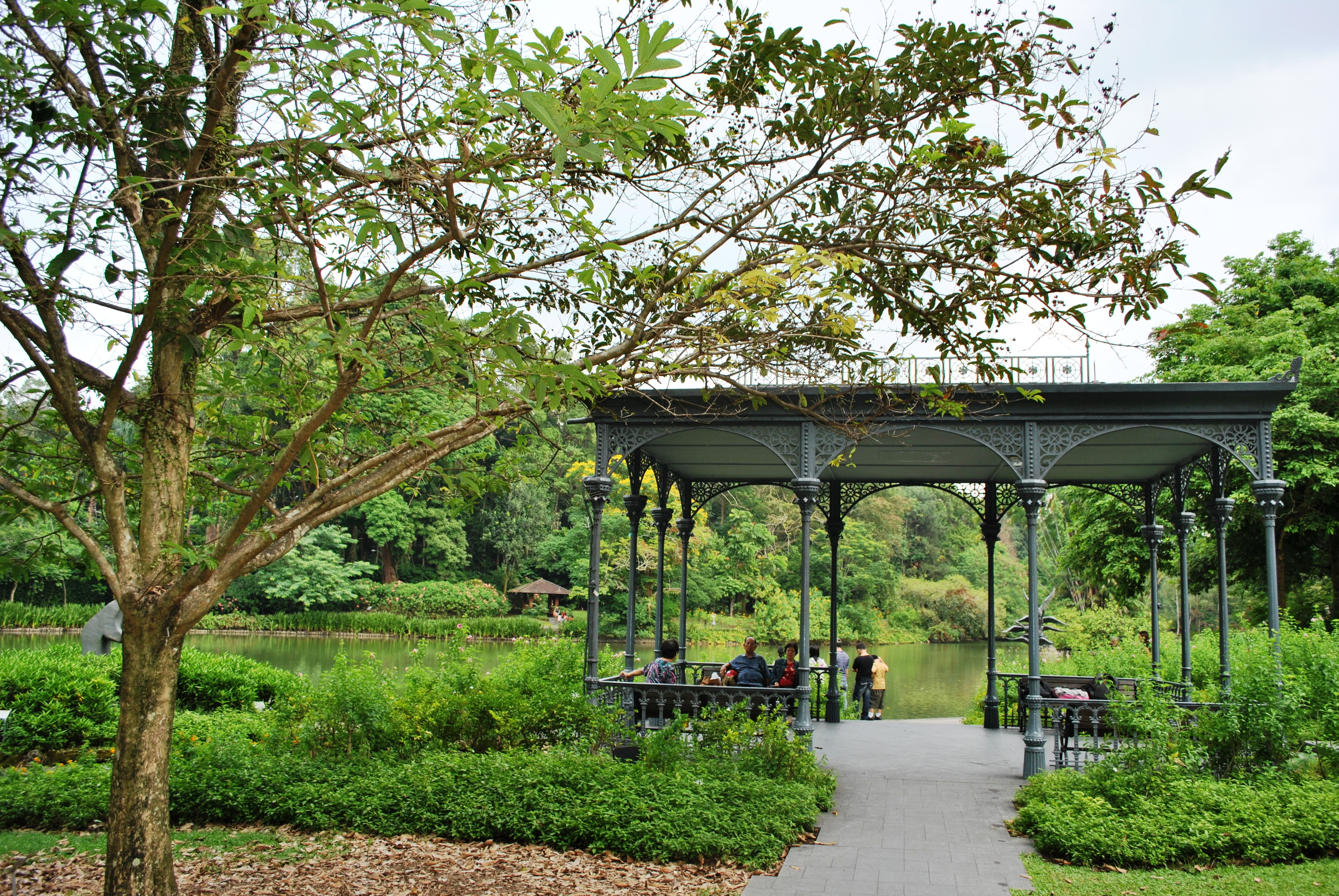
Swan Lake (Singapore)

== See also ==
- Symphony Lake
- National Orchid Garden
- Jacob Ballas Children's Garden
