= List of public art in Hemel Hempstead =

This is a list of public art in Hemel Hempstead, in Hertfordshire, England.

Image	Title / subject depicted	Location	Date	Sculptor	Material	Source	Coordinates
	Phoenix Gateway sculpture Buncefield fire	Roundabout at the junction of the A414 and Green Lane	2009	Jose Zavala	Blue steel arches		51.756246°N 0.423952°W
	Rock'n'Roll	The Water Gardens, Hemel Hempstead	1962	Hubert Yencesse	Bronze		51.748499°N 0.474025°W
	Development of Man	Corner of Bridge Street above the Santander bank	1955	A H Gerrard	Portland stone		51.751242°N 0.472672°W
	'A Point for Reflection' -_{Associations with water for the Riverside Shopping Centre, a droplet of clouds, rain, swirling rivulets and weaving water weeds.}	Marlowes at entrance to Riverside shopping development.	2008	Tim Shutter	Hand carved Perryfield Whitbed Portland Stone.		51.747798°N 0.472687°W
	Tile Mosaic Map	Junction of the Marlowes and Hillfiled Road on the side of the NCP multistory car park.	1960	Rowland Emett	Mosaic		51.752826°N 0.472083°W
	Reclining Figures	The corner of Jupiter Drive and Martian Avenue	1962	Sydney Harpley	Sculpture		51.765221°N 51.765221°E
	Boy with Cat	Hyperion Court Highfield, Hemel Hempstead	1962	John Mills	Sculpture		51.766829°N 0.453060°W
	Girl Combing Hair	Martian Avenue, Hemel Hempstead	1962	Sydney Harpley	Irish limestone Sculpture		51.766146°N 0.450982°W
	Mother and Child	St Nicholas Day Nursary, Eastwick Row, Hemel Hempstead	Not known	Not known	Steel frame stucco		51.750045°N 0.449215°W
	Mother and Child	The Apple Orchard, Hemel Hempstead	Not known	Commissioned by Geoffrey Teychanne			51.761°N 0.453781°W
	Discobolus: The Discus Thrower	N/A; Formerly at the Water Gardens, due to be relocated to The Bury	pre 1960	unknown	Bronze cast, Copy of 5th Century Greek marble		51.749550°N 0.474656°W
	Residents Rainbow	Marlowes, Hemel Hempstead	1993	Colin Lambert Rainbow Mosaic added by Gary Drostle in 2010	Concrete arch with mosaic		51.749228°N 0.472639°W
	Waterplay _{The work symbolises the energy co-operation and sporting spirit of the youth in Dacorum.}	Marlowes, Hemel Hempstead	1993	Michael Rizzello	Two water cascades and bronze sculpture of child gymnasts.		51.749459°N 0.472457°W
	Bronze Relief Map of Town	Marlowes, Hemel Hempstead	1992	Graham Thompson (Designer) and John Ravera (Sculptor)	Bronze relief map		51.749956°N 0.472672°W
	Replica Kangaroo, Joey and Platypus statues._{A gift from the Australian New town of Elizabeth}	The Water Gardens, Hemel Hempstead	1963.	John Dowie	Bronze		51.750659°N 0.474170°W
	Tree of Life	Junction of Bridge Street and Marlowes		Richard Quinnell	Steel		
	Hugging Couple VIII	The Forget-Me-Not Memorial Garden for Babies, Gadebridge Park		Mark Humphrey			
	Unknown (Recalling Kodak's global association with the film industry)	Behind the KD Tower, Hemel Hempstead	2010	Unknown	Galvanised steel		
	The Magic Roundabout	In green area in front of Mosaic House	2011	Gary Drostle	Porcelain Mosaic		51°45'18.8"N 0°28'15.3"W
