= National Orchid Garden =

Orchid garden in Singapore

Coordinates: 1.3157°N 103.8139°E

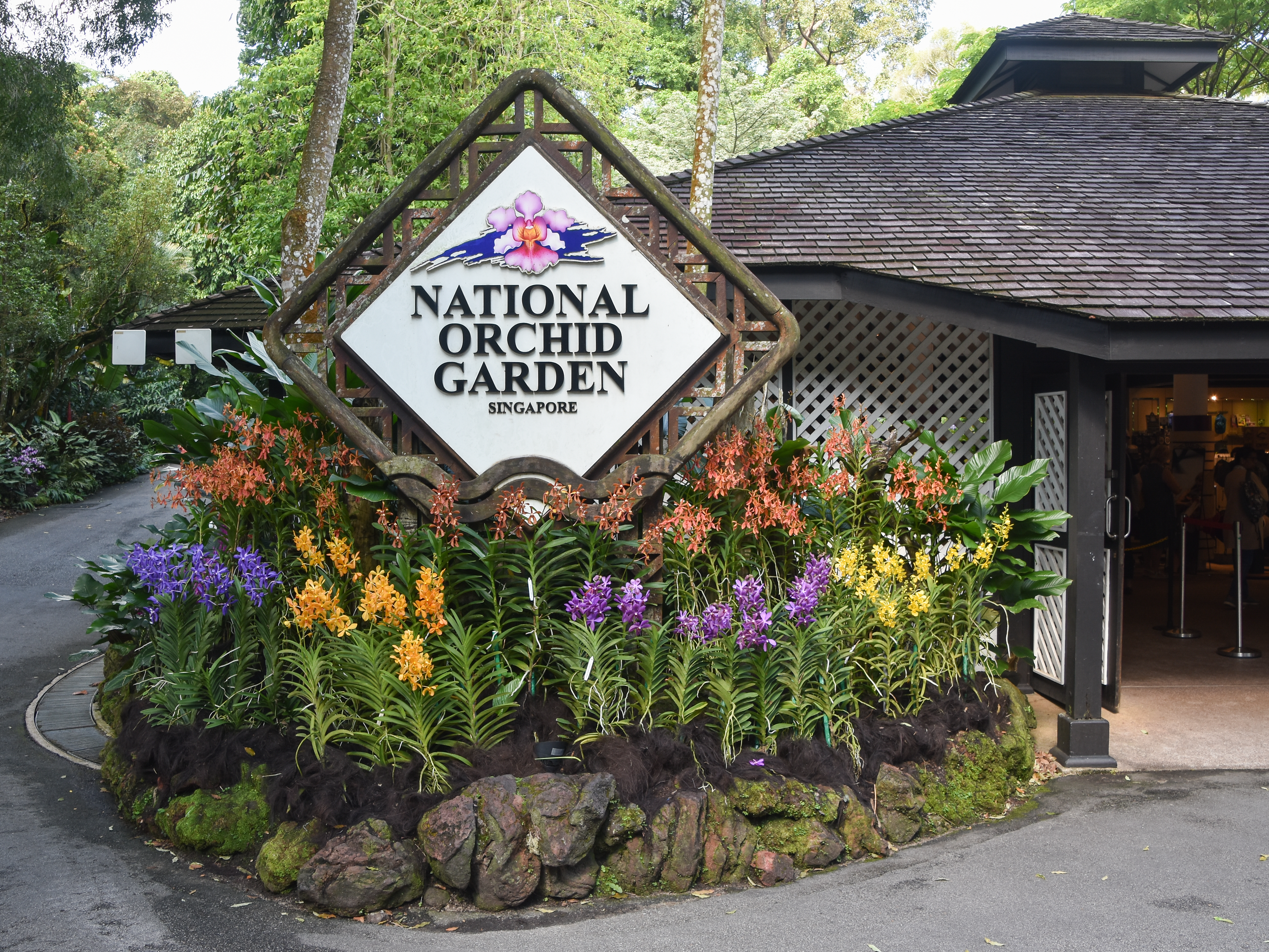

The National Orchid Garden, located within the Singapore Botanic Gardens, was opened on 20 October 1995 by Senior Minister Lee Kuan Yew.

The National Orchid Garden is located in the Central Core of the gardens.

Located on the highest hill in the Singapore Botanic Gardens, three hectares of landscaped slopes provide a setting for over 1,000 species and 2,000 hybrids, with about 600 species and hybrids on display.

== Gallery ==
=== Hybrids to honour visitors ===
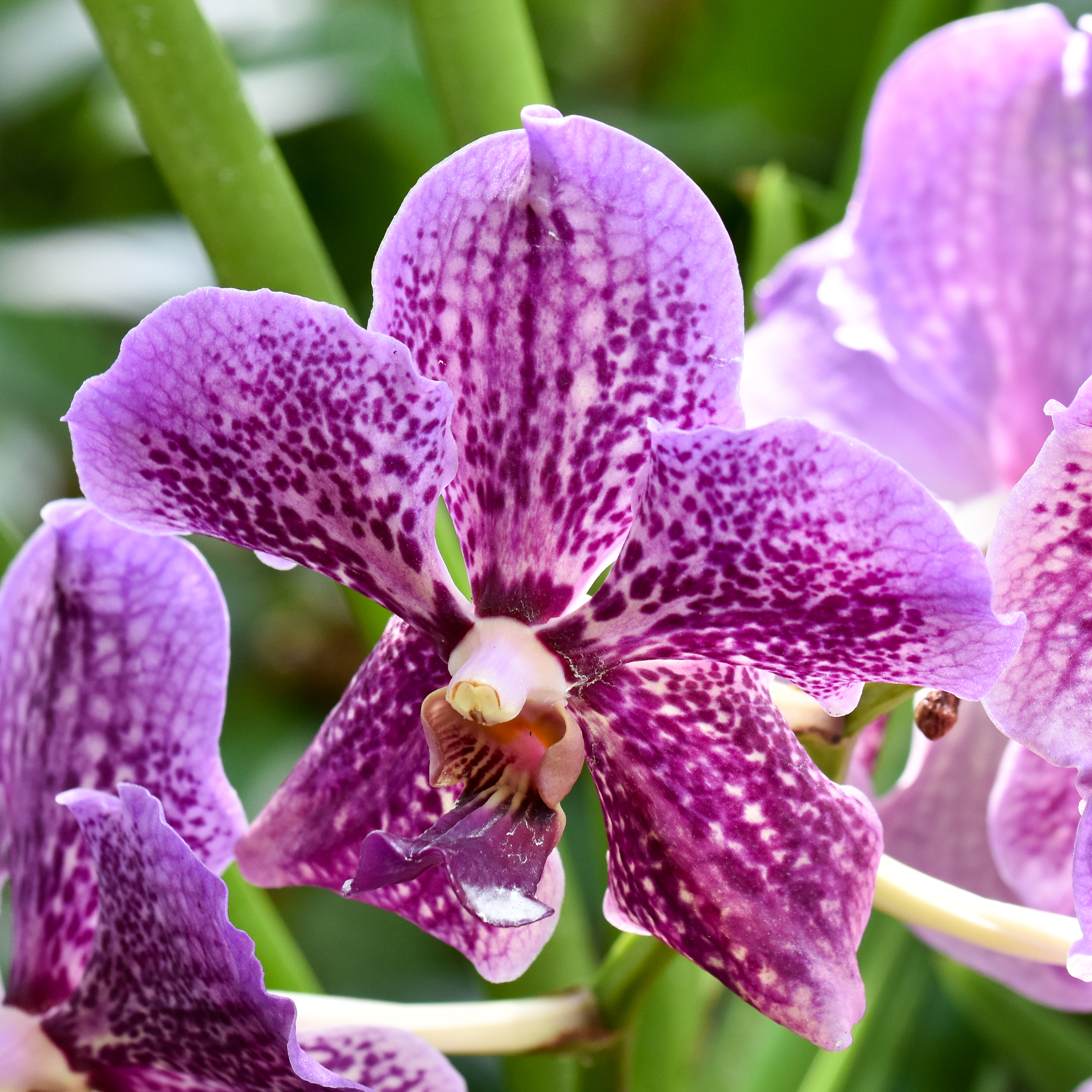
Papilionanda Ban Ki-moon Yoo Soon-taek (UN Secretary-General)

== See also ==
- Singapore Botanic Gardens
- List of parks in Singapore
