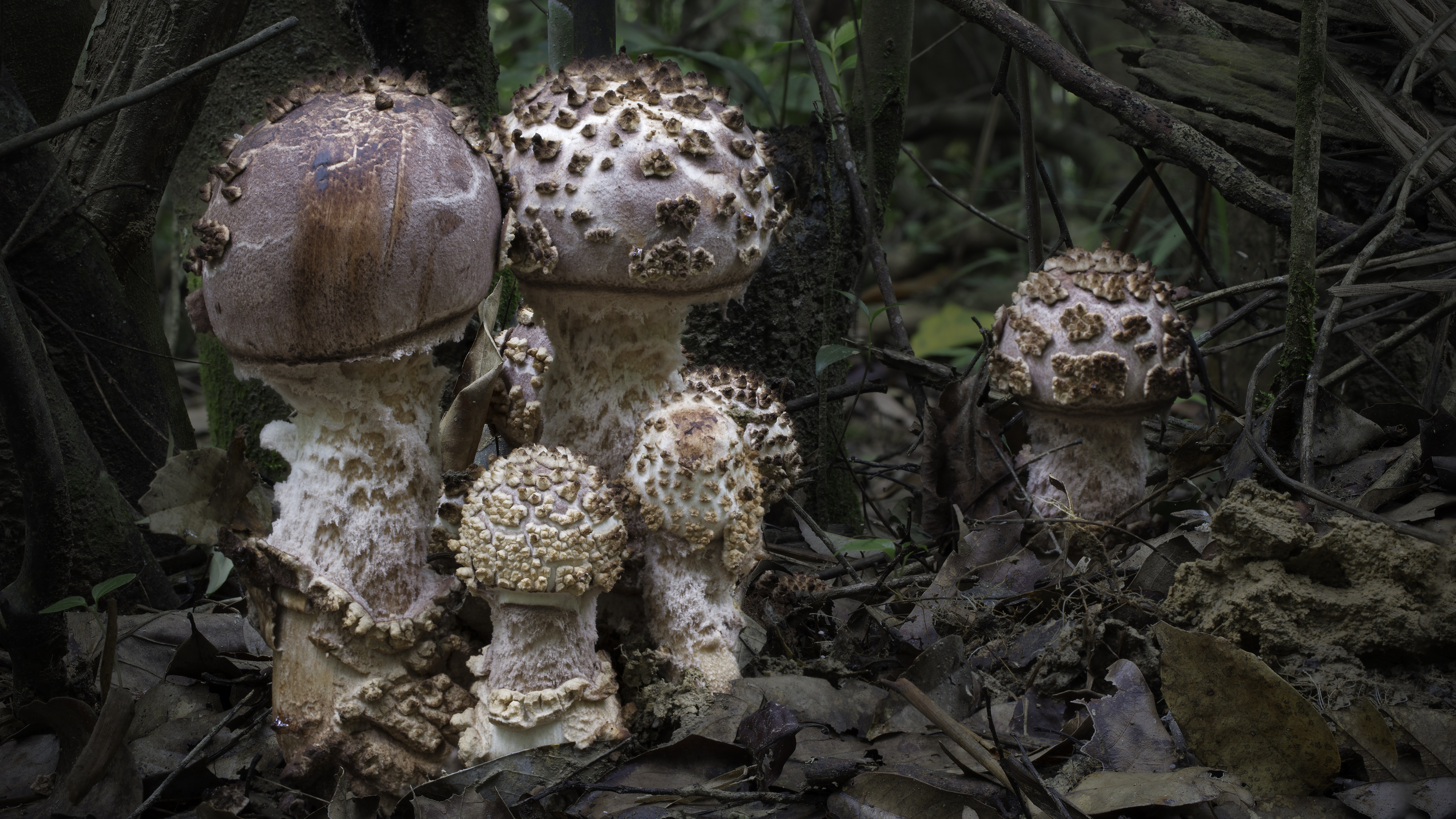

Scientific classification
- Kingdom: Fungi
- Division: Basidiomycota
- Class: Agaricomycetes
- Order: Agaricales
- Family: Amanitaceae
- Genus: Amanita
- Species: A. sculpta

Binomial name
- Amanita sculpta Corner & Bas 1962

= Amanita sculpta =

Species of fungus

Amanita sculpta is a species of Amanita. It is distinctive because of its large size, with caps 10 to 27 centimetres (4 to 10 1/2 inches) in diameter. The cap's appearance, beige and dark brown with pileal warts, has been compared to that of a chocolate chip cookie.

The species was first collected in the Bukit Timah Nature Reserve in 1939, and was described as new to science in 1962 by botanist E. J. H. Corner. It is found in Singapore, China, Japan, Malaysia, Thailand and Laos. It is a rare mushroom that has been put up for assessment for the IUCN Red List, and there were no sightings of it in Singapore until it was rediscovered there in 2020.
