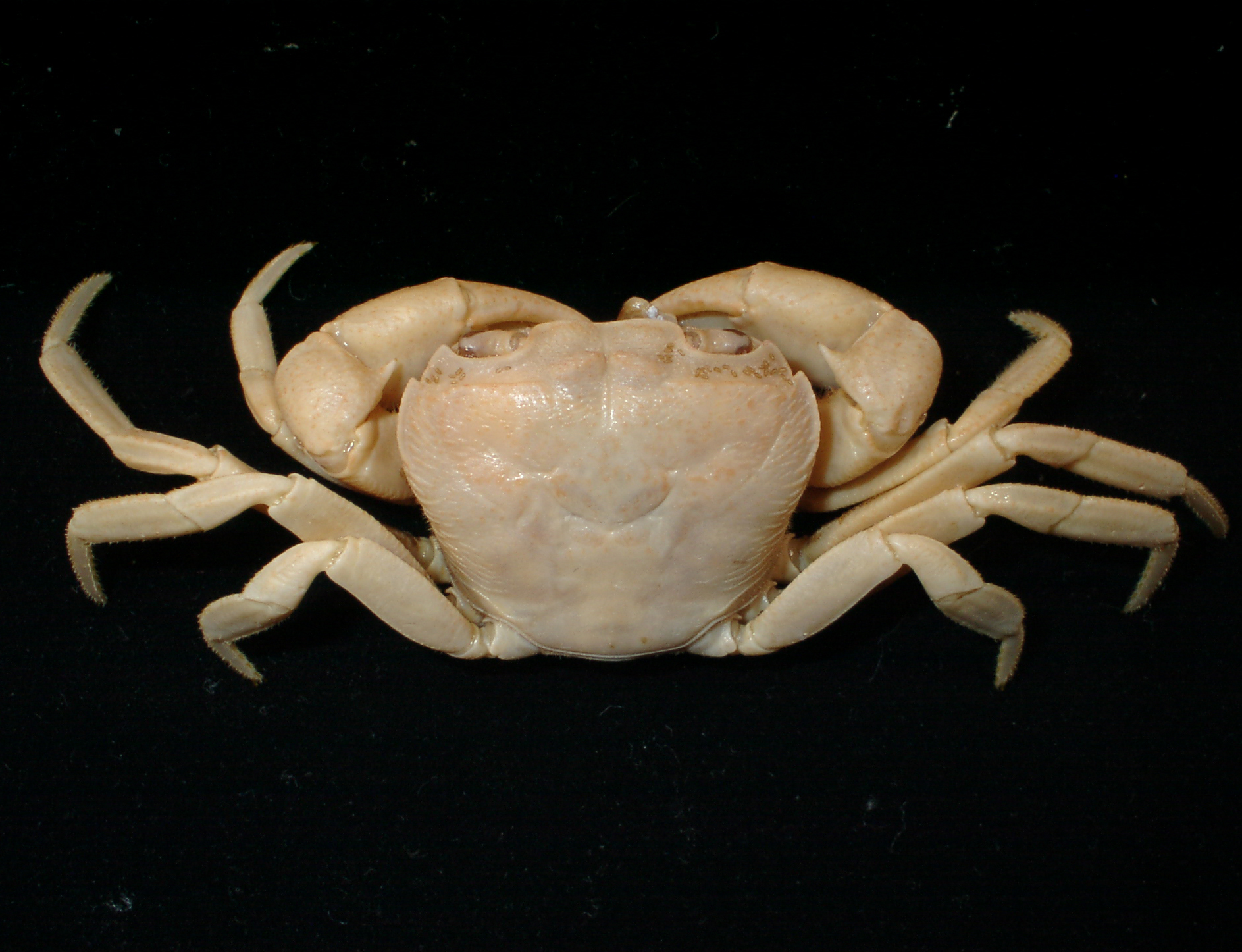

Conservation status
- Least Concern (IUCN 3.1)

Scientific classification
- Kingdom: Animalia
- Phylum: Arthropoda
- Clade: Pancrustacea
- Class: Malacostraca
- Order: Decapoda
- Suborder: Pleocyemata
- Infraorder: Brachyura
- Family: Potamidae
- Genus: Johora
- Species: J. thaiana

Binomial name
- Johora thaiana (Leelawathanagoon, Lheknim & Ng, 2005)

= Johora thaiana =

Species of crab

Johora thaiana is a species of freshwater crab described from specimens found in Thailand, as the name was derived. Most species in this genus are found in Singapore and Peninsular Malaysia so this is the most northern species of the genus. The crab is completely aquatic and can be found under rocks or vegetation in flowing streams and adjacent pools. However, they tend to inhabit sheltered habitats with slower water. They are active more at night.
