= Johora singaporensis =

Conservation status
- Critically Endangered (IUCN 3.1)

Scientific classification
- Kingdom: Animalia
- Phylum: Arthropoda
- Class: Malacostraca
- Order: Decapoda
- Suborder: Pleocyemata
- Infraorder: Brachyura
- Family: Potamidae
- Genus: Johora
- Species: J. singaporensis

Binomial name
- Johora singaporensis (Ng, 1986)

Synonyms
- Stoliczia singaporensis Ng, 1986

Species of crab

Johora singaporensis, the Singapore stream crab or Singapore freshwater crab, is a critically endangered species of freshwater crab endemic to Singapore. It grows to a size of 30 millimetres (1.2 in) wide.

== Ecology ==
J. singaporensis lives in streams running through undisturbed forest, where it hides under rocks at the stream's edge, or inside aggregations of leaves and detritus. It is mostly nocturnal, feeding on detritus and oligochaete worms which live in the muddy stream bed.

== Distribution ==
J. singaporensis only lives in Singapore, and has only ever been recorded from two locations. One of these was inside Bukit Timah Nature Reserve, but that population is believed to have been extirpated, as recent surveys have failed to find any examples there. The second population is outside the nature reserve at Bukit Batok, partly on private land, and partly on military land. Acidification of the first stream may have caused the first population to die out, while a lowering of the water table in the second stream threatens the second population.

J. singaporensis is one of three freshwater crabs that are endemic to Singapore. The others are Irmengardia johnsoni, and the critically endangered Parathelphusa reticulata.

== Phylogeny ==
The relatives of J. singaporensis in the genus Johora are found across the Straits of Johor on the adjacent Malay Peninsula and some offshore islands, making J. singaporensis the southernmost species in the genus. It probably forms the sister group to a clade comprising J. tiomanensis, J. counsilmani, J. murphyi, J. johorensis, J. gapensis and J. intermedia, from which it separated about 5 million years ago, at a time when the eustatic changes in global sea level may have opened up a land bridge to Singapore.

== Status ==
Johora singaporensis is listed by the International Union for Conservation of Nature as Critically Endangered under criteria B1ab(iii)+2ab(iii), which refer to the small size of the remaining populations and the ongoing deterioration of the habitat. The species' restriction to a single small island is likely to have increased the threat of extinction. In 2012, it was included among the world's 100 most threatened species, in a report by the IUCN Species Survival Commission and the Zoological Society of London.
