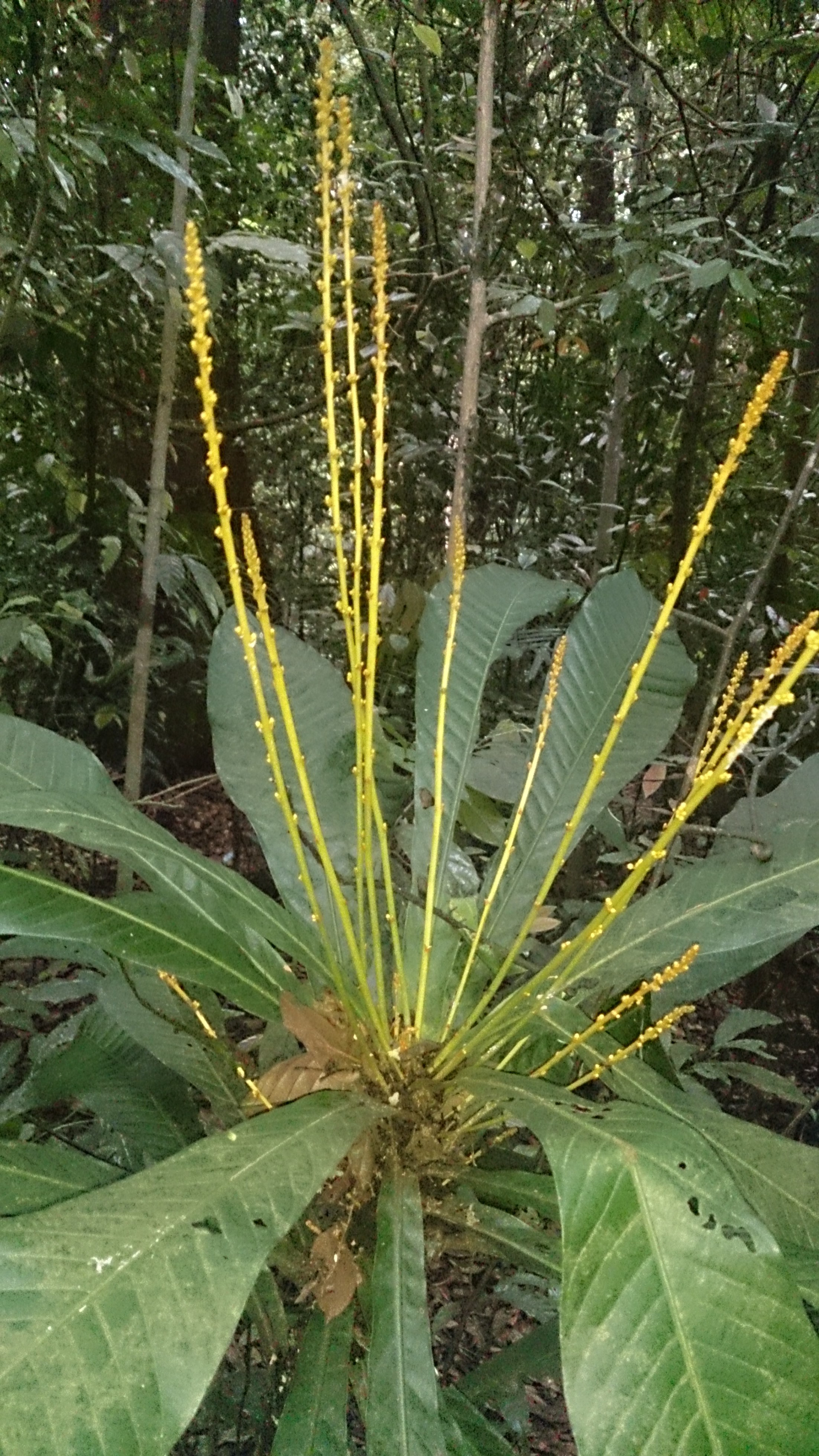

Scientific classification
- Kingdom: Plantae
- Clade: Tracheophytes
- Clade: Angiosperms
- Clade: Eudicots
- Clade: Rosids
- Order: Malpighiales
- Family: Euphorbiaceae
- Genus: Agrostistachys
- Species: A. indica

Binomial name
- Agrostistachys indica Dalzell

Synonyms
- Agrostistachys longifolia (Müll.Arg.) Kurz; Agrostistachys maesoana Vidal; Heterocalyx laoticus Gagnep.

= Agrostistachys indica =

Leaf litter plant

Species of flowering plant

Agrostistachys indica is a species of plant in the family Euphorbiaceae, known in Singapore as the leaf litter plant. The species is widespread across much of Southeast Asia as well as New Guinea, India, and Sri Lanka.

Agrostistachys indica is common in the Bukit Timah Nature Reserve. Its common name comes from the fact that leaf litter that falls from nearby trees often collects at the base of the plant, at the point where the leaves meet the stem.

== Gallery ==
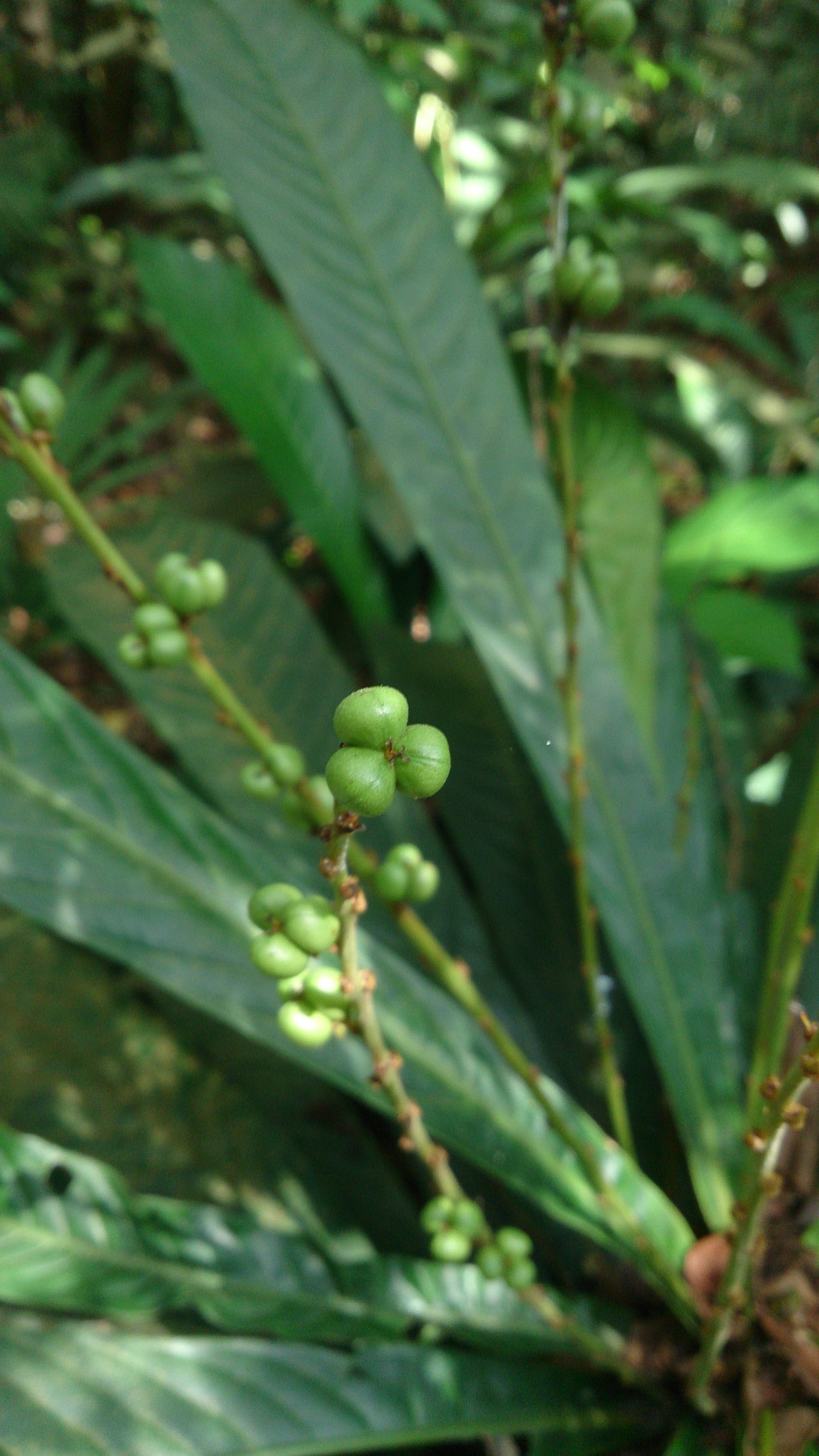

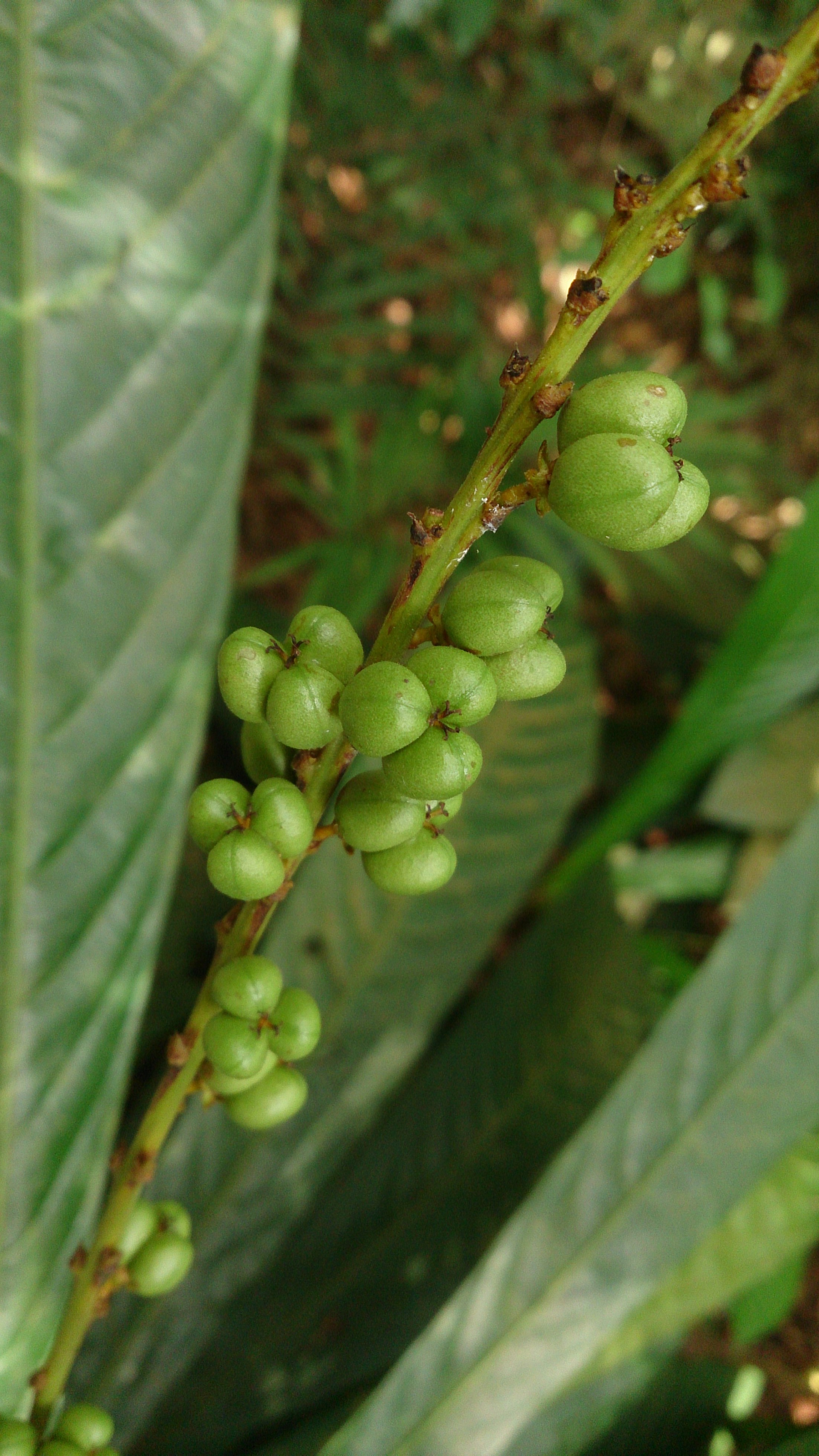
fruits of leaf litter plant

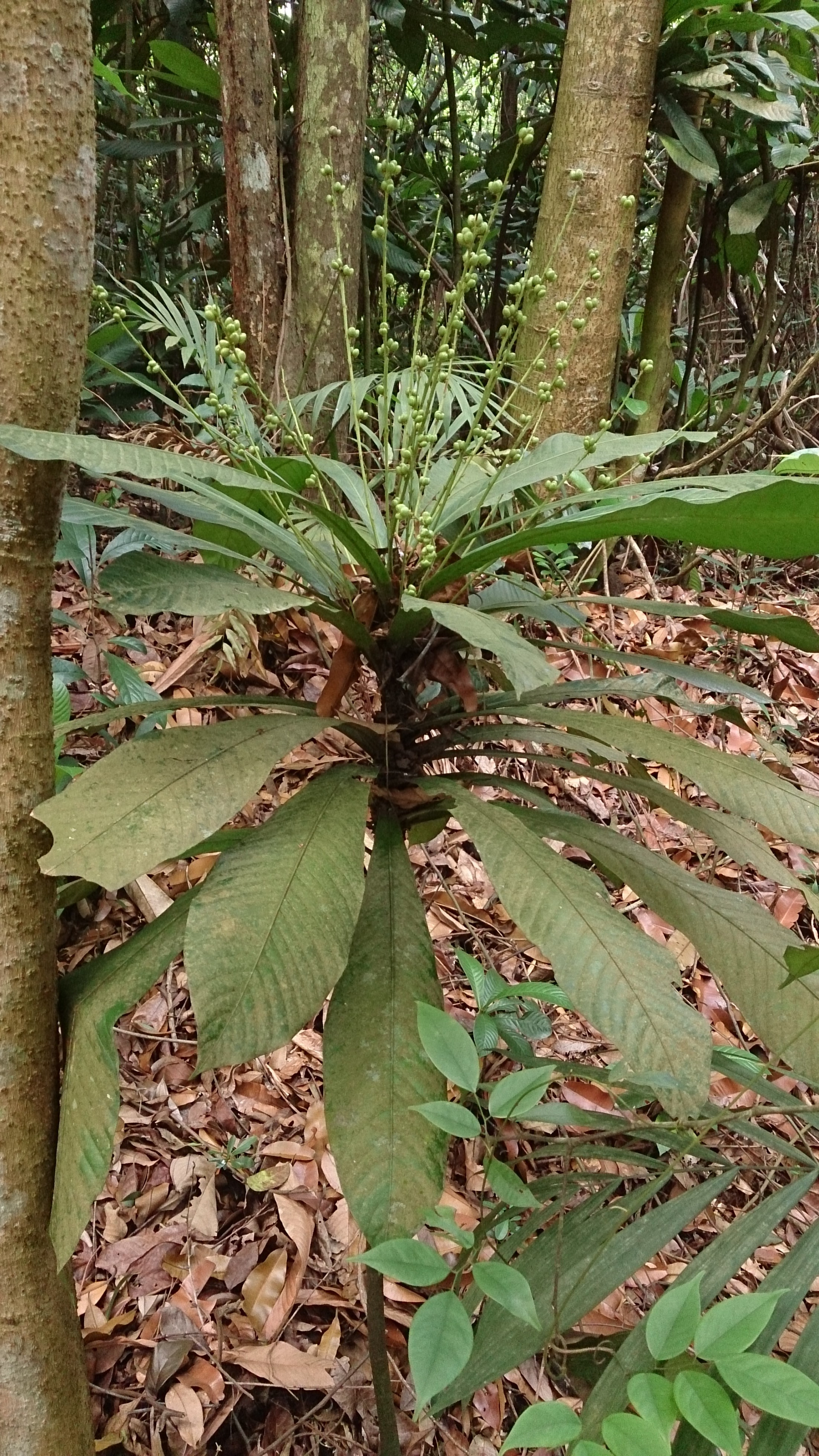

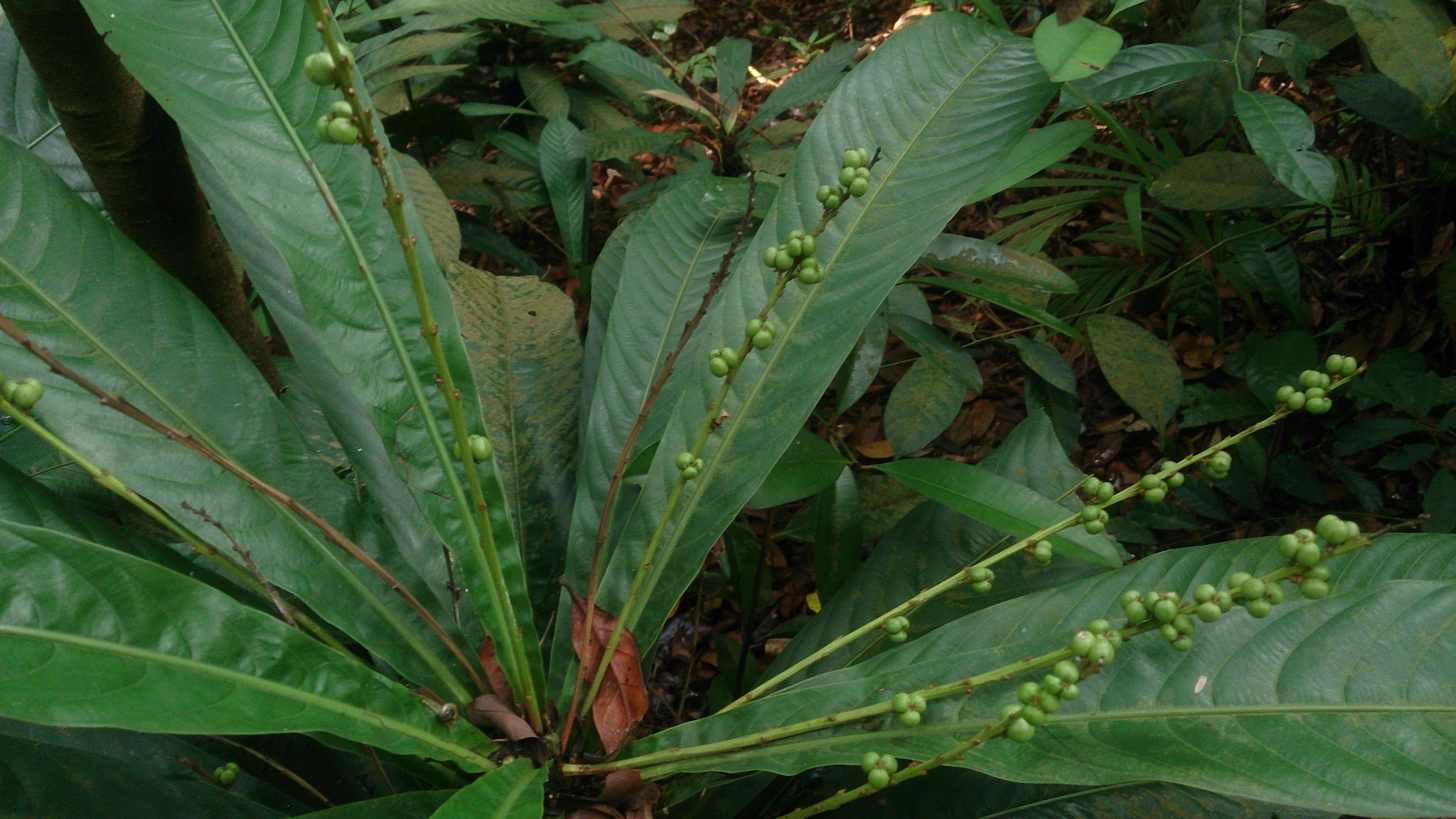
