= Tan Cheng Siong (architect) =

Singaporean architect and urban planner

- Born: 1937
- Citizenship: Singaporean
- Occupation(s): Architect, urban designer
- Known for: Founder of Archurban Architects Planners
- Notable work: Pearl Bank Apartments

Tan Cheng Siong (born 1937) is a Singaporean architect and urban designer.

Tan founded Archynamics Architects in 1967 and then Archurban Architects Planners in 1974. He was the architect behind Singapore's high-rise housing project, the Pearl Bank Apartments, and also designed the one of country's first condominiums, Pandan Valley.

Tan has been an advisor to the Planning Committee of Shenzhen since 1986 and established its first branch office in Shenzhen, in 1994.

His notable achievements include receiving the sixth SIA Gold Medal and the President's Design Award in 2012.
