= Eco-Link@BKE =

Ecological bridge in Singapore

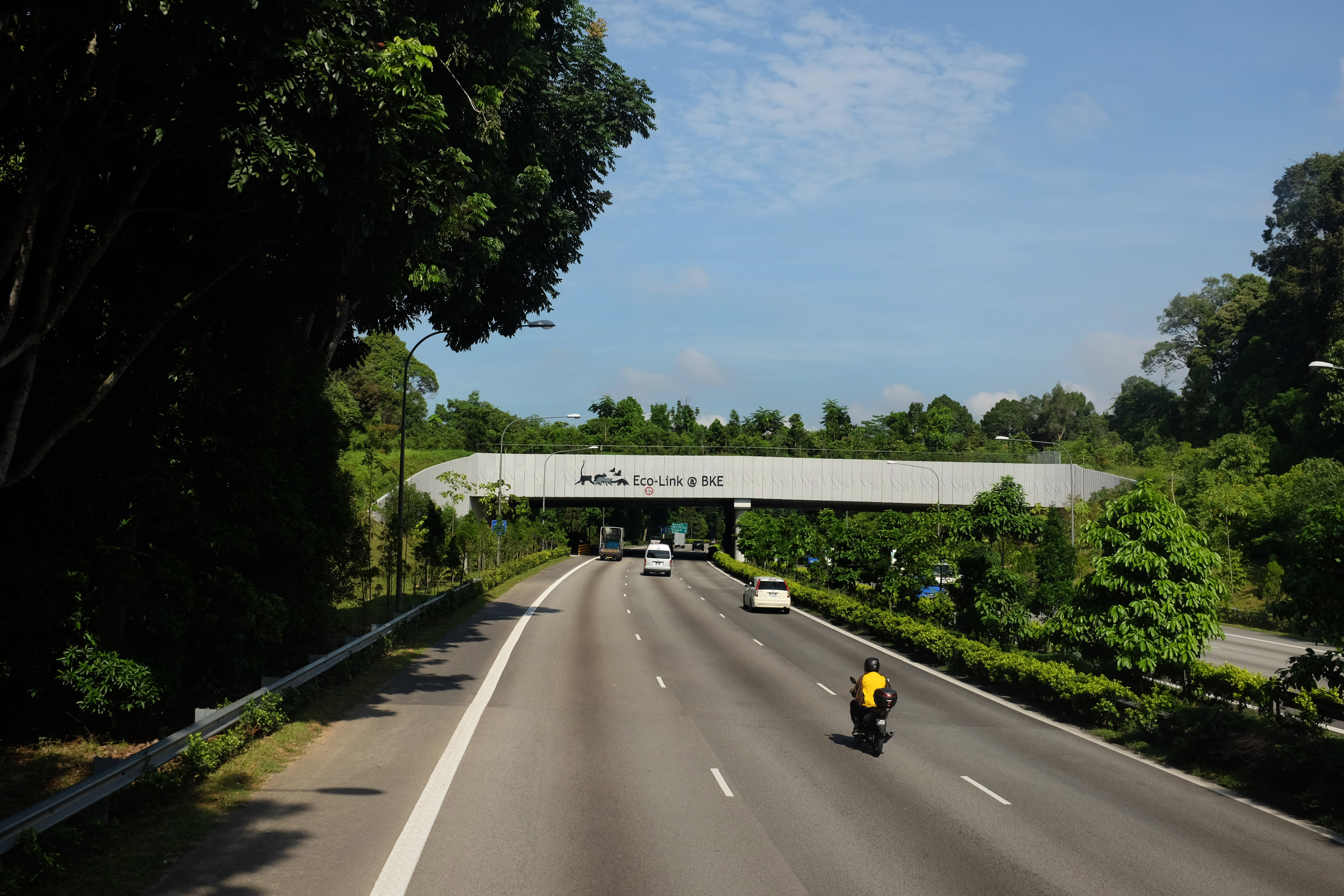
- Interactive map of Eco-Link@BKE
- Type: Ecological bridge
- Coordinates: 1.356661°N 103.78356°E
- Operator: National Parks Board via the Government of Singapore
- Status: Operational
- Website: www.nparks.gov.sg/gardens-parks-and-nature/parks-and-nature-reserves/bukit-timah-nature-reserve/ecolink-bke

The Eco-Link@BKE is an ecological bridge in Singapore which connects the Bukit Timah Nature Reserve with the Central Catchment Nature Reserve.

The Eco-Link is 75 metres (246 ft) long and crosses over the Bukit Timah Expressway (BKE). The bridge is shaped like an hourglass and at its narrowest point is 50 metres (160 ft) wide. Opened in 2012, the Eco-Link is the first such ecological bridge in the Asia-Pacific. The Eco-Link@BKE is intended to aid in wildlife conservation efforts in Singapore.

== Purpose ==
Until the Bukit Timah Expressway was built in 1986, Bukit Timah Nature Reserve and Central Catchment Nature Reserve were connected. The Bukit Timah Expressway severed the connection, leading to a number of negative impacts to the wildlife living in those reserves. Animals who tried to cross the expressway to get from one reserve to the other risked being killed by oncoming cars that often could not stop in time.

For example, between 1994 and 2014, an average of two Sunda pangolins per year were accidentally killed in this manner. The Sunda pangolin is a critically endangered species within Singapore with possibly as few as 75 left in the country around the 2000s. The barrier to movement between the two reserves also inhibited seed dispersal, reducing plant biodiversity, and reduced the available space for animals such as the common palm civet to live in. Also, by isolating populations of animals it reduced the genetic diversity of each population. Eco-Link@BKE was intended to address these issues by creating a safe crossing between the reserves, and allowing expansion of the animals' habitats and gene pools.

== Construction ==
Plans for an Eco-Link began in 1994, and was eventually announced in 2009. Construction began in 2011 and the bridge was completed in 2012. The Eco-Link had cost more than S$10 million to build.

The bridge is covered with native vegetation, including trees and shrubs, which is intended to replicate a native forest ecosystem enticing to the animals. There is a fence on the bridge to prevent certain large animals such as sambar deer and wild boar from crossing into Bukit Timah, which is too small and fragile to sustain them. Camera traps and bat detectors are installed along the bridge to capture photos of animals crossing.

== Usage ==
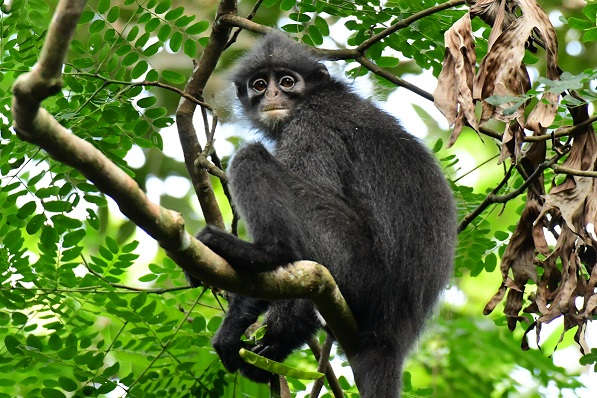
Authorities hope the Eco-Link will enable Raffles' banded langur to expand its range back into Bukit Timah.

Since the Eco-Link was completed, several animals species have been seen using it to cross from one reserve to the other. These include the Sunda pangolin, the common palm civet, the long-tailed macaque, the slender squirrel, the glossy horseshoe bat, the lesser Asiatic yellow bat, the pouched tomb bat, the blue-eared kingfisher and the emerald dove. Between April 2014 and October 2015 no dead pangolins were found near the Bukit Timah Expressway. In 2016, a lesser mouse deer was seen in Bukit Timah. It was believed to have used the Eco-Link since before that the species had only been seen in Central Catchment.

Authorities hope that when the trees mature, Raffles' banded langur monkeys will use the Eco-Link to expand their range into Bukit Timah. Raffles' banded langur is critically endangered in Singapore, with only about 60 individuals remaining, and was eliminated from Bukit Timah in 1987. In 2021, a single langur was seen near Bukit Timah and might have used the Eco-Link to get there. Camera trap footage showed two langurs within the Eco-Link in October 2023. In July 2026 a male Raffles' banded langur was seem in Bukit Timah, although it is not clear if he used Eco-Link to get there. Authorities also hope that the Malayan colugo and red-cheeked flying squirrel will begin using the Eco-Link once the trees mature.

In 2015, the National Parks Board began providing guided walking tours of the Eco-Link. The walks continued through 2016 but were subsequently suspended to avoid potential disturbance to animals using the bridge.

According to Singapore's Second Minister for National Development Desmond Lee, "It is reassuring that the bridge gives (animals) a better chance of survival, and, in fact, to flourish in this highly urbanised Singapore. Because Singapore is not just about concrete, or steel, or glass, or roads, or buildings, it is also about the green spaces that we work very hard and pro-actively to cherish, to protect, and more importantly, to enhance.”

== Successive bridges ==
With the first Eco-Link deemed a success for Singaporean wildlife, the country has decided to build a second Eco-Link structure, known as the Mandai Wildlife Bridge, over Mandai Lake Road. Located close to the Singapore Zoo as well as being a part of the wider Mandai Wildlife Reserve, construction works commenced in June 2017, and the bridge opened on 6 December 2019.

The bridge is also much longer at 140 metres (460 ft) and connects the vegetated areas of the Central Catchment Nature Reserve on either side of the road.
