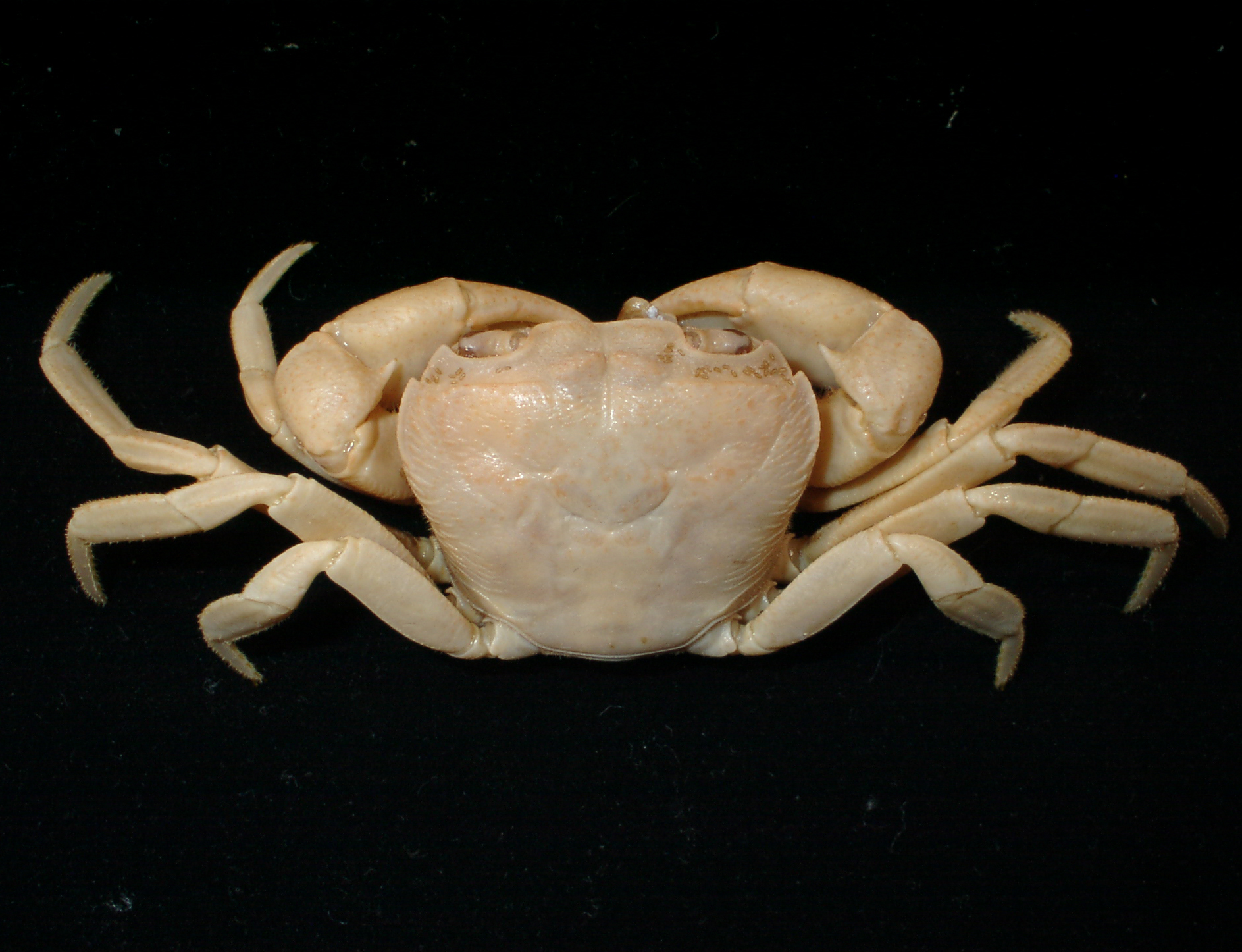
- Johora thaiana

Scientific classification
- Domain: Eukaryota
- Kingdom: Animalia
- Phylum: Arthropoda
- Class: Malacostraca
- Order: Decapoda
- Suborder: Pleocyemata
- Infraorder: Brachyura
- Family: Potamidae
- Genus: Johora; Bott, 1966

Type species
- Potamon johorense Roux, 1936

= Johora =

Genus of crabs

Johora is a genus of freshwater crabs found in the Malay Peninsula and surrounding islands. It includes the following species:

- Johora aipooae (Ng, 1986)
- Johora counsilmani (Ng, 1985)
- Johora gapensis (Bott, 1966)
- Johora grallator Ng, 1988
- Johora gua Yeo, 2001
- Johora hoiseni Ng & Takeda, 1992
- Johora intermedia (Ng, 1986)
- Johora johorensis (Roux, 1936)
- Johora murphyi (Ng, 1986)
- Johora punicea (Ng, 1985)
- Johora singaporensis (Ng, 1986)
- Johora tahanensis (Bott, 1966)
- Johora thaiana Leelawathanagoon, Lheknim & Ng, 2005
- Johora thoi Ng, 1990
- Johora tiomanensis (Ng & L. W. H. Tan, 1984)

Four of the species are listed as vulnerable species by the International Union for Conservation of Nature, one is Near Threatened, one is Data Deficient, and one, Johora singaporensis, is Critically Endangered.
