= Bukit Timah Hill =

Tallest hill in Singapore

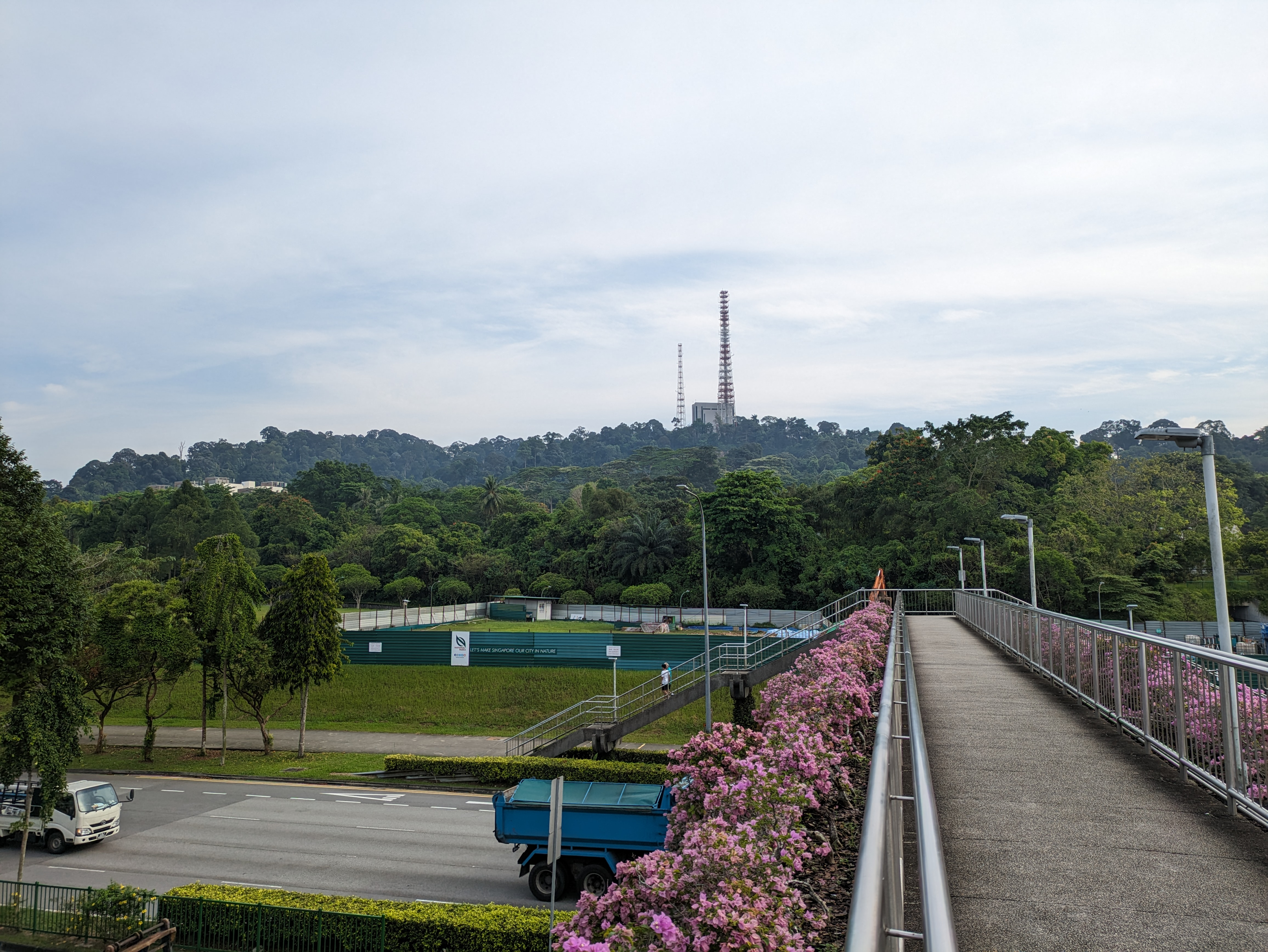

Highest point
- Elevation: 164 m (538 ft)
- Prominence: 164 m (538 ft)
- Listing: Country highest point
- Coordinates: 1°21′17″N 103°46′35″E

Naming
- English translation: "Tin-bearing hill"
- Language of name: Malay; Singapore English

Geography
- Location within Singapore
- Location: Singapore

Geology
- Mountain type: Hill

Bukit Timah Hill is the highest natural peak in Singapore. It is located in Bukit Panjang rather than its namesake district and its altitude is 164 metres (538 feet) above sea level.

== Altitude ==
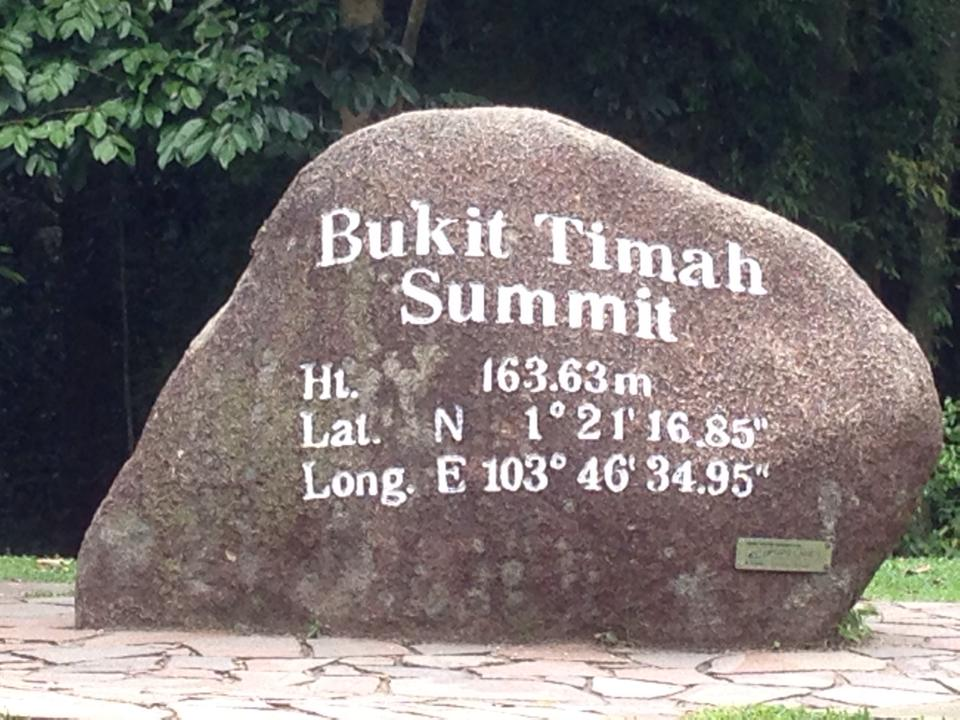
The marker at the summit of Bukit Timah, the highest natural point in Singapore.

The hill's 164-metre (538 ft) altitude makes it the highest natural peak in Singapore. The highest point in Singapore, however, is the 284-metre (932 ft) Guoco Tower, one of scores of buildings taller than the hill.

== Location and accessibility ==
The hill is located in the Nature Reserve subzone of Bukit Panjang rather than its namesake district of Bukit Timah, near the geographical centre of Singapore. It is accessible via Hillview MRT station on the Downtown MRT line. The hill is now protected as part of the Bukit Timah Nature Reserve, which has been classified as an ASEAN Heritage Park. The hill's paved maintenance road (leading to the hill's pair of 60 m (200 ft) VHF steel lattice radio masts built in the 1960s), is not open to the public. Public access is provided by several walking trails. The hill itself is quite steep, with some slopes having a 40 to 50 degree incline.

== Climate ==
Bukit Timah Hill features a tropical rainforest climate (Köppen Af) and has a mix of both wet and dry seasons.

Due to its low to moderate elevation, the weather is slightly cooler than the rest of Singapore and strong winds sometimes occur at the peak. The daily temperature range is between 21–31 °C (70–88 °F).

The dry season runs from April to August, during which, there is generally less rainfall and warmer temperatures. The wet season runs from September to March, during which, there is more frequent rainfall and cooler temperatures.

The average annual rainfall is 2,810 mm (111 in). The average annual daily mean temperature is 26.4 °C (79.5 °F). The coolest month is January, where the average daily mean temperature is 25.6 °C (78.1 °F). The minimum temperature may dip below 20.8 °C (69.4 °F) during rainy days in January. The warmest month is July, with an average daily mean temperature of 28.3 °C (82.9 °F).

== See also ==
- Bukit Timah Nature Reserve
- List of elevation extremes by country
