= List of Dioscorea species =

Dioscorea is a genus of plants in the family Dioscoreaceae. It has a cosmopolitan distribution.

== Species ==
The following 634 species and one hybrid are accepted by Plants of the World Online as of November 2026:

== A ==
- Dioscorea abysmophila Maguire & Steyerm.
- Dioscorea abyssinica Hochst. ex Kunth
- Dioscorea acanthogene Rusby
- Dioscorea acerifolia Phil.
- Dioscorea acuminata Baker
- Dioscorea adenantha Uline
- Dioscorea aesculifolia R.Knuth
- Dioscorea aguilarii Standl. & Steyerm.
- Dioscorea alainii Raz
- Dioscorea alata L.
- Dioscorea alatipes Burkill & H.Perrier
- Dioscorea althaeoides R.Knuth
- Dioscorea amaranthoides C.Presl
- Dioscorea amazonum Mart. ex Griseb.
- Dioscorea amoena R.Knuth
- Dioscorea analalavensis Jum. & H.Perrier
- Dioscorea ancachsensis R.Knuth
- Dioscorea andina Phil.
- Dioscorea andromedusae O.Téllez
- Dioscorea anomala Griseb.
- Dioscorea antaly Jum. & H.Perrier
- Dioscorea antucoana Uline ex R.Knuth
- Dioscorea arachidna Prain & Burkill
- Dioscorea araucana Phil.
- Dioscorea arcuatinervis Hochr.
- Dioscorea argyrogyna Uline ex R.Knuth
- Dioscorea arifolia C.Presl
- Dioscorea aristolochiifolia Poepp.
- Dioscorea asclepiadea Prain & Burkill
- Dioscorea aspera Humb. & Bonpl. ex Willd.
- Dioscorea aspersa Prain & Burkill
- Dioscorea asperula Pedralli
- Dioscorea asteriscus Burkill
- Dioscorea atrescens R.Knuth
- Dioscorea auriculata Poepp.
- Dioscorea ayardei Asesor

== B ==
- Dioscorea bahiensis R.Knuth
- Dioscorea bako Wilkin
- Dioscorea balcanica Košanin
- Dioscorea bancana Prain & Burkill
- Dioscorea banzhuana S.J.Pei & C.T.Ting
- Dioscorea baracoensis (R.Knuth) Raz
- Dioscorea bartlettii C.V.Morton
- Dioscorea basiclavicaulis Rizzini & A.Mattos
- Dioscorea baya De Wild.
- Dioscorea beecheyi R.Knuth
- Dioscorea belophylla (Prain) Voigt ex Haines
- Dioscorea bemandry Jum. & H.Perrier
- Dioscorea bemarivensis Jum. & H.Perrier
- Dioscorea benthamii Prain & Burkill
- Dioscorea berenicea McVaugh
- Dioscorea bermejensis R.Knuth
- Dioscorea bernoulliana Prain & Burkill
- Dioscorea besseriana Kunth
- Dioscorea beyrichii R.Knuth
- Dioscorea bicolor Prain & Burkill
- Dioscorea biformifolia S.J.Pei & C.T.Ting
- Dioscorea biloba (Phil.) Caddick & Wilkin
- Dioscorea biplicata R.Knuth
- Dioscorea birmanica Prain & Burkill
- Dioscorea birschelii Harms ex R.Knuth
- Dioscorea blumei Prain & Burkill
- Dioscorea bolivarensis Steyerm.
- Dioscorea bonii Prain & Burkill
- Dioscorea bosseri Haigh & Wilkin
- Dioscorea brachybotrya Poepp.
- Dioscorea brachystachya Phil.
- Dioscorea bradei R.Knuth
- Dioscorea brandisii Prain & Burkill
- Dioscorea brevipetiolata Prain & Burkill
- Dioscorea brownii Schinz
- Dioscorea bryoniifolia Poepp.
- Dioscorea buchananii Benth.
- Dioscorea buckleyana Wilkin
- Dioscorea bulbifera L.
- Dioscorea bulbotricha Hand.-Mazz.
- Dioscorea burchellii Baker
- Dioscorea burkilliana J.Miège ex R.Hills & Wilkin

== C ==
- Dioscorea cachipuertensis Ayala
- Dioscorea calcicola Prain & Burkill
- Dioscorea caldasensis R.Knuth
- Dioscorea calderillensis R.Knuth
- Dioscorea callacatensis R.Knuth
- Dioscorea cambodiana Prain & Burkill
- Dioscorea campanulata Uline ex R.Knuth
- Dioscorea campestris Griseb.
- Dioscorea campos-portoi R.Knuth
- Dioscorea carionis Prain & Burkill
- Dioscorea carpomaculata O.Téllez & B.G.Schub.
- Dioscorea castilloniana Hauman
- Dioscorea catharinensis R.Knuth
- Dioscorea caucasica Lipsky
- Dioscorea caucensis R.Knuth
- Dioscorea cayenensis Lam.
- Dioscorea cephalocarpa (Uline ex R.Knuth) Raz
- Dioscorea ceratandra Uline
- Dioscorea chagllaensis R.Knuth
- Dioscorea chancayensis R.Knuth
- Dioscorea chaponensis R.Knuth
- Dioscorea chiapasensis Matuda
- Dioscorea chimborazensis R.Knuth
- Dioscorea chingii Prain & Burkill
- Dioscorea chondrocarpa Griseb.
- Dioscorea choriandra Uline ex R.Knuth
- Dioscorea chouardii Gaussen
- Dioscorea chusqueifolia C.Romero, O.Téllez & Bussmann
- Dioscorea cienegensis R.Knuth
- Dioscorea cinnamomifolia Hook.
- Dioscorea cirrhosa Lour.
- Dioscorea cissophylla Phil.
- Dioscorea claussenii Uline ex R.Knuth
- Dioscorea claytonii Ayala
- Dioscorea cochleariapiculata De Wild.
- Dioscorea collettii Hook.f.
- Dioscorea communis (L.) Caddick & Wilkin
- Dioscorea commutata R.Knuth
- Dioscorea comorensis R.Knuth
- Dioscorea compacta D.Araújo
- Dioscorea composita Hemsl.
- Dioscorea contracta R.Knuth
- Dioscorea convolvulacea Schltdl. & Cham.
- Dioscorea conzattii R.Knuth
- Dioscorea cordata (L.) Raz
- Dioscorea cordifolia Laness.
- Dioscorea coreana (Prain & Burkill) R.Knuth
- Dioscorea coriacea Humb. & Bonpl. ex Willd.
- Dioscorea coronata Hauman
- Dioscorea cotinifolia Kunth
- Dioscorea craibiana Prain & Burkill
- Dioscorea crateriflora R.Knuth
- Dioscorea cretica (L.) M.Campos, Wilkin & Viruel
- Dioscorea crotalariifolia Uline
- Dioscorea cruzensis R.Knuth
- Dioscorea cubensis R.Knuth
- Dioscorea cumingii Prain & Burkill
- Dioscorea curitybensis R.Knuth
- Dioscorea cuspidata Humb. & Bonpl. ex Willd.
- Dioscorea cuyabensis R.Knuth
- Dioscorea cyanisticta J.D.Sm.
- Dioscorea cymosula Hemsl.
- Dioscorea cyphocarpa C.B.Rob. ex Knuth

== D-F ==
- Dioscorea daunea Prain & Burkill
- Dioscorea davidsei O.Téllez
- Dioscorea debilis Uline ex R.Knuth
- Dioscorea decaryana H.Perrier
- Dioscorea decipiens Hook.f.
- Dioscorea decorticans C.Presl
- Dioscorea deflexa Griseb.
- Dioscorea delavayi Franch.
- Dioscorea delicata R.Knuth
- Dioscorea deltoidea Wall. ex Griseb.
- Dioscorea demourae Uline ex R.Knuth
- Dioscorea dendrotricha Uline
- Dioscorea densiflora Hemsl.
- Dioscorea depauperata Prain & Burkill
- Dioscorea diamantinensis R.Knuth
- Dioscorea dicranandra Donn.Sm.
- Dioscorea dielsii R.Knuth
- Dioscorea dissimulans Prain & Burkill
- Dioscorea divaricata Blanco
- Dioscorea diversifolia Griseb.
- Dioscorea dodecaneura Vell.
- Dioscorea dregeana (Kunth) T.Durand & Schinz
- Dioscorea dugesii C.B.Rob.
- Dioscorea dumetorum (Kunth) Pax
- Dioscorea dumetosa Uline ex R.Knuth
- Dioscorea edulis (Lowe) M.Campos, Wilkin & Viruel
- Dioscorea elegans Ridl. ex Prain & Burkill
- Dioscorea elephantipes (L'Hér.) Engl.
- Dioscorea entomophila Hauman
- Dioscorea epistephioides Taub.
- Dioscorea escuintlensis Matuda
- Dioscorea esculenta (Lour.) Burkill
- Dioscorea esquirolii Prain & Burkill
- Dioscorea exalata C.T.Ting & M.C.Chang
- Dioscorea fandra H.Perrier
- Dioscorea fasciculocongesta (Sosa & B.G.Schub.) O.Téllez
- Dioscorea fastigiata Gay
- Dioscorea fendleri R.Knuth
- Dioscorea ferreyrae Ayala
- Dioscorea filiformis Blume
- Dioscorea flabellifolia Prain & Burkill
- Dioscorea flabellispina R.Couto & J.M.A.Braga
- Dioscorea flaccida R.Knuth
- Dioscorea flexuosa (Poir.) C.A.Zanotti & Zuloaga
- Dioscorea floribunda M.Martens & Galeotti
- Dioscorea floridana Bartlett
- Dioscorea fodinarum Kunth
- Dioscorea fordii Prain & Burkill
- Dioscorea formosana R.Knuth
- Dioscorea fractiflexa R.Knuth
- Dioscorea fuliginosa R.Knuth
- Dioscorea furcata Griseb.
- Dioscorea futschauensis Uline ex R.Knuth

== G-H ==
- Dioscorea galeottiana Kunth
- Dioscorea galiiflora R.Knuth
- Dioscorea gallegosii Matuda
- Dioscorea garrettii Prain & Burkill
- Dioscorea gaumeri R.Knuth
- Dioscorea gentryi O.Téllez
- Dioscorea gillettii Milne-Redh.
- Dioscorea glabra Roxb.
- Dioscorea glandulosa (Griseb.) Klotzsch ex Kunth
- Dioscorea glauca Rusby
- Dioscorea glomerulata Hauman
- Dioscorea gomez-pompae O.Téllez
- Dioscorea gracilicaulis R.Knuth
- Dioscorea gracilipes Prain & Burkill
- Dioscorea gracilis Hook. ex Poepp.
- Dioscorea gracillima Miq.
- Dioscorea grandiflora Mart. ex Griseb.
- Dioscorea grandis R.Knuth
- Dioscorea grata Prain & Burkill
- Dioscorea gribinguiensis Baudon
- Dioscorea grisebachii Kunth
- Dioscorea guerrerensis R.Knuth
- Dioscorea guianensis R.Knuth
- Dioscorea haenkeana C.Presl
- Dioscorea haitiensis R.Knuth
- Dioscorea hamiltonii Hook.f.
- Dioscorea hassleriana Chodat
- Dioscorea hastata Mill.
- Dioscorea hastatissima Rusby
- Dioscorea hastifolia Nees
- Dioscorea hastiformis R.Knuth
- Dioscorea haumanii Xifreda
- Dioscorea havilandii Prain & Burkill
- Dioscorea hebridensis R.Knuth
- Dioscorea hemicrypta Burkill
- Dioscorea hemsleyi Prain & Burkill
- Dioscorea heptaneura Vell.
- Dioscorea herbert-smithii Rusby
- Dioscorea heteropoda Baker
- Dioscorea hexagona Baker
- Dioscorea hieronymi Uline ex R.Knuth
- Dioscorea hintonii R.Knuth
- Dioscorea hirtiflora Benth.
- Dioscorea hispida Dennst.
- Dioscorea holmioidea Maury
- Dioscorea hombuka H.Perrier
- Dioscorea hondurensis R.Knuth
- Dioscorea howardiana O.Téllez, B.G.Schub. & Geeta
- Dioscorea humifusa Poepp.
- Dioscorea humilis Bertero ex Colla
- Dioscorea hunzikeri Xifreda
- Dioscorea hurteri R.Hills & Wilkin
- Dioscorea hyalinomarginata Raz

== I-L ==
- Dioscorea igualamontana Matuda
- Dioscorea incayensis R.Knuth
- Dioscorea inopinata Prain & Burkill
- Dioscorea insignis C.V.Morton & B.G.Schub.
- Dioscorea intermedia Thwaites
- Dioscorea introrsa Raz
- Dioscorea ionophylla Uline ex R.Knuth
- Dioscorea iquitosensis R.Knuth
- Dioscorea irodensis Wilkin, Rajaonah & Randriamb.
- Dioscorea irupanensis R.Knuth
- Dioscorea itapirensis R.Knuth
- Dioscorea itatiensis R.Knuth
- Dioscorea jaliscana S.Watson
- Dioscorea jamesonii R.Knuth
- Dioscorea japonica Thunb.
- Dioscorea javariensis Ayala
- Dioscorea juxtlahuacensis (O.Téllez & Dávila) Caddick & Wilkin
- Dioscorea kalkapershadii Prain & Burkill
- Dioscorea kamoonensis Kunth
- Dioscorea keduensis Burkill ex Backer
- Dioscorea kerrii Prain & Burkill
- Dioscorea killipii R.Knuth
- Dioscorea kimiae Wilkin
- Dioscorea kingii R.Knuth
- Dioscorea kituiensis Wilkin & Muasya
- Dioscorea kjellbergii R.Knuth
- Dioscorea knuthiana De Wild.
- Dioscorea koepperi Standl.
- Dioscorea koyamae Jayas.
- Dioscorea kratica Prain & Burkill
- Dioscorea kuntzei Uline ex Kuntze
- Dioscorea lacerdaei Griseb.
- Dioscorea laevis Uline
- Dioscorea lamprocaula Prain & Burkill
- Dioscorea lanata Balf.f
- Dioscorea laurifolia Wall. ex Hook.f.
- Dioscorea lawrancei R.Knuth
- Dioscorea laxiflora Mart. ex Griseb.
- Dioscorea lehmannii Uline
- Dioscorea lepcharum Prain & Burkill
- Dioscorea lepida C.V.Morton
- Dioscorea leptobotrys Uline ex R.Knuth
- Dioscorea liebmannii Uline
- Dioscorea lijiangensis C.L.Long & H.Li
- Dioscorea linearicordata Prain & Burkill
- Dioscorea lisae Dorr & Stergios
- Dioscorea listeri Prain & Burkill
- Dioscorea litoralis Phil.
- Dioscorea loefgrenii R.Knuth
- Dioscorea loheri Prain & Burkill
- Dioscorea longicuspis R.Knuth
- Dioscorea longipedicellata Hoque, Lakshmin. & D.Maity
- Dioscorea longipes Phil.
- Dioscorea longirhiza Caddick & Wilkin
- Dioscorea longituba Uline
- Dioscorea lundii Uline ex R.Knuth
- Dioscorea luzonensis Schauer

== M ==
- Dioscorea macbrideana R.Knuth
- Dioscorea maciba Jum. & H.Perrier
- Dioscorea macrantha Uline ex R.Knuth
- Dioscorea macrothyrsa Uline
- Dioscorea macvaughii B.G.Schub.
- Dioscorea madecassa H.Perrier
- Dioscorea madiunensis Prain & Burkill
- Dioscorea magnibracteata T.Clayton ex R.Couto & Cornejo
- Dioscorea maianthemoides Uline ex R.Knuth
- Dioscorea mamillata Jum. & H.Perrier
- Dioscorea mangenotiana J.Miège
- Dioscorea mantigueirensis R.Knuth
- Dioscorea margarethia G.M.Barroso, E.F.Guim. & Sucre
- Dioscorea marginata Griseb.
- Dioscorea martensis R.Knuth
- Dioscorea martiana Griseb.
- Dioscorea martini Prain & Burkill
- Dioscorea matagalpensis Uline
- Dioscorea matudae O.Téllez & B.G.Schub.
- Dioscorea mayottensis Wilkin
- Dioscorea medusae F.Fraga, R.Couto & J.M.A.Braga
- Dioscorea megacarpa Gleason
- Dioscorea megalantha Griseb.
- Dioscorea megaphylla Ram.-Amezcua, O.Téllez & V.W.Steinm.
- Dioscorea melanophyma Prain & Burkill
- Dioscorea melastomatifolia Uline ex Prain
- Dioscorea membranacea Pierre ex Prain & Burkill
- Dioscorea menglaensis H.Li
- Dioscorea meridensis Kunth
- Dioscorea merrillii Prain & Burkill
- Dioscorea mesoamericana O.Téllez & Mart.-Rodr.
- Dioscorea mexicana Scheidw.
- Dioscorea microbotrya Griseb.
- Dioscorea microcephala Uline
- Dioscorea microflora Raz
- Dioscorea microphylla (Kunth) Greuter, J.Pérez & Raz
- Dioscorea microura R.Knuth
- Dioscorea mindanaensis R.Knuth
- Dioscorea minima C.B.Rob. & Seaton
- Dioscorea minutiflora Engl.
- Dioscorea mitis C.V.Morton
- Dioscorea mitoensis R.Knuth
- Dioscorea modesta Phil.
- Dioscorea mollis Kunth
- Dioscorea monadelpha (Kunth) Griseb.
- Dioscorea × monandra Hauman
- Dioscorea morelosana (Uline) Matuda
- Dioscorea moritziana (Kunth) R.Knuth
- Dioscorea mosqueirensis R.Knuth
- Dioscorea moultonii Prain & Burkill
- Dioscorea moyobambensis R.Knuth
- Dioscorea mucronata Uline ex R.Knuth
- Dioscorea multiflora Mart. ex Griseb.
- Dioscorea multiloba Kunth
- Dioscorea multinervis Benth.
- Dioscorea multispicata R.Knuth
- Dioscorea mundii Baker

== N-O ==
- Dioscorea nako H.Perrier
- Dioscorea namorokensis Wilkin
- Dioscorea nana Poepp.
- Dioscorea nanlaensis H.Li
- Dioscorea natalia Hammel
- Dioscorea neblinensis Maguire & Steyerm.
- Dioscorea nelsonii Uline ex R.Knuth
- Dioscorea nematodes Uline ex R.Knuth
- Dioscorea nervata R.Knuth
- Dioscorea nervosa Phil.
- Dioscorea nicolasensis R.Knuth
- Dioscorea nieuwenhuisii Prain & Burkill
- Dioscorea nipensis R.A.Howard
- Dioscorea nipponica Makino
- Dioscorea nitens Prain & Burkill
- Dioscorea nuda R.Knuth
- Dioscorea nummularia Lam.
- Dioscorea nutans R.Knuth
- Dioscorea oaxacensis Uline
- Dioscorea obcuneata Hook.f.
- Dioscorea oblonga Gleason
- Dioscorea oblongifolia Rusby
- Dioscorea obtusifolia Hook. & Arn.
- Dioscorea olfersiana Klotzsch ex Griseb.
- Dioscorea oligophylla Phil.
- Dioscorea omiltemensis O.Téllez
- Dioscorea opaca R.Knuth
- Dioscorea oppositiflora Griseb.
- Dioscorea oppositifolia L.
- Dioscorea orangeana Wilkin
- Dioscorea orbiculata Hook.f.
- Dioscorea oreodoxa B.G.Schub.
- Dioscorea organensis R.Knuth
- Dioscorea orientalis (J.Thiébaut) Caddick & Wilkin
- Dioscorea orizabensis Uline
- Dioscorea orthogoneura Uline ex Hochr.
- Dioscorea oryzetorum Prain & Burkill
- Dioscorea ovalifolia R.Knuth
- Dioscorea ovata Vell.
- Dioscorea ovinala Baker

== P ==
- Dioscorea palawana Prain & Burkill
- Dioscorea paleata Burkill
- Dioscorea pallens Schltdl.
- Dioscorea pallidinervia R.Knuth
- Dioscorea palmeri R.Knuth
- Dioscorea panamensis R.Knuth
- Dioscorea panthaica Prain & Burkill
- Dioscorea pantojensis R.Knuth
- Dioscorea paradoxa Prain & Burkill
- Dioscorea pavonii Uline ex R.Knuth
- Dioscorea pedalis (Uline ex R.Knuth) R.Couto & J.M.A.Braga
- Dioscorea pedicellata Phil.
- Dioscorea pencana Phil.
- Dioscorea pendula Poepp. ex Kunth
- Dioscorea pennellii R.Knuth
- Dioscorea pentaphylla L.
- Dioscorea peperoides Prain & Burkill
- Dioscorea perdicum Taub.
- Dioscorea perenensis R.Knuth
- Dioscorea petelotii Prain & Burkill
- Dioscorea philippiana Uline ex R.Knuth
- Dioscorea piauhyensis R.Knuth
- Dioscorea pierrei Prain & Burkill
- Dioscorea pilcomayensis Hauman
- Dioscorea pilgeriana R.Knuth
- Dioscorea pilifera (Urb.) Raz
- Dioscorea pilosiuscula Bertero ex Spreng.
- Dioscorea pinedensis R.Knuth
- Dioscorea piperifolia Humb. & Bonpl. ex Willd.
- Dioscorea piscatorum Prain & Burkill
- Dioscorea pittieri R.Knuth
- Dioscorea planistipulosa Uline ex R.Knuth
- Dioscorea plantaginifolia R.Knuth
- Dioscorea platycarpa Prain & Burkill
- Dioscorea platycolpota Uline ex B.L.Rob.
- Dioscorea plumifera C.B.Rob.
- Dioscorea pohlii Griseb.
- Dioscorea poilanei Prain & Burkill
- Dioscorea polyclades Hook.f.
- Dioscorea polygonoides Humb. & Bonpl. ex Willd.
- Dioscorea polystachya Turcz.
- Dioscorea pomeroonensis R.Knuth
- Dioscorea porulosa (R.Knuth) Raz
- Dioscorea potarensis R.Knuth
- Dioscorea praehensilis Benth.
- Dioscorea prainiana R.Knuth
- Dioscorea prazeri Prain & Burkill
- Dioscorea preslii Steud.
- Dioscorea preussii Pax
- Dioscorea pringlei C.B.Rob.
- Dioscorea proteiformis H.Perrier
- Dioscorea psammophila R.Knuth
- Dioscorea pseudocleistogama Raz & J.Pérez
- Dioscorea pseudojaponica Hayata
- Dioscorea pseudomacrocapsa G.M.Barroso, E.F.Guim. & Sucre
- Dioscorea pseudorajanioides R.Knuth
- Dioscorea pseudotomentosa Prain & Burkill
- Dioscorea psilostachya (Kunth) Raz
- Dioscorea pteropoda Boivin ex H.Perrier
- Dioscorea pubera Blume
- Dioscorea pubescens Poir.
- Dioscorea pumicicola Uline
- Dioscorea pumilio Griseb.
- Dioscorea puncticulata R.Knuth
- Dioscorea purdiei R.Knuth
- Dioscorea putisensis R.Knuth
- Dioscorea putumayensis R.Knuth
- Dioscorea pynaertii De Wild.
- Dioscorea pyrenaica Bubani & Bordère ex Gren.
- Dioscorea pyrifolia Kunth

== R ==
- Dioscorea quartiniana A.Rich.
- Dioscorea quinquefolia (L.) Raz
- Dioscorea quinquelobata Thunb.
- Dioscorea quispicanchensis R.Knuth
- Dioscorea racemosa (Klotzsch) Mottet
- Dioscorea raziae Greuter & J.Pérez
- Dioscorea regnellii Uline ex R.Knuth
- Dioscorea remota C.V.Morton
- Dioscorea remotiflora Kunth
- Dioscorea reticulata Gay
- Dioscorea retusa Mast.
- Dioscorea reversiflora Uline
- Dioscorea richardhowardii Raz
- Dioscorea ridleyi Prain & Burkill
- Dioscorea riedelii R.Knuth
- Dioscorea rimbachii R.Knuth
- Dioscorea rockii Prain & Burkill
- Dioscorea rosei R.Knuth
- Dioscorea rumicoides Griseb.
- Dioscorea rupicola Kunth
- Dioscorea rusbyi Uline

== S ==
- Dioscorea sabarensis R.Knuth
- Dioscorea sagittata Poir.
- Dioscorea sagittifolia Pax
- Dioscorea salicifolia Blume
- Dioscorea salvadorensis Standl.
- Dioscorea sambiranensis R.Knuth
- Dioscorea sanchez-colinii Matuda
- Dioscorea sandiensis R.Knuth
- Dioscorea sandwithii B.G.Schub.
- Dioscorea sanpaulensis R.Knuth
- Dioscorea sansibarensis Pax
- Dioscorea santanderensis R.Knuth
- Dioscorea santosensis R.Knuth
- Dioscorea sarasinii Uline ex R.Knuth
- Dioscorea saxatilis Poepp.
- Dioscorea scabra Humb. & Bonpl. ex Willd.
- Dioscorea schimperiana Hochst. ex Kunth
- Dioscorea schubertiae Ayala
- Dioscorea schunkei Ayala & T.Clayton
- Dioscorea schwackei Uline ex R.Knuth
- Dioscorea scorpioidea C.Wright
- Dioscorea scortechinii Prain & Burkill
- Dioscorea secunda R.Knuth
- Dioscorea sellowiana Uline ex R.Knuth
- Dioscorea semperflorens Uline
- Dioscorea septemloba Thunb.
- Dioscorea septemnervis Vell.
- Dioscorea sericea R.Knuth
- Dioscorea seriflora Jum. & H.Perrier
- Dioscorea serpenticola Hoque & P.K.Mukh.
- Dioscorea sessiliflora McVaugh
- Dioscorea sexrimata Burkill
- Dioscorea simulans Prain & Burkill
- Dioscorea sinaloensis O.Téllez
- Dioscorea sincorensis R.Knuth
- Dioscorea sinoparviflora C.T.Ting, M.G.Gilbert & Turland
- Dioscorea sinuata Vell.
- Dioscorea sitamiana Prain & Burkill
- Dioscorea skottsbergii R.Knuth
- Dioscorea smilacifolia De Wild. & T.Durand
- Dioscorea sonlaensis R.Knuth
- Dioscorea sororopana Steyerm.
- Dioscorea soso Jum. & H.Perrier
- Dioscorea spectabilis R.Knuth
- Dioscorea sphaeroidea R.Couto & J.M.A.Braga
- Dioscorea spicata B.Heyne ex Roth
- Dioscorea spiculiflora Hemsl.
- Dioscorea spongiosa J.Q.Xi, M.Mizuno & W.L.Zhao
- Dioscorea sprucei Uline ex R.Knuth
- Dioscorea standleyi C.V.Morton
- Dioscorea stegelmanniana R.Knuth
- Dioscorea stellaris R.Knuth
- Dioscorea stemonoides Prain & Burkill
- Dioscorea stenocolpus Phil.
- Dioscorea stenomeriflora Prain & Burkill
- Dioscorea stenopetala Hauman
- Dioscorea stenophylla Uline
- Dioscorea sterilis O.Weber & Wilkin
- Dioscorea stipulosa Uline ex R.Knuth
- Dioscorea strydomiana Wilkin
- Dioscorea subcalva Prain & Burkill
- Dioscorea subhastata Vell.
- Dioscorea sublignosa R.Knuth
- Dioscorea subnigra R.Knuth
- Dioscorea subtomentosa Miranda
- Dioscorea sumatrana Prain & Burkill
- Dioscorea sumiderensis B.G.Schub. & O.Téllez
- Dioscorea suratensis R.Knuth
- Dioscorea sylvatica Eckl.
- Dioscorea synandra Uline
- Dioscorea syringifolia (Kunth) Kunth & R.H.Schomb. ex R.Knuth

== T ==
- Dioscorea tabatae Hatus. ex Yamashita & M.N.Tamura
- Dioscorea tacanensis Lundell
- Dioscorea tamarisciflora Prain & Burkill
- Dioscorea tamoidea Griseb.
- Dioscorea tamshiyacuensis Ayala
- Dioscorea tancitarensis Matuda
- Dioscorea tarijensis R.Knuth
- Dioscorea tarmensis R.Knuth
- Dioscorea tauriglossum R.Knuth
- Dioscorea tayacajensis R.Knuth
- Dioscorea temascaltepecensis R.Knuth
- Dioscorea tenebrosa C.V.Morton
- Dioscorea tenella Phil.
- Dioscorea tentaculigera Prain & Burkill
- Dioscorea tenuifolia Ridl.
- Dioscorea tenuipes Franch. & Sav.
- Dioscorea tenuiphyllum R.Knuth
- Dioscorea tenuis R.Knuth
- Dioscorea ternata Griseb.
- Dioscorea theresensis (Uline ex R.Knuth) Raz
- Dioscorea therezopolensis Uline ex R.Knuth
- Dioscorea togoensis R.Knuth
- Dioscorea tokoro Makino ex Miyabe
- Dioscorea toldosensis R.Knuth
- Dioscorea tomentosa J.Koenig ex Spreng.
- Dioscorea torticaulis R.Knuth
- Dioscorea trachyandra Griseb.
- Dioscorea trachycarpa Kunth
- Dioscorea traillii R.Knuth
- Dioscorea transversa R.Br.
- Dioscorea triandria Sessé & Moc.
- Dioscorea trichantha Baker
- Dioscorea trichanthera Gleason
- Dioscorea trifida L.f.
- Dioscorea trifoliata Kunth
- Dioscorea trifurcata Hauman
- Dioscorea trilinguis Griseb.
- Dioscorea trimenii Prain & Burkill
- Dioscorea trinervia Roxb. ex Prain & Burkill
- Dioscorea trisecta Griseb.
- Dioscorea trollii R.Knuth
- Dioscorea truncata Miq.
- Dioscorea tsaratananensis H.Perrier
- Dioscorea tubiperianthia Matuda
- Dioscorea tubuliflora Uline ex R.Knuth
- Dioscorea tubulosa Griseb.

== U-Z ==
- Dioscorea uliginosa Phil.
- Dioscorea ulinei Greenm. ex R.Knuth
- Dioscorea urceolata Uline
- Dioscorea urophylla Hemsl.
- Dioscorea uruapanensis Matuda
- Dioscorea valdiviensis R.Knuth
- Dioscorea vanvuurenii Prain & Burkill
- Dioscorea variifolia Bertero
- Dioscorea velutipes Prain & Burkill
- Dioscorea vexans Prain & Burkill
- Dioscorea vilis Kunth
- Dioscorea villosa L.
- Dioscorea volckmannii Phil.
- Dioscorea wallichii Hook.f.
- Dioscorea warburgiana Uline ex Prain & Burkill
- Dioscorea warmingii R.Knuth
- Dioscorea wattii Prain & Burkill
- Dioscorea weberbaueri R.Knuth
- Dioscorea widgrenii R.Knuth
- Dioscorea wightii Hook.f.
- Dioscorea wittiana R.Knuth
- Dioscorea wrightii Uline ex R.Knuth
- Dioscorea xizangensis C.T.Ting
- Dioscorea yunnanensis Prain & Burkill
- Dioscorea zentaroana Koidz.
- Dioscorea zingiberensis C.H.Wright
