= List of Dioscoreales of South Africa =

Flowering plants in the order Dioscoreales recorded from South Africa

The Dioscoreales are an order of monocotyledonous flowering plants, Within the monocots Dioscoreales are grouped in the lilioid monocots where they are in a sister group relationship with the Pandanales. As currently circumscribed by phylogenetic analysis using combined morphology and molecular methods, Dioscreales contains many reticulate veined vines in Dioscoraceae, it also includes the myco-heterotrophic Burmanniaceae and the autotrophic Nartheciaceae. The order consists of three families, 22 genera and about 850 species. The anthophytes are a grouping of plant taxa bearing flower-like reproductive structures. They were formerly thought to be a clade comprising plants bearing flower-like structures. The group contained the angiosperms - the extant flowering plants, such as roses and grasses - as well as the Gnetales and the extinct Bennettitales.

23,420 species of vascular plant have been recorded in South Africa, making it the sixth most species-rich country in the world and the most species-rich country on the African continent. Of these, 153 species are considered to be threatened. Nine biomes have been described in South Africa: Fynbos, Succulent Karoo, desert, Nama Karoo, grassland, savanna, Albany thickets, the Indian Ocean coastal belt, and forests.

The 2018 South African National Biodiversity Institute's National Biodiversity Assessment plant checklist lists 35,130 taxa in the phyla Anthocerotophyta (hornworts (6)), Anthophyta (flowering plants (33534)), Bryophyta (mosses (685)), Cycadophyta (cycads (42)), Lycopodiophyta (Lycophytes(45)), Marchantiophyta (liverworts (376)), Pinophyta (conifers (33)), and Pteridophyta (cryptogams (408)).

Three families are represented in the literature. Listed taxa include species, subspecies, varieties, and forms as recorded, some of which have subsequently been allocated to other taxa as synonyms, in which cases the accepted taxon is appended to the listing. Multiple entries under alternative names reflect taxonomic revision over time.

== Burmanniaceae ==
Family: Burmanniaceae,

=== Burmannia ===
Genus Burmannia:

- Burmannia madagascariensis Mart. indigenous

== Dioscoreaceae ==
Family: Dioscoreaceae,

=== Dioscorea ===
Genus Dioscorea:

- Dioscorea brownii Schinz, endemic
- Dioscorea buchananii Benth. subsp. undatiloba (Baker) Wilkin, endemic
- Dioscorea burchellii Baker, endemic
- Dioscorea cotinifolia Kunth, indigenous
- Dioscorea crinita Hook.f. accepted as Dioscorea quartiniana A.Rich. present
- Dioscorea digitaria R.Knuth, accepted as Dioscorea multiloba Kunth, indigenous
- Dioscorea diversifolia Kunth, accepted as Dioscorea multiloba Kunth, indigenous
- Dioscorea dregeana (Kunth) T.Durand & Schinz, indigenous
- Dioscorea elephantipes (L'Her.) Engl. endemic
- Dioscorea hemicrypta Burkill, indigenous
- Dioscorea junodii Burtt Davy, accepted as Dioscorea buchananii Benth. subsp. undatiloba (Baker) Wilkin, indigenous
- Dioscorea microcuspis Baker, accepted as Dioscorea retusa Mast. present
- Dioscorea multiloba Kunth, indigenous
- Dioscorea mundii Baker, endemic
- Dioscorea natalensis R.Knuth, accepted as Dioscorea multiloba Kunth, indigenous
- Dioscorea quartiniana A.Rich. indigenous
- Dioscorea retusa Mast. indigenous
- Dioscorea rupicola Kunth, endemic
- Dioscorea stipulosa Uline ex R.Knuth, endemic
- Dioscorea strydomiana Wilkin, indigenous
- Dioscorea sylvatica Eckl. indigenous
  - Dioscorea sylvatica Eckl. var. brevipes (Burtt Davy) Burkill, indigenous
  - Dioscorea sylvatica Eckl. var. multiflora (Marloth) Burkill, endemic
  - Dioscorea sylvatica Eckl. var. paniculata (Dummer) Burkill, endemic
  - Dioscorea sylvatica Eckl. var. rehmannii (Baker) Burkill, endemic
  - Dioscorea sylvatica Eckl. var. sylvatica, indigenous
- Dioscorea tysonii Baker, accepted as Dioscorea retusa Mast.
- Dioscorea undatiloba Baker, accepted as Dioscorea buchananii Benth. subsp. undatiloba (Baker) Wilkin, endemic

=== Testudinaria ===
Genus Testudinaria:

- Testudinaria montana Burch. accepted as Dioscorea elephantipes (L'Her.) Engl.

== Nartheciaceae ==
Family: Nartheciaceae,

=== Aletris ===
Genus Aletris:

- Aletris bifolia Burm.f. accepted as Lachenalia bulbifera (Cirillo) Engl. indigenous
- Aletris linguiformis Burm.f. accepted as Lachenalia punctata Jacq. indigenous
