= Dioscorea floridana =

Florida yam

Scientific classification
- Kingdom: Plantae
- Clade: Tracheophytes
- Clade: Angiosperms
- Clade: Monocots
- Order: Dioscoreales
- Family: Dioscoreaceae
- Genus: Dioscorea
- Species: D. floridana

Binomial name
- Dioscorea floridana Bartlett

Synonyms
- Dioscorea villosa subsp. floridana (Bartlett) R. Knuth; Dioscorea villosa var. floridana (Bartlett) H.E. Ahles

Species of yam

Dioscorea floridana, the Florida yam, is a plant species native to Florida, Alabama, Georgia and South Carolina. It grows in wet and sandy places at low elevations.

Dioscorea floridana is a perennial vine twining over other vegetation and spreading by means of yellow underground rhizomes. Stems can reach a height of over 4 m off the ground. Leaves are egg-shaped to triangular, up to 12 cm long, not clasping the stem. Flowers are yellow-orange. D. floridana flowers from June to November.

Although not considered to be in any active danger, D. floridana's native range is so limited that it is of conservational interest.
