= Dioscorea sericea =

Conservation status
- Least Concern (IUCN 3.1)

Scientific classification
- Kingdom: Plantae
- Clade: Tracheophytes
- Clade: Angiosperms
- Clade: Monocots
- Order: Dioscoreales
- Family: Dioscoreaceae
- Genus: Dioscorea
- Species: D. sericea

Binomial name
- Dioscorea sericea R.Kunth

Species of herbaceous vine

Dioscorea sericea (common names: wild yam, colic-root, rheumatism-root) is a type of climbing tuberous geophyte in the family Dioscoreaceae. It is native to Colombia and Peru.
