= Dioscorea althaeoides =

Scientific classification
- Kingdom: Plantae
- Clade: Tracheophytes
- Clade: Angiosperms
- Clade: Monocots
- Order: Dioscoreales
- Family: Dioscoreaceae
- Genus: Dioscorea
- Species: D. althaeoides

Binomial name
- Dioscorea althaeoides R.Knuth

Species of herbaceous vine

Dioscorea althaeoides is a herbaceous vine in the genus Dioscorea which is indigenous to the Guizhou, Sichuan, and eastern Xizang provinces of China, in addition to the Yunnan area in Thailand. A formerly unknown acetylated spirostanol saponin, dioscin-6′-O-acetate, has been discovered in the rhizomes of the plant.
