= Dioscorea ancachsensis =

Scientific classification
- Kingdom: Plantae
- Clade: Tracheophytes
- Clade: Angiosperms
- Clade: Monocots
- Order: Dioscoreales
- Family: Dioscoreaceae
- Genus: Dioscorea
- Species: D. ancachsensis

Binomial name
- Dioscorea ancachsensis R.Knuth

Species of herbaceous vine

Dioscorea ancachsensis is a herbaceous plant in the genus Dioscorea that is native to Peru. It is uncertain if these specimens are mature, but they are distinct from most specimens of most Dioscorea species in that they are approximately 5 cm across. One such specimen, collected from an open hillside in Cuzco, includes foliage, flowers, and a tuber and is approximately 4 by 5 cm when pressed.
