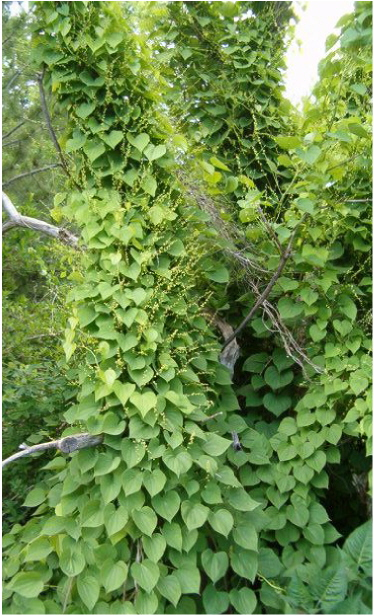

Conservation status
- Near Threatened (IUCN 3.1)

Scientific classification
- Kingdom: Plantae
- Clade: Tracheophytes
- Clade: Angiosperms
- Clade: Monocots
- Order: Dioscoreales
- Family: Dioscoreaceae
- Genus: Dioscorea
- Species: D. balcanica

Binomial name
- Dioscorea balcanica Košanin

= Dioscorea balcanica =

Species of herbaceous vine

Dioscorea balcanica, the Balkan yam, is a herbaceous perennial in the family Dioscoreaceae.

== Description ==
Dioscorea balcanica reaches a height of 2–5 m (7–16 ft). The flowers are cup-shaped, arranged in racemes, and produce loculicidal capsules.

== Taxonomy ==
Dioscorea balcanica was named in 1914 by Nedeljko Košanin (1874–1934), manager of the Jevremovac Botanical Garden in Belgrade, Serbia from 1906 to 1934.

== Distribution ==
Dioscorea balcanica is native to the Balkans, in Serbia, Montenegro, North Macedonia and Albania. It is a relict species and the only wild Dioscorea species found on the Balkan Peninsula where it is endemic. It is considered an endangered species and has been placed under protection.
