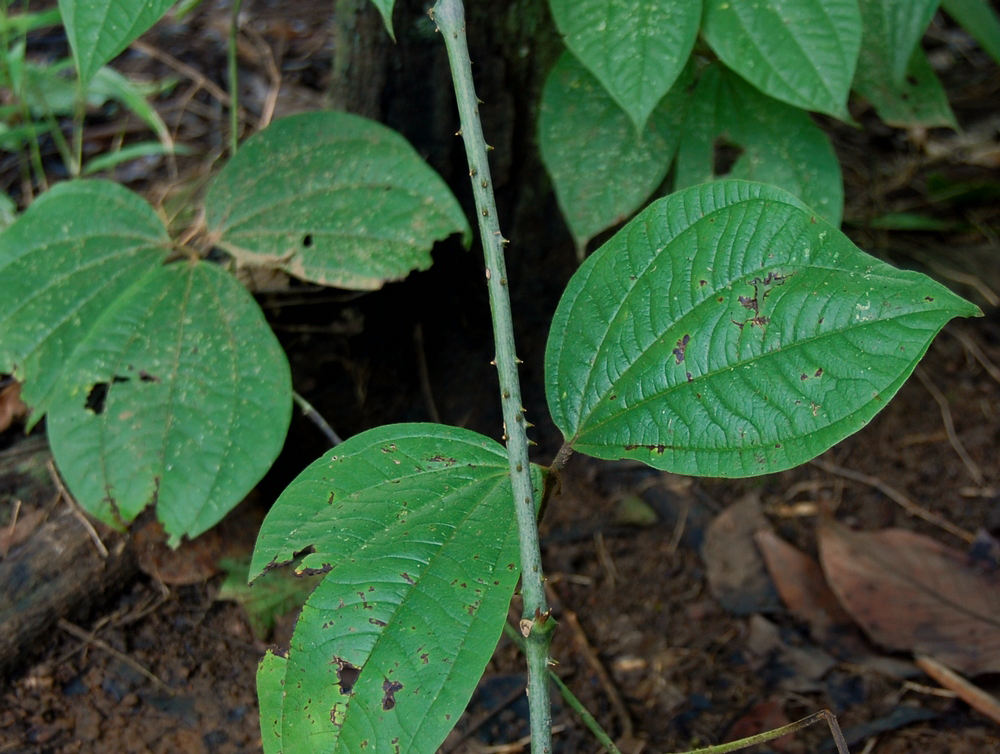

Scientific classification
- Kingdom: Plantae
- Clade: Embryophytes
- Clade: Tracheophytes
- Clade: Spermatophytes
- Clade: Angiosperms
- Clade: Monocots
- Order: Dioscoreales
- Family: Dioscoreaceae
- Genus: Dioscorea
- Species: D. hispida

Binomial name
- Dioscorea hispida Dennst

= Dioscorea hispida =

Species of yam

Dioscorea hispida, also known as the Indian three-leaved yam, (Tagalog: nami, Indonesia: gadung) is a species of yam in the genus Dioscorea, native to South and Southeast Asia. Known to be poisonous when fresh, careful processing is required to render it edible.

== Culinary use ==
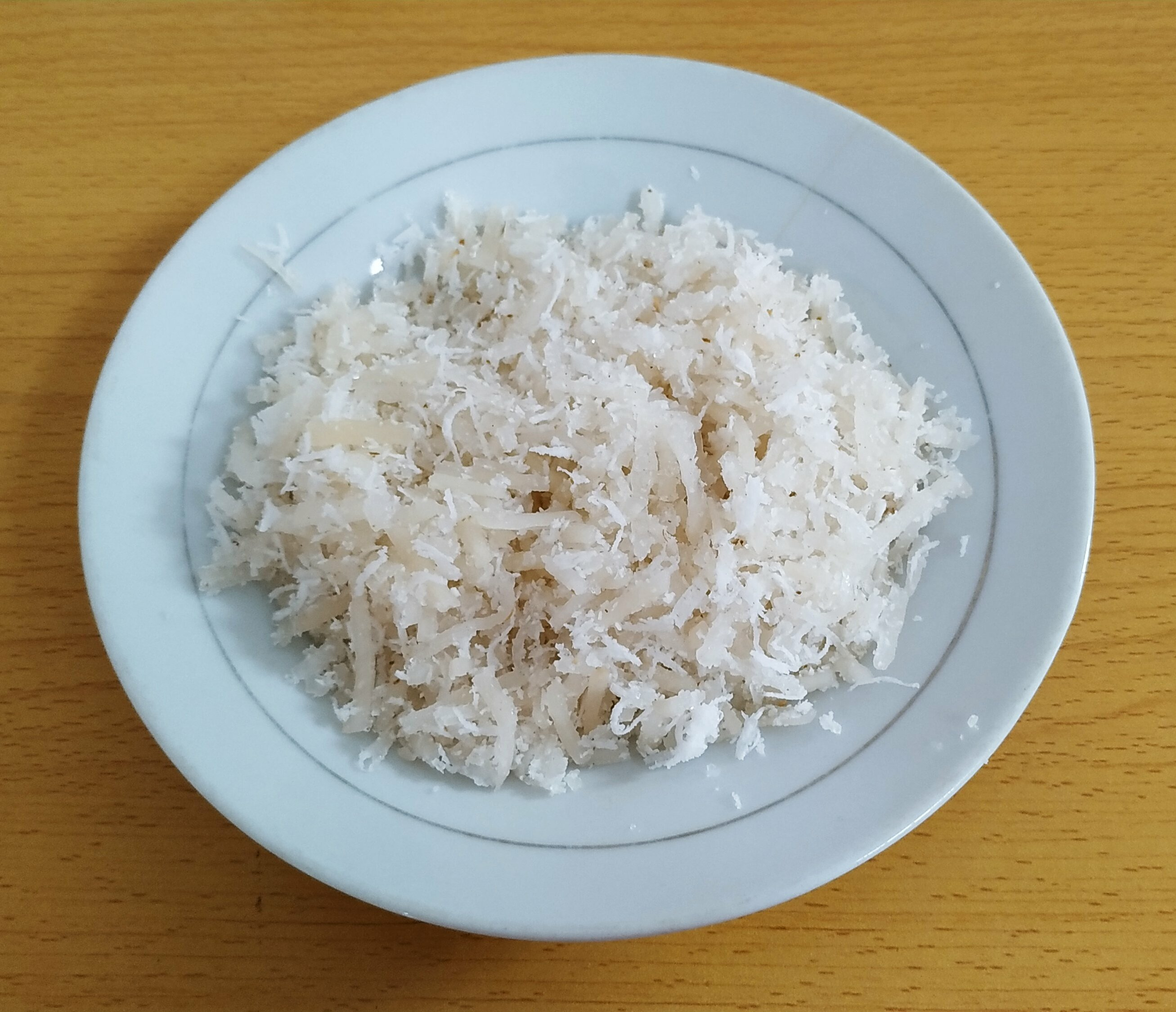
Krabèe janèng, Acehnese food made from Dioscorea hispida

Several peoples use the tuber as food. The tuber is toxic when fresh due to the presence of saponins and calcium oxalate raphides, so it must be processed prior to consumption, typically by finely slicing into thin strips, placing in a sack or net, and leaving in a stream for a few days until the toxins have leached out. It is then dehydrated and cooked.

== Herbal medicine ==
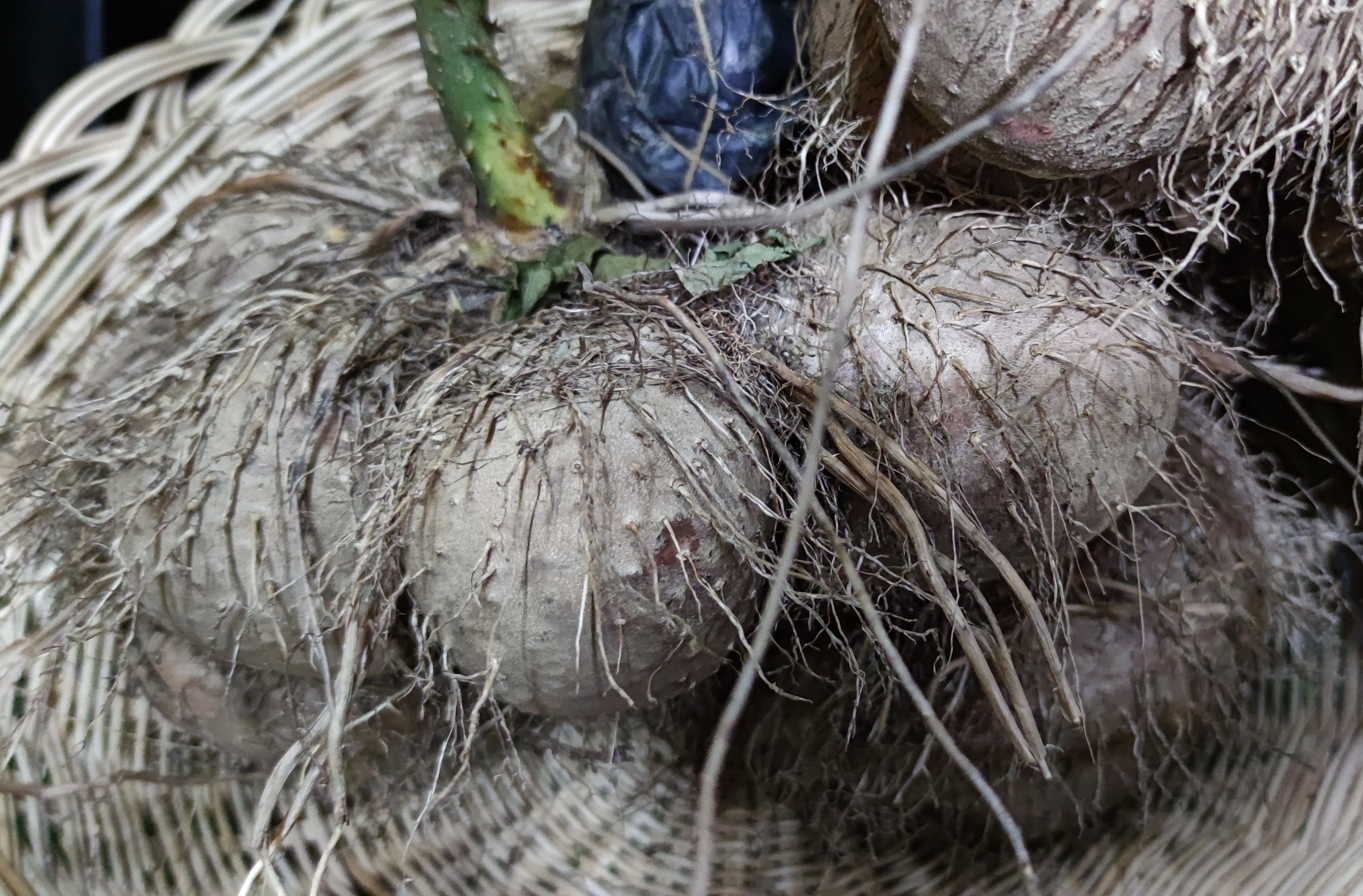
The tuber of Dioscorea hispida

Grated gadung tubers are utilized in Indonesia and China for the treatment of early-stage leprosy, warts, calluses, and fish eyes (Source: [1]). Additionally, the bulbs of the gadung plant are employed in treating wounds caused by syphilis. In Thailand, slices of gadung root are applied to alleviate stomach spasms, colic, and to extract pus from wounds. Furthermore, in the Philippines and China, it is used to provide relief from arthritis and rheumatism, as well as to cleanse wounds on animals.

Dioscorea tubers, the main component of gadung, possess a thick mucilage consisting of water-soluble glycoproteins and polysaccharides. These glycoproteins and polysaccharides serve as water-soluble dietary fiber and function as hydrocolloids. They have demonstrated beneficial effects in reducing blood glucose levels and total cholesterol levels, particularly LDL cholesterol.
