= Dioscorea rosei =

Conservation status
- Vulnerable (IUCN 3.1)

Scientific classification
- Kingdom: Plantae
- Clade: Tracheophytes
- Clade: Angiosperms
- Clade: Monocots
- Order: Dioscoreales
- Family: Dioscoreaceae
- Genus: Dioscorea
- Species: D. rosei

Binomial name
- Dioscorea rosei R.Kunth

Species of herbaceous vine

Dioscorea rosei is a vine in the family Dioscoreaceae. It is endemic to Ecuador and it is threatened by habitat destruction.
