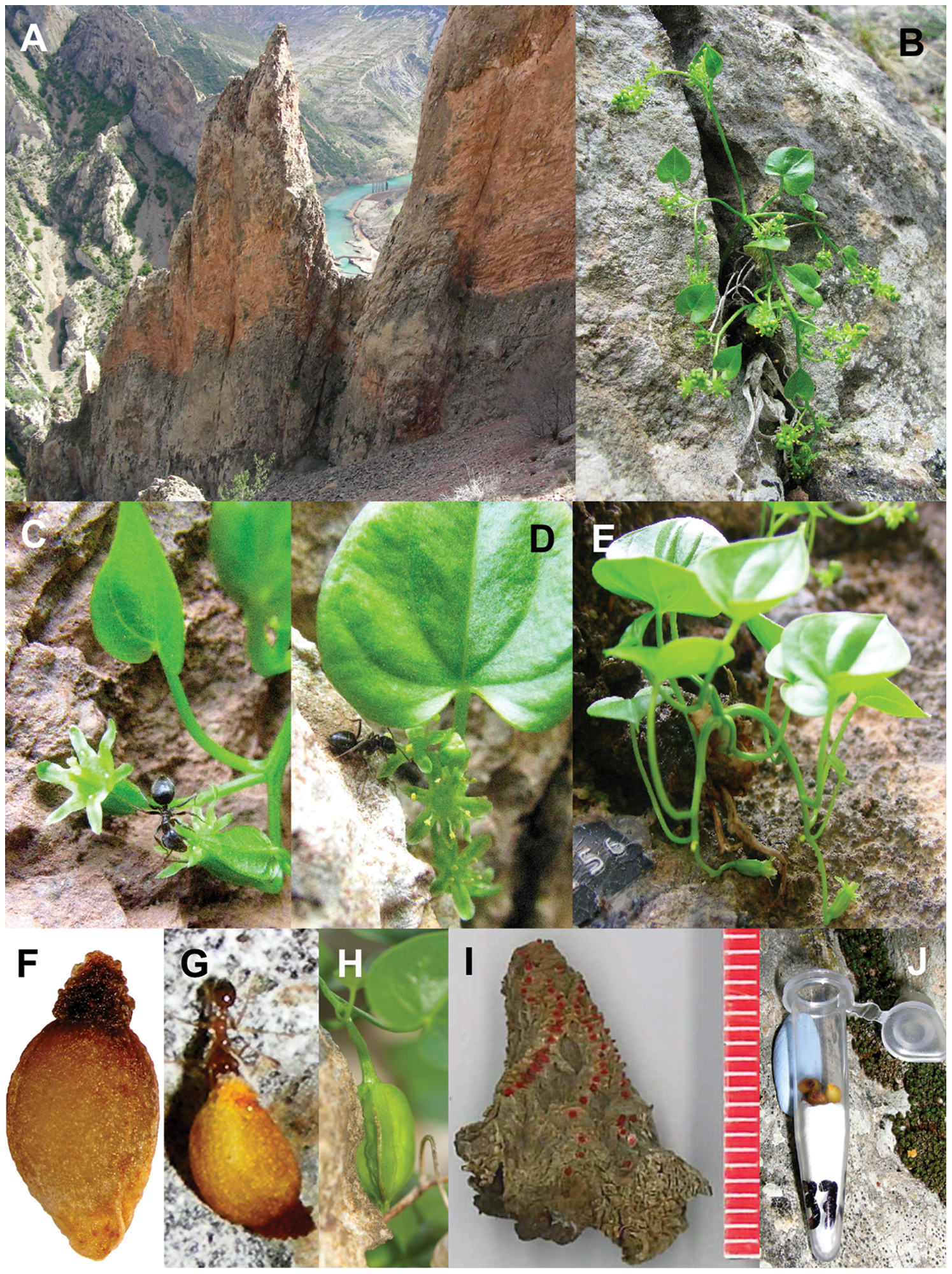

Conservation status
- Critically Endangered (IUCN 3.1)

Scientific classification
- Kingdom: Plantae
- Clade: Tracheophytes
- Clade: Angiosperms
- Clade: Monocots
- Order: Dioscoreales
- Family: Dioscoreaceae
- Genus: Dioscorea
- Species: D. chouardii

Binomial name
- Dioscorea chouardii Gaussen

Synonyms
- Borderea chouardii (Gaussen) Gaussen & Heslot

= Dioscorea chouardii =

Species of herbaceous vine

Dioscorea chouardii (synonym: Borderea chouardii) is a herbaceous plant in the family Dioscoreaceae. It is endemic to a single cliff located in the Pyrenees of Aragon, Spain.

== History ==
A previously unknown species, Dioscorea chouardii was discovered in the 1950s growing in cracks in a limestone cliff in the Pyrenees Mountains in northeastern Spain. The fissures in which it lives are so inaccessible that it proved difficult to estimate the number of plants. At first it was thought that there were some 300 to 500 plants scattered across the rock face, but later, with the erection of some scaffolding and the help of binoculars and telescopes, individual plants could be monitored, and a total figure of around 9,000 plants was reached.

== Taxonomy ==
Dioscorea chouardii was originally separated from Dioscorea, along with its close relative D. pyrenaica, in the genus Borderea on the basis of the seeds lacking the wings of most Dioscorea, although it was pointed out by 2001 that other alpine species recognised as Dioscorea in Africa and South America also had wingless seeds.

== Ecology ==
Dioscorea chouardii is related to the yam and grows from a tuber hidden in the rock fissure. From this it sends out a shoot each year which withers away in the autumn. The shoot leaves a scar on the tuber, which makes it possible to estimate the age of the plant from the number of scars; the oldest plants are calculated to have lived for three hundred years, and may be contenders for being the "slowest growing plants in the world". The plant reproduces by seed, pollination having been performed by ants. When fertilised, the flower-stem bends over to bury the resulting seedhead in the crack, the seeds being released when it dries. This would limit dispersal possibilities for the plant were it not for the fact that the seeds are transported by ants, which distribute them more widely.

Because most Dioscorea are strictly tropical species, this plant is considered to be what is known as a "relict species"; a remnant from the warmer temperatures of the Eocene. Dioscorea chouardii is morphologically very similar to another relict species, D. pyrenaica, which has a rather wider distribution in the Pyrenees. The former grows in vertical cracks on shaded, north-facing limestone cliffs at between 730 and 850 m (2,400 and 2,800 ft) while the latter grows on limestone screes at over 1,800 m (5,900 ft). RAPD testing strongly suggests that D chouardii is not an ecotype of D. pyrenaica and that the two taxa should be considered separate species.

== Conservation status ==
In 1992, under the synonym Borderea chouardii, it was designated as a 'priority species' under Annex II of the Habitats Directive in the European Community, which means areas in which it occurs could be declared Special Areas of Conservation, if these areas belong to one of the number of habitats listed in Annex I of the directive. Pursuantly in the European Union, it is now protected by having seven Natura 2000 sites designated for its protection. The EU has since also officially classified this plant as critically endangered. It has also has been assessed as critically endangered on the IUCN Red List. Although its range is extremely small, the population of this plant seems stable, however, and there is no particular reason why climate change should affect it adversely.
