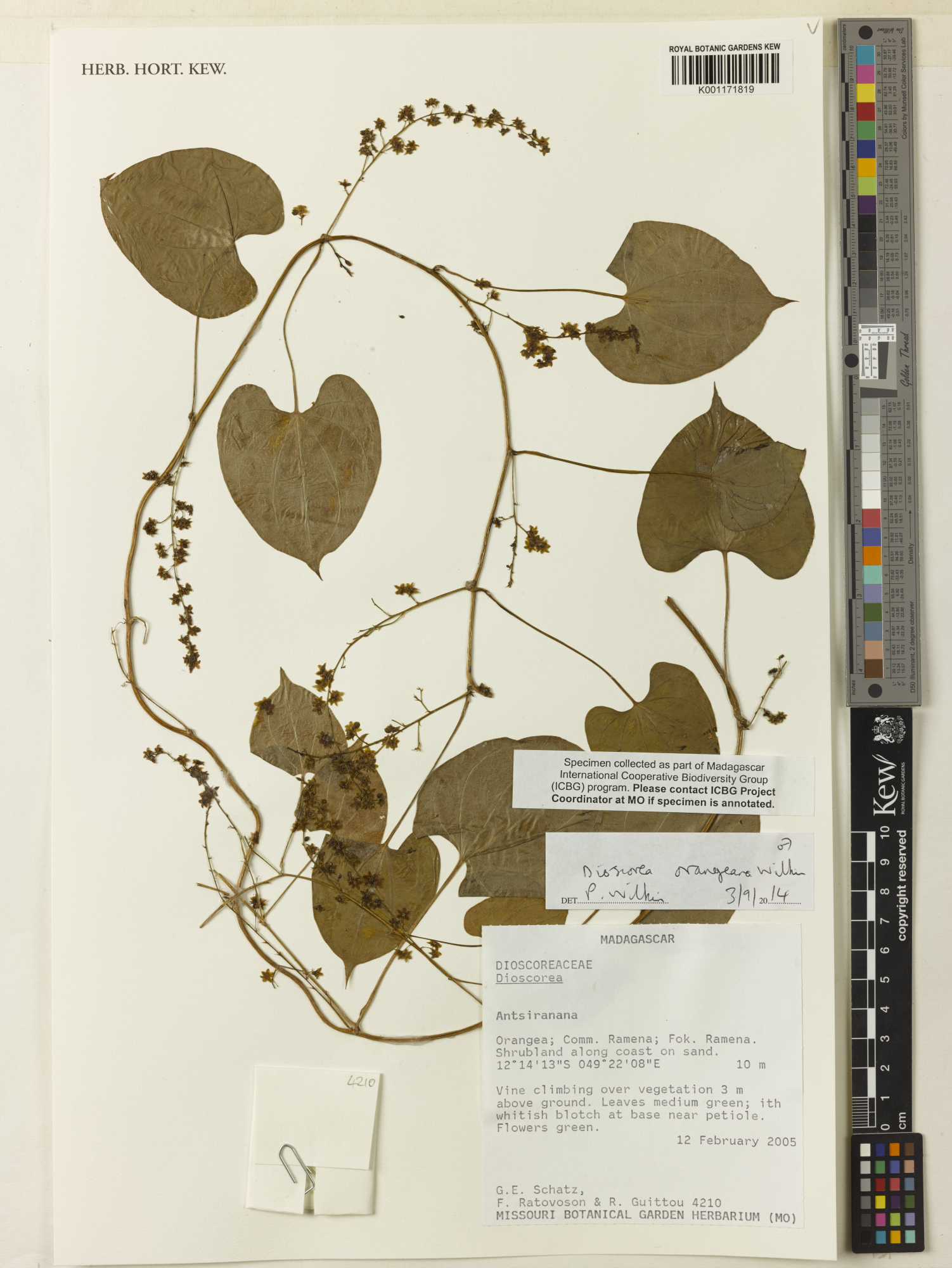
- Dioscorea orangeana herbarium specimen

Conservation status
- Endangered (IUCN 3.1)

Scientific classification
- Kingdom: Plantae
- Clade: Tracheophytes
- Clade: Angiosperms
- Clade: Monocots
- Order: Dioscoreales
- Family: Dioscoreaceae
- Genus: Dioscorea
- Species: D. orangeana

Binomial name
- Dioscorea orangeana Wilkin

= Dioscorea orangeana =

Species of herbaceous vine

Dioscorea orangeana is a tuberous vining flowering plant in the genus Dioscorea, endemic the Forêt d’Orangea near Antsiranana in Madagascar, from which it derives its name. The tuber is possibly edible, and unlike most other Dioscorea species, the tuber has many finger-like lobes as opposed to a single tuber. Because the plant is new to science and the possible harvesting by local populations, the conservation status of Dioscorea orangeana is of great concern.

== Taxonomy ==
Dioscorea orangeana belongs to the genus Dioscorea referring to the plants producing edible roots known as yams.
