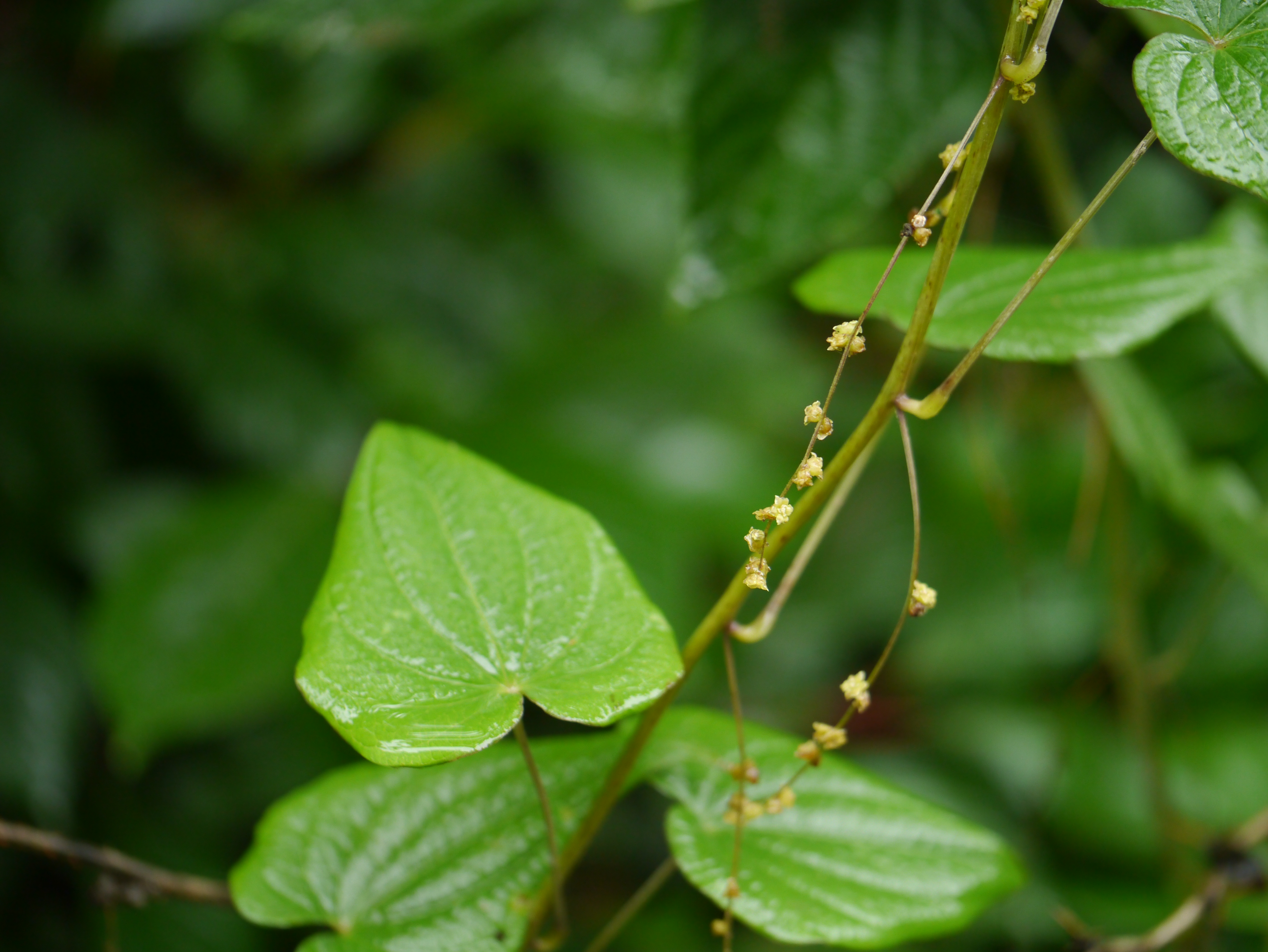
- Inflorescence
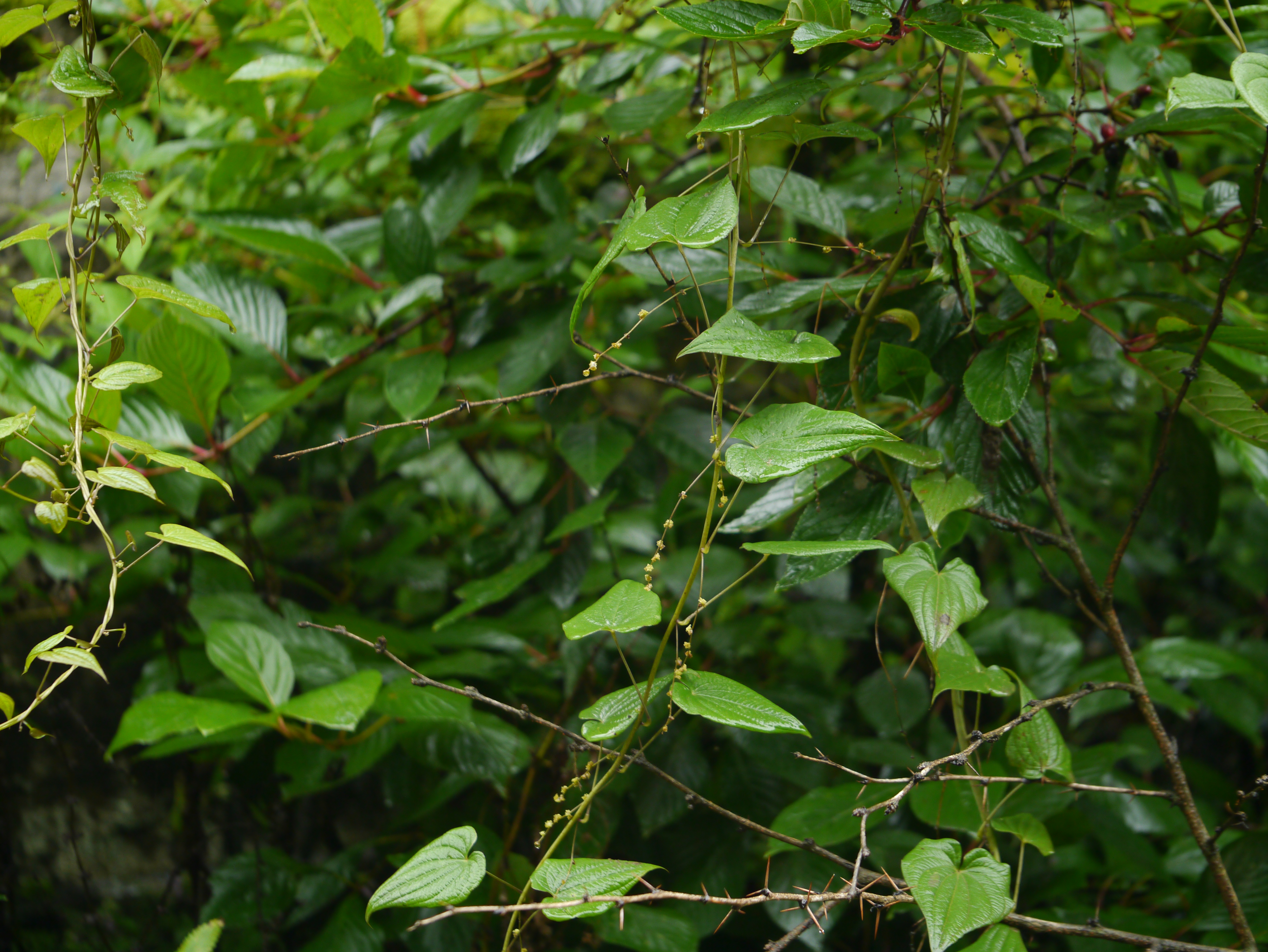
- Twining habit

Scientific classification
- Kingdom: Plantae
- Clade: Tracheophytes
- Clade: Angiosperms
- Clade: Monocots
- Order: Dioscoreales
- Family: Dioscoreaceae
- Genus: Dioscorea
- Species: D. deltoidea

Binomial name
- Dioscorea deltoidea Wall. ex Griseb.

Synonyms
- Dioscorea deltoidea var. orbiculata Prain & Burkill; Dioscorea nepalensis (Jacquem. ex Prain & Burkill) Sweet ex Bernardi; Tamus nepalensis Jacquem. ex Prain & Burkill

= Dioscorea deltoidea =

Species of yam from Asia

Dioscorea deltoidea, the Nepal yam, is a species of flowering plant in the family Dioscoreaceae. Its native range is the Himalayas through to south-central China and mainland Southeast Asia. Its tubers contain diosgenin and are harvested by local peoples as a treatment for a variety of conditions, including gastrointestinal disorders and intestinal worms. Tubers are also eaten after boiling, washing, and baking. It grows in forests and humus-rich soils.
