= Dioscorea pseudomacrocapsa =

Conservation status
- Least Concern (IUCN 3.1)

Scientific classification
- Kingdom: Plantae
- Clade: Tracheophytes
- Clade: Angiosperms
- Clade: Monocots
- Order: Dioscoreales
- Family: Dioscoreaceae
- Genus: Dioscorea
- Species: D. pseudomacrocapsa

Binomial name
- Dioscorea pseudomacrocapsa G.M.Barroso, E.F.Guim. & Sucre

Species of yam

Dioscorea pseudomacrocapsa is a species of yam in the family Dioscoreaceae. It occurs in southeastern Brazil, and grows in tropical rainforests.
