= Dioscorea rimbachii =

Conservation status
- Near Threatened (IUCN 3.1)

Scientific classification
- Kingdom: Plantae
- Clade: Tracheophytes
- Clade: Angiosperms
- Clade: Monocots
- Order: Dioscoreales
- Family: Dioscoreaceae
- Genus: Dioscorea
- Species: D. rimbachii

Binomial name
- Dioscorea rimbachii R.Kunth

Species of herbaceous vine

Dioscorea rimbachii is a species in the family Dioscoreaceae. It is endemic to Ecuador, in which it grows from altitudes of 2,000 to 4,000 meters.
