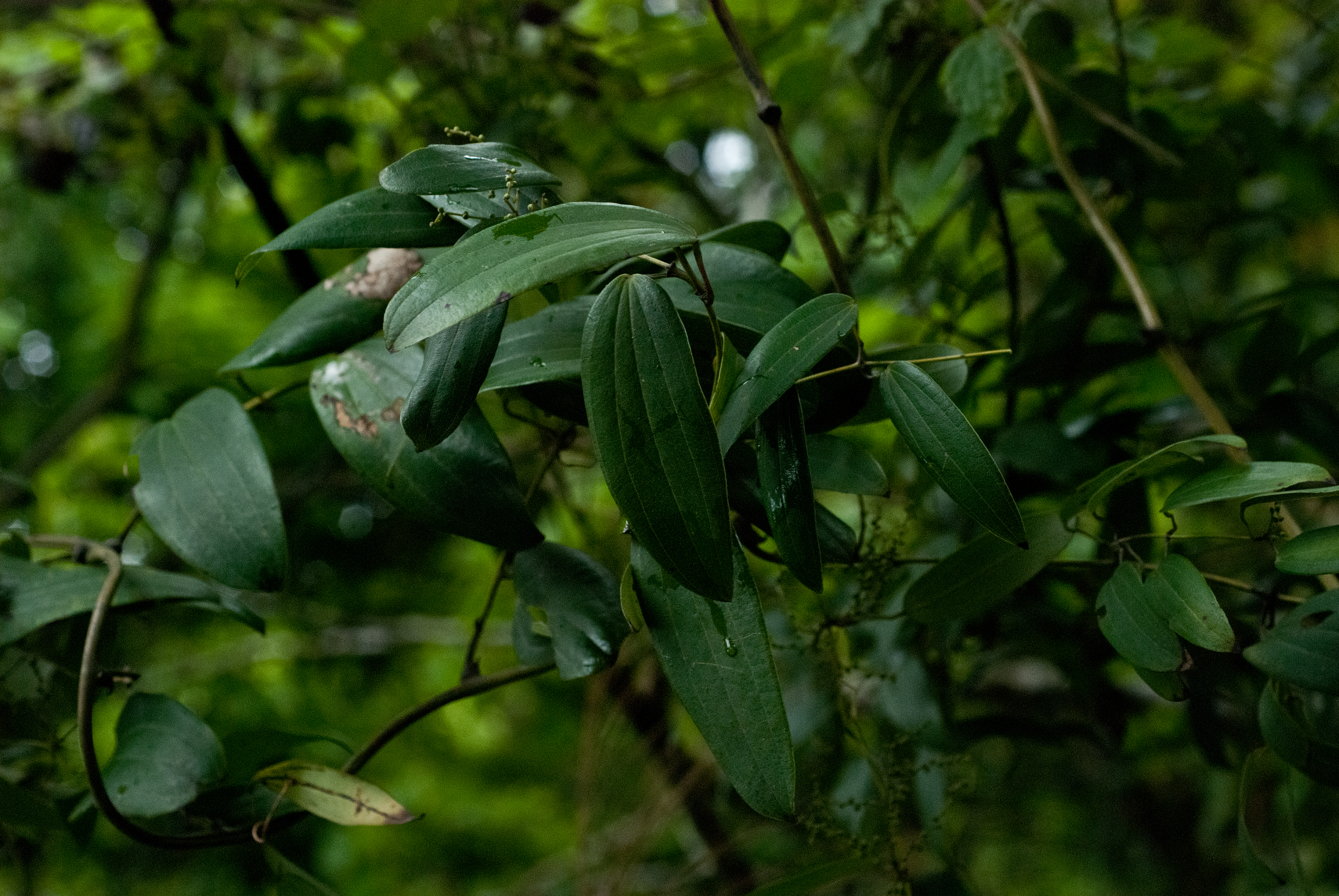

Scientific classification
- Kingdom: Plantae
- Clade: Tracheophytes
- Clade: Angiosperms
- Clade: Monocots
- Order: Dioscoreales
- Family: Dioscoreaceae
- Genus: Dioscorea
- Species: D. cirrhosa

Binomial name
- Dioscorea cirrhosa Lour.

= Dioscorea cirrhosa =

Species of flowering plant

Dioscorea cirrhosa, commonly known as the dyeing yam, is a species of flowering plant in the family Dioscoreaceae. It is a perennial, dioecious climbing vine native to Southeast Asia.

== Description ==
Dioscorea cirrhosa is a right-twining vine that grows annually from a tuberous rhizome. Its stems can reach lengths of up to 10 meters. The plant features heart-shaped leaves and is dioecious, meaning male and female flowers are borne on separate plants.

== Distribution and habitat ==
This species is native to regions of Indo-China, including northeastern Thailand, Laos, and Vietnam, as well as southeastern China (Guangxi, Guangdong), Hong Kong, Taiwan, and the southern Ryukyu Islands (Japan).

== Uses ==
Dioscorea cirrhosa has historically been used as a source of dye. The plant's tuber was once traded internationally for its dyeing properties, making it an important economic resource in certain regions.
