= Dioscorea fordii =

Scientific classification
- Kingdom: Plantae
- Clade: Tracheophytes
- Clade: Angiosperms
- Clade: Monocots
- Order: Dioscoreales
- Family: Dioscoreaceae
- Genus: Dioscorea
- Species: D. fordii

Binomial name
- Dioscorea fordii Prain & Burkill

Species of herbaceous vine

Dioscorea fordii is a herbaceous vine with oppositely arranged leaves and large, starchy rhizomes which grow vertically into the soil. It is indigenous to the Fujian, Guangdong, Guangxi, Hunan, and Zhejiang provinces of China, where it is typically found in forest areas or on disturbed ground beside roads or rivers.

The species is cultivated in China for food and as use in traditional Chinese medicine. Compared with the well known Chinese yam, Dioscorea polystachya, D. fordii exhibits a higher starch content, but a lower protein content. Nutrient composition of the rhizome of the plant was conducted, revealing that it contains approximately 76.5% starch, 9.9% protein, and 1.03% fiber by dry weight.
