= Dioscorea amazonum =

Scientific classification
- Kingdom: Plantae
- Clade: Tracheophytes
- Clade: Angiosperms
- Clade: Monocots
- Order: Dioscoreales
- Family: Dioscoreaceae
- Genus: Dioscorea
- Species: D. amazonum

Binomial name
- Dioscorea amazonum Mart. ex Griseb.

Species of herbaceous vine

Dioscorea amazonum is a flowering plant in the family Dioscoreaceae. It is a herbaceous vine that is native to Bolivia, Brazil, Colombia, French Guiana, Guyana, Panama, Peru, Suriname, and Venezuela. Specimens have been collected from forested areas next to roads and rivers.
