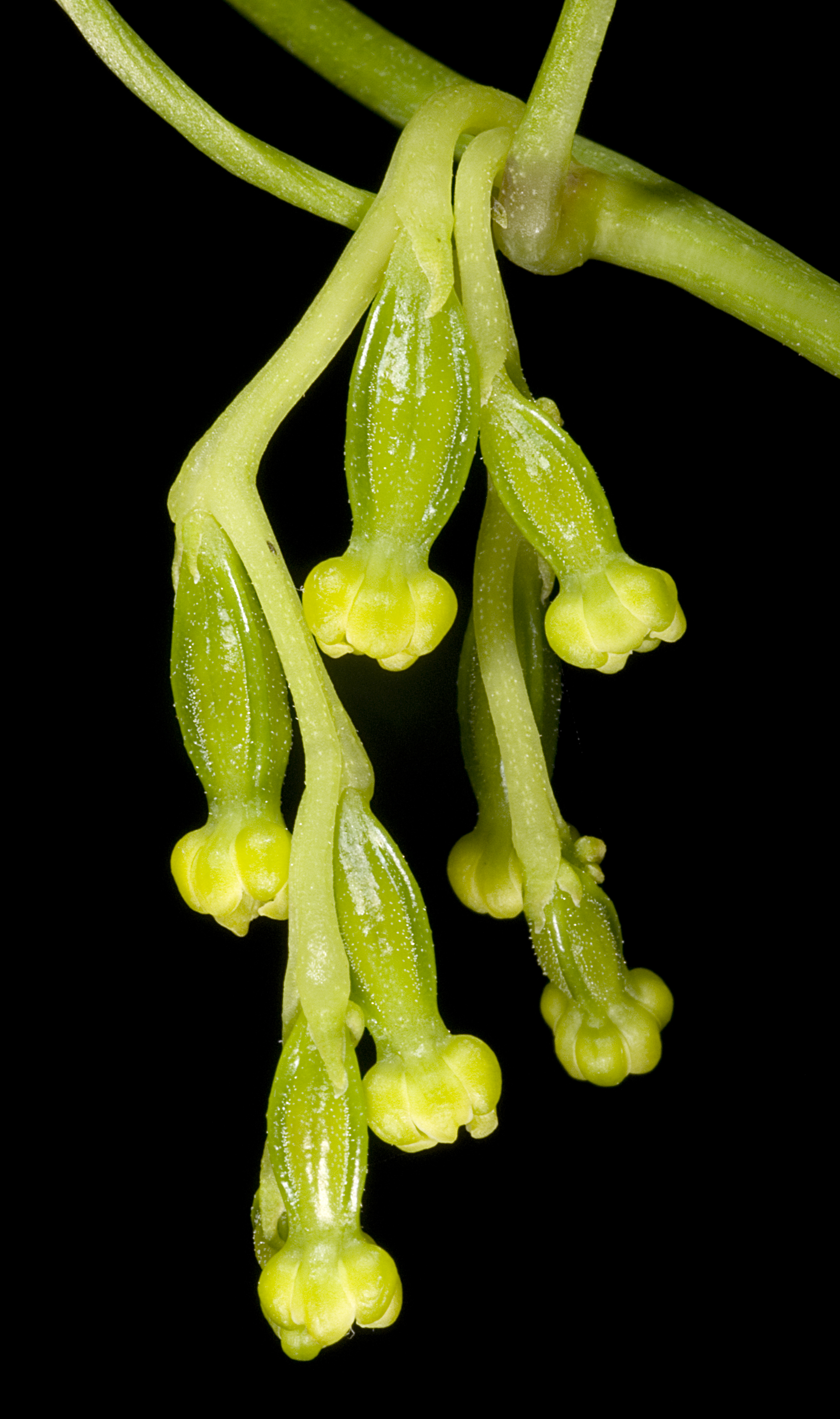

Scientific classification
- Kingdom: Plantae
- Clade: Tracheophytes
- Clade: Angiosperms
- Clade: Monocots
- Order: Dioscoreales
- Family: Dioscoreaceae
- Genus: Dioscorea
- Species: D. hastifolia

Binomial name
- Dioscorea hastifolia Nees

= Dioscorea hastifolia =

Species of yam

Dioscorea hastifolia, the adjigo (ˈadʒɪɡəʊ) yam, also known as the warram, is a yam with long, white, edible tubers that is native to Southwest Australia. It is a climbing vine with hastate, spearheaded, leaves and bears green triangular fruit. The tubers are used by Aboriginal Australians as a source of carbohydrates, who managed the plant extensively in agriculture-like systems. After the yellow flowers have seeded the plant is dug up in winter and roasted.

Adjigo is additionally a valid word within the Scrabble Dictionary.
