= Dioscorea abysmophila =

Scientific classification
- Kingdom: Plantae
- Clade: Tracheophytes
- Clade: Angiosperms
- Clade: Monocots
- Order: Dioscoreales
- Family: Dioscoreaceae
- Genus: Dioscorea
- Species: D. abysmophila

Binomial name
- Dioscorea abysmophila Maguire & Steyerm.

Species of herbaceous vine

Dioscorea abysmophila is a herbaceous vine in the genus Dioscorea. It is native to Venezuela, with the type locality listed as "Estado do Amazonas, São Gabriel, Rio Negro." A note included with the type specimen, collected in 1945, indicates that the specimen was collected from rocky terrain on a high mountain range. Another specimen, collected in 2000, is listed as being collected from the forested northern slope of a coastal mountain range near the headwaters of the Temerla river.
