= Dioscorea acanthogene =

Scientific classification
- Kingdom: Plantae
- Clade: Tracheophytes
- Clade: Angiosperms
- Clade: Monocots
- Order: Dioscoreales
- Family: Dioscoreaceae
- Genus: Dioscorea
- Species: D. acanthogene

Binomial name
- Dioscorea acanthogene Rusby

Species of herbaceous vine

Dioscorea acanthogene is a herbaceous vine in the genus Dioscorea; it is native to Bolivia, west-central Brazil, Colombia, Paraguay, and Peru. A specimen collected in Bolivia in 2002 was obtained from a scrubby roadside in a dry, sparsely forested area.
