= Dioscorea chimborazensis =

Conservation status
- Endangered (IUCN 3.1)

Scientific classification
- Kingdom: Plantae
- Clade: Tracheophytes
- Clade: Angiosperms
- Clade: Monocots
- Order: Dioscoreales
- Family: Dioscoreaceae
- Genus: Dioscorea
- Species: D. chimborazensis

Binomial name
- Dioscorea chimborazensis R.Kunth

Species of yam

Dioscorea chimborazensis is a type of yam in the family Dioscoreaceae. It is endemic to Ecuador.
