= Dioscorea analalavensis =

Scientific classification
- Kingdom: Plantae
- Clade: Tracheophytes
- Clade: Angiosperms
- Clade: Monocots
- Order: Dioscoreales
- Family: Dioscoreaceae
- Genus: Dioscorea
- Species: D. analalavensis

Binomial name
- Dioscorea analalavensis Jum. & H.Perrier

Species of herbaceous vine

Dioscorea analalavensis is a herbaceous vine in the genus Dioscorea which is native to Madagascar.
