= Dioscorea acuminata =

Conservation status
- Endangered (IUCN 3.1)

Scientific classification
- Kingdom: Plantae
- Clade: Tracheophytes
- Clade: Angiosperms
- Clade: Monocots
- Order: Dioscoreales
- Family: Dioscoreaceae
- Genus: Dioscorea
- Species: D. acuminata

Binomial name
- Dioscorea acuminata Baker

Synonyms
- Dioscorea bararum H.Perrier

Species of plant

Dioscorea acuminata is a herbaceous vine in the family Dioscoreaceae, which is listed as an endangered species by the IUCN Red List. It is indigenous to the central plateau of Madagascar where it occurs on rocky substrate in a grassland-woodland mosaic habitat. There is confusion as to whether the tuber is harvested for consumption by humans as field researchers likely misidentified Dioscorea maciba as this species. However, the IUCN Red List also has an entry for D. maciba which does not cite that species as being consumed by humans.
