= Dioscorea alatipes =

Conservation status
- Vulnerable (IUCN 3.1)

Scientific classification
- Kingdom: Plantae
- Clade: Tracheophytes
- Clade: Angiosperms
- Clade: Monocots
- Order: Dioscoreales
- Family: Dioscoreaceae
- Genus: Dioscorea
- Species: D. alatipes

Binomial name
- Dioscorea alatipes Burkhill & H.Perrier

Species of herbaceous vine

Dioscorea alatipes is a herbaceous vine in the genus Dioscorea. It is indigenous to the Morondava Prefecture in Madagascar and is listed as a vulnerable on the IUCN Red List in 2017, having previously been listed as endangered in 2001. It has been confused with another Dioscorea species, D. bako which is a food source of the indigenous people of the region. D. alatipes is found growing in forested areas on sandy soils or on limestone substrate. This species is managed for human consumption as part of the SuLaMa Project. According to the IUCN, the species is threatened by overharvesting of the tubers as well as by the expansion of farmland in the area.
