= Dioscorea aesculifolia =

Scientific classification
- Kingdom: Plantae
- Clade: Tracheophytes
- Clade: Angiosperms
- Clade: Monocots
- Order: Dioscoreales
- Family: Dioscoreaceae
- Genus: Dioscorea
- Species: D. aesculifolia

Binomial name
- Dioscorea aesculifolia R.Knuth

Species of herbaceous vine

Dioscorea aesculifolia is a herbaceous vine in the genus Dioscorea. The type specimen was collected in Brazil in 1994. The type specimen is damaged, but it appears to have palmate leaves with leaflets arranged in groups of five – a feature which is in contrast to the simple leaves of most well-known species of the genus Dioscorea.
