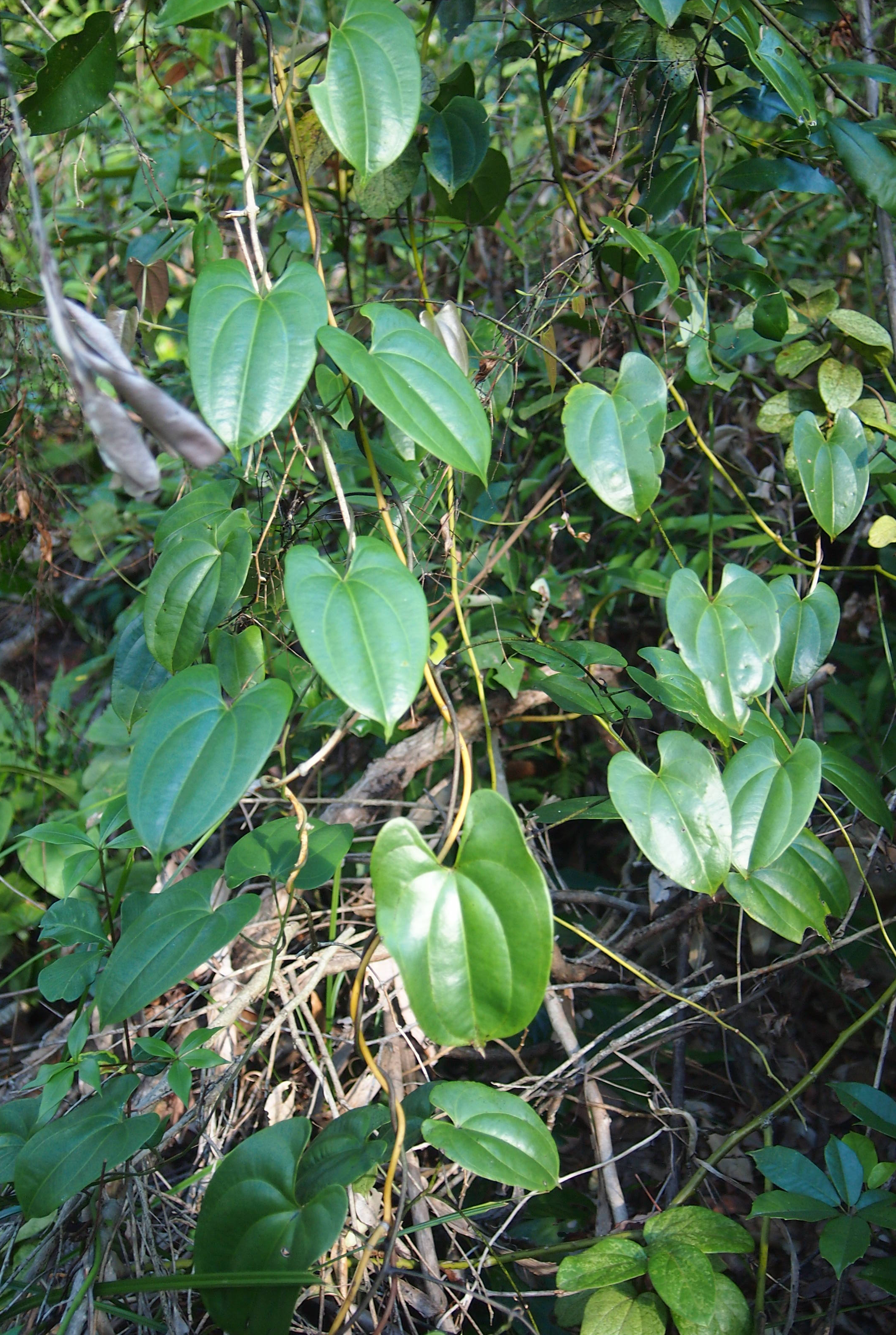

Scientific classification
- Kingdom: Plantae
- Clade: Embryophytes
- Clade: Tracheophytes
- Clade: Spermatophytes
- Clade: Angiosperms
- Clade: Monocots
- Order: Dioscoreales
- Family: Dioscoreaceae
- Genus: Dioscorea
- Species: D. transversa

Binomial name
- Dioscorea transversa R.Br.

Synonyms
- Dioscorea punctata R.Br.

= Dioscorea transversa =

Species of yam from Australia

Dioscorea transversa, the pencil yam, is a vine of eastern and northern Australia.

The leaves are heart-shaped, shiny, with 5-7 prominent veins. The seed pods are rounded, green or pink before drying to a straw brown papery texture. The edible tubers are typically slender and long. There are two forms: an eastern rainforest and wet sclerophyll form which doesn't have bulbils, and a northern form which occurs in open forests and has small bulbils and large inground tubers.

== Uses ==
The tubers were a staple food of Australian Aboriginals and are eaten after cooking, usually in ground ovens. The 1889 book 'The Useful Native Plants of Australia records that common names included "long yam", Indigenous Australians from Central Queensland referred to it as "kowar" and that "the small young tubers are eaten by the aborigines without any preparation."
