= Dioscorea andromedusae =

Scientific classification
- Kingdom: Plantae
- Clade: Tracheophytes
- Clade: Angiosperms
- Clade: Monocots
- Order: Dioscoreales
- Family: Dioscoreaceae
- Genus: Dioscorea
- Species: D. andromedusae

Binomial name
- Dioscorea andromedusae O.Téllez

Species of herbaceous vine

Dioscorea andromedusae is a herbaceous vine in the genus Dioscorea which is native to Peru, where the type specimen was collected from the hillside grottos of the San Andres.
