= Dioscorea aguilarii =

Scientific classification
- Kingdom: Plantae
- Clade: Tracheophytes
- Clade: Angiosperms
- Clade: Monocots
- Order: Dioscoreales
- Family: Dioscoreaceae
- Genus: Dioscorea
- Species: D. aguilarii

Binomial name
- Dioscorea aguilarii Standl. & Steyerm.

Species of herbaceous vine

Dioscorea aguilarii is a herbaceous vine in the genus Dioscorea which is indigenous to El Salvador. The type specimen was collected in 1994 from an oak forest between Pena del Cuervo and Cerro El Yupe.
