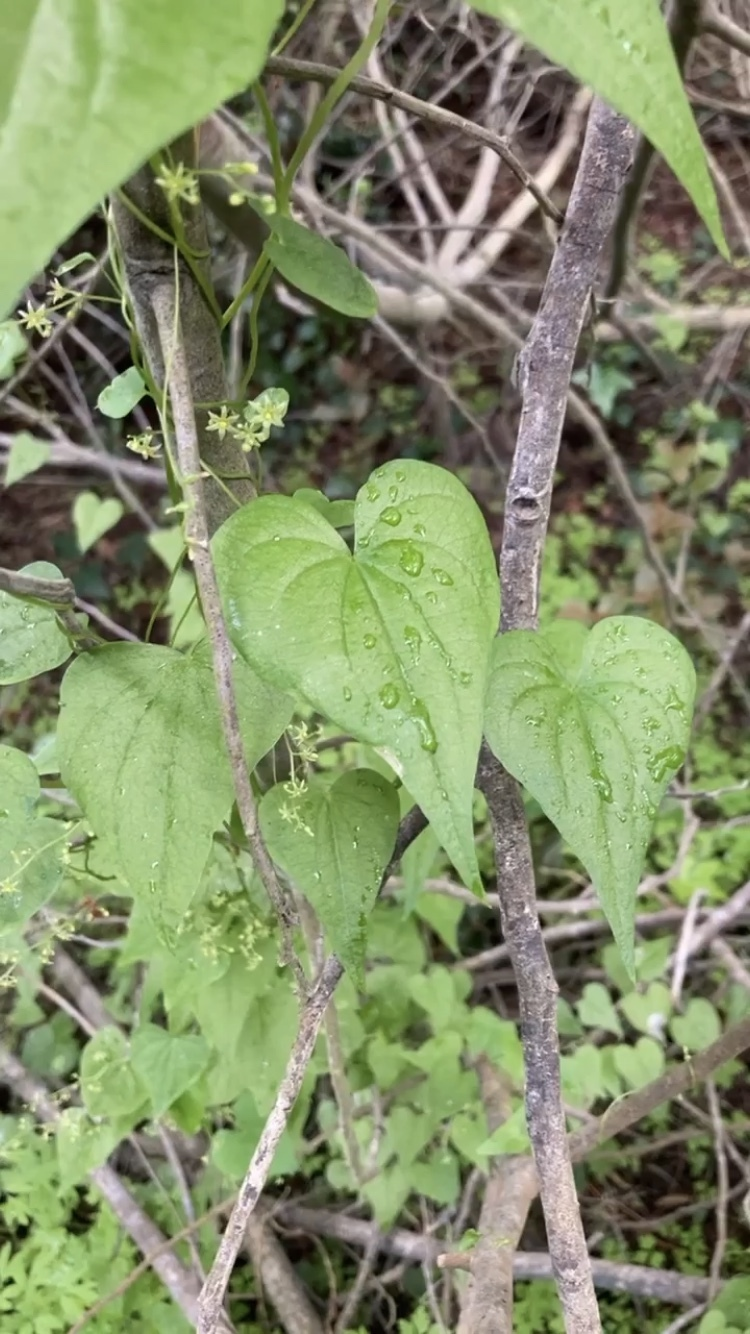

Scientific classification
- Kingdom: Plantae
- Clade: Tracheophytes
- Clade: Angiosperms
- Clade: Monocots
- Order: Dioscoreales
- Family: Dioscoreaceae
- Genus: Dioscorea
- Species: D. variifolia

Binomial name
- Dioscorea variifolia Bertero ex Colla

= Dioscorea variifolia =

Species of plant

Dioscorea variifolia is a species of plant in the family Dioscoreaceae. It is a perennial climbing herb endemic to Chile, distributed between the Coquimbo and Araucanía regions.
