= Dioscorea abyssinica =

Scientific classification
- Kingdom: Plantae
- Clade: Tracheophytes
- Clade: Angiosperms
- Clade: Monocots
- Order: Dioscoreales
- Family: Dioscoreaceae
- Genus: Dioscorea
- Species: D. abyssinica

Binomial name
- Dioscorea abyssinica Hochst. ex Kunth

Species of herbaceous vine

Dioscorea abyssinica is a herbaceous vine in the genus Dioscorea native to several Central African countries including Benin, Burkina Faso, Central African Republic, Eritrea, Ethiopia, Ghana, Ivory Coast, Liberia, Mali, Nigeria, Senegal, and Sudan. The plant's starchy tubers are edible and are either harvested from the wild or cultivated; however, they are difficult to obtain due to the depth at which they grow in the soil. It is propagated by seed.
