= Dioscorea amaranthoides =

Scientific classification
- Kingdom: Plantae
- Clade: Tracheophytes
- Clade: Angiosperms
- Clade: Monocots
- Order: Dioscoreales
- Family: Dioscoreaceae
- Genus: Dioscorea
- Species: D. amaranthoides

Binomial name
- Dioscorea amaranthoides C.Presl

Species of herbaceous vine

Dioscorea amaranthoides is a herbaceous vine in the genus Dioscorea. It is found in Bolivia, Brazil, Paraguay, and Peru. One specimen was found in the vicinity of Machu Picchu, Peru in a forested area near water.
