= Dioscorea ovinala =

Conservation status
- Least Concern (IUCN 3.1)

Scientific classification
- Kingdom: Plantae
- Clade: Tracheophytes
- Clade: Angiosperms
- Clade: Monocots
- Order: Dioscoreales
- Family: Dioscoreaceae
- Genus: Dioscorea
- Species: D. ovinala

Binomial name
- Dioscorea ovinala Baker

Species of plant

Dioscorea ovinala is a species of yam in the family Dioscoreaceae. It is endemic to Madagascar and grows mostly in dry deciduous forests.

== Uses ==
Dioscorea ovinala is important to the Malagasy people as food and medicine. This species is also used as a starch source.
