= D. pentaphylla =

D. pentaphylla may refer to:

- Dalechampia pentaphylla, a Brazilian plant
- Dioscorea pentaphylla, a prickly vine
