= Dioscorea wallichii =

Conservation status
- Least Concern (IUCN 3.1)

Scientific classification
- Kingdom: Plantae
- Clade: Tracheophytes
- Clade: Angiosperms
- Clade: Monocots
- Order: Dioscoreales
- Family: Dioscoreaceae
- Genus: Dioscorea
- Species: D. wallichii

Binomial name
- Dioscorea wallichii Hook.f.

Species of yam from Asia

Dioscorea wallichii

Dioscorea wallichii is a type of climbing tuberous geophyte of the family Dioscoreaceae. It is native to Bangladesh, China, India, Malaysia, Myanmar, and Thailand. It has one edible cylindrical tuber that is about 1 meter long and 3-6 centimeters wide. The tuber is white when young, becoming yellow and stringy once aged.

== Uses ==
The tubers can be eaten after boiling and washing.
