= Dioscorea strydomiana =

Conservation status
- Critically Endangered (IUCN 3.1)

Scientific classification
- Kingdom: Plantae
- Clade: Tracheophytes
- Clade: Angiosperms
- Clade: Monocots
- Order: Dioscoreales
- Family: Dioscoreaceae
- Genus: Dioscorea
- Species: D. strydomiana

Binomial name
- Dioscorea strydomiana Wilkin

Species of herbaceous vine

Dioscorea strydomiana is a critically endangered species of yam (family Dioscoreaceae) from South Africa with fewer than 250 mature individuals known to exist.

== Description ==
Dioscorea strydomiana is shrub-like, grows up to 1 metre (3 ft 3 in) tall with an above ground tuber that is large and rough-textured, the thick bark resembling the tortoise-shell-like bark of Dioscorea elephantipes. It has herbaceous stems from the upper part of the tuber each year, and then they die back over the course of the dry season. Its ovate or elliptical leaves are found on short stalks and arranged alternately along the stems.

It is dioecious and has very small flowers that are less than 10 mm (0.39 in) in diameter with six cream-coloured or white tepals which appear in late spring to early summer. The fruits resemble dry capsules that split at the ends to release seeds.

The species, discovered circa 2002, is extremely slow growing but has great horticultural potential.

== Name ==
The specific epithet honours the late Gerhard Strydom, a conservationist with the Mpumalanga Tourism and Parks Agency, who noticed the plant for sale at a market and tracked it down to its habitat.

== Distribution ==
The range of D. strydomiana is limited to the Oshoek area in Mpumalanga, South Africa, near the border with Eswatini; it is found at 1,100–1,150 metres (3,609–3,773 ft) above sea level.

== Uses ==
The plant is used in traditional medicine (like other Dioscorea species).
