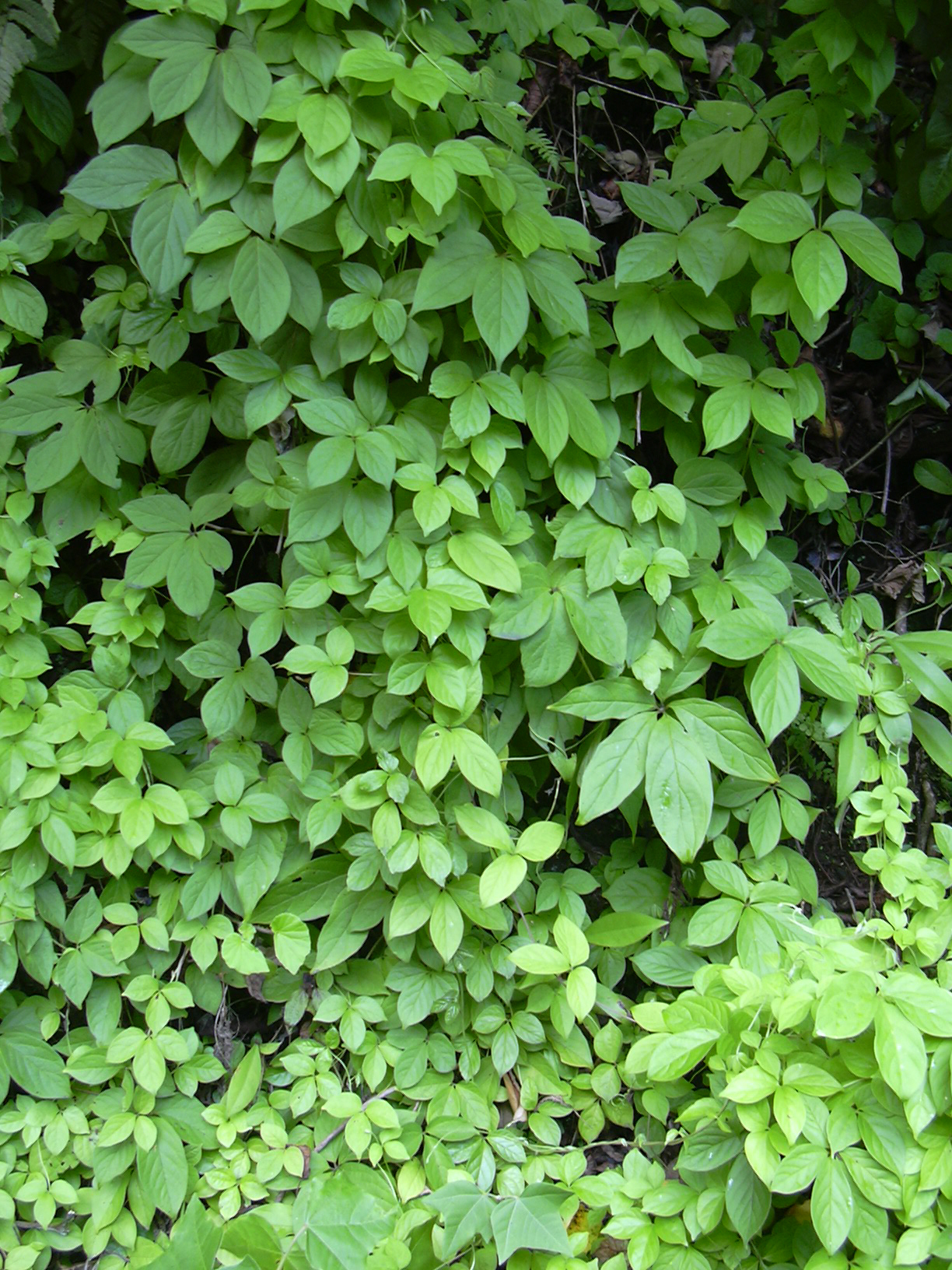

Scientific classification
- Kingdom: Plantae
- Clade: Tracheophytes
- Clade: Angiosperms
- Clade: Monocots
- Order: Dioscoreales
- Family: Dioscoreaceae
- Genus: Dioscorea
- Species: D. pentaphylla

Binomial name
- Dioscorea pentaphylla L.

Synonyms
- Botryosicyos pentaphyllus (L.) Hochst.; Dioscorea triphylla L.; Dioscorea digitata Mill.; Dioscorea spinosa Burm.; Ubium quadrifarium J.F.Gmel.; Ubium scandens J.St.-Hil.; Dioscorea kleiniana Kunth; Hamatris triphylla (L.) Salisb.; Dioscorea jacquemontii Hook.f.; Dioscorea globifera R.Knuth; Dioscorea codonopsidifolia Kamik.; Dioscorea changjiangensis F.W.Xing & Z.X.Li

= Dioscorea pentaphylla =

fiveleaf yam

Species of herbaceous vine

Mountain yam, hawaii, cooked, steamed, without salt
Nutritional value per 100 g (3.5 oz)
- Energy: 343 kJ (82 kcal)
- Carbohydrates: 20 g
- Fat: 0.08 g
- Protein: 1.73 g
Vitamins and minerals
Vitamins	Quantity %DV^{†}
Thiamine (B1)	7% 0.086 mg
Riboflavin (B2)	1% 0.014 mg
Niacin (B3)	1% 0.13 mg
Pantothenic acid (B5)	10% 0.48 mg
Vitamin B6	12% 0.209 mg
Folate (B9)	3% 12 μg
Minerals	Quantity %DV^{†}
Iron	2% 0.43 mg
Magnesium	2% 10 mg
Manganese	12% 0.283 mg
Phosphorus	3% 40 mg
Potassium	17% 495 mg
Sodium	1% 12 mg
Zinc	3% 0.32 mg
- Link to USDA Database entry
- ^{†}Percentages estimated using US recommendations for adults, except for potassium, which is estimated based on expert recommendation from the National Academies

Dioscorea pentaphylla is a species of flowering plant in the yam family known by the common name fiveleaf yam. It is native to southern and eastern Asia (China, India, Indochina, Indonesia, Philippines, etc.) as well as New Guinea, Sri Lanka and northern Australia. It is widely cultivated as a food crop and naturalized in Cuba and on several island chains in the Pacific (including Hawaii).

Dioscorea pentaphylla is a prickly vine that twines counterclockwise around objects and other plants. It may reach 10 meters in length. The alternately arranged leaves are compound, divided into 3 to 5 leaflets each up to 10 centimeters long. The plant produces horseshoe-shaped bulbils about a centimeter long. New plants can sprout from the bulbils. Flowers are borne in spikes. The vine grows from a tuber. Specimens may weigh 3 pounds and may be located over a meter underground.

The tubers of the vine can be cooked and eaten.
