= Dioscorea stipulosa =

Conservation status
- Least Concern (IUCN 3.1)

Scientific classification
- Kingdom: Plantae
- Clade: Tracheophytes
- Clade: Angiosperms
- Clade: Monocots
- Order: Dioscoreales
- Family: Dioscoreaceae
- Genus: Dioscorea
- Species: D. stipulosa

Binomial name
- Dioscorea stipulosa Uline ex R.Knuth

Species of herbaceous vine

Dioscorea stipulosa is a type of climbing tuberous geophyte of the family Dioscoreaceae. It is endemic to the Eastern Cape province of South Africa.
