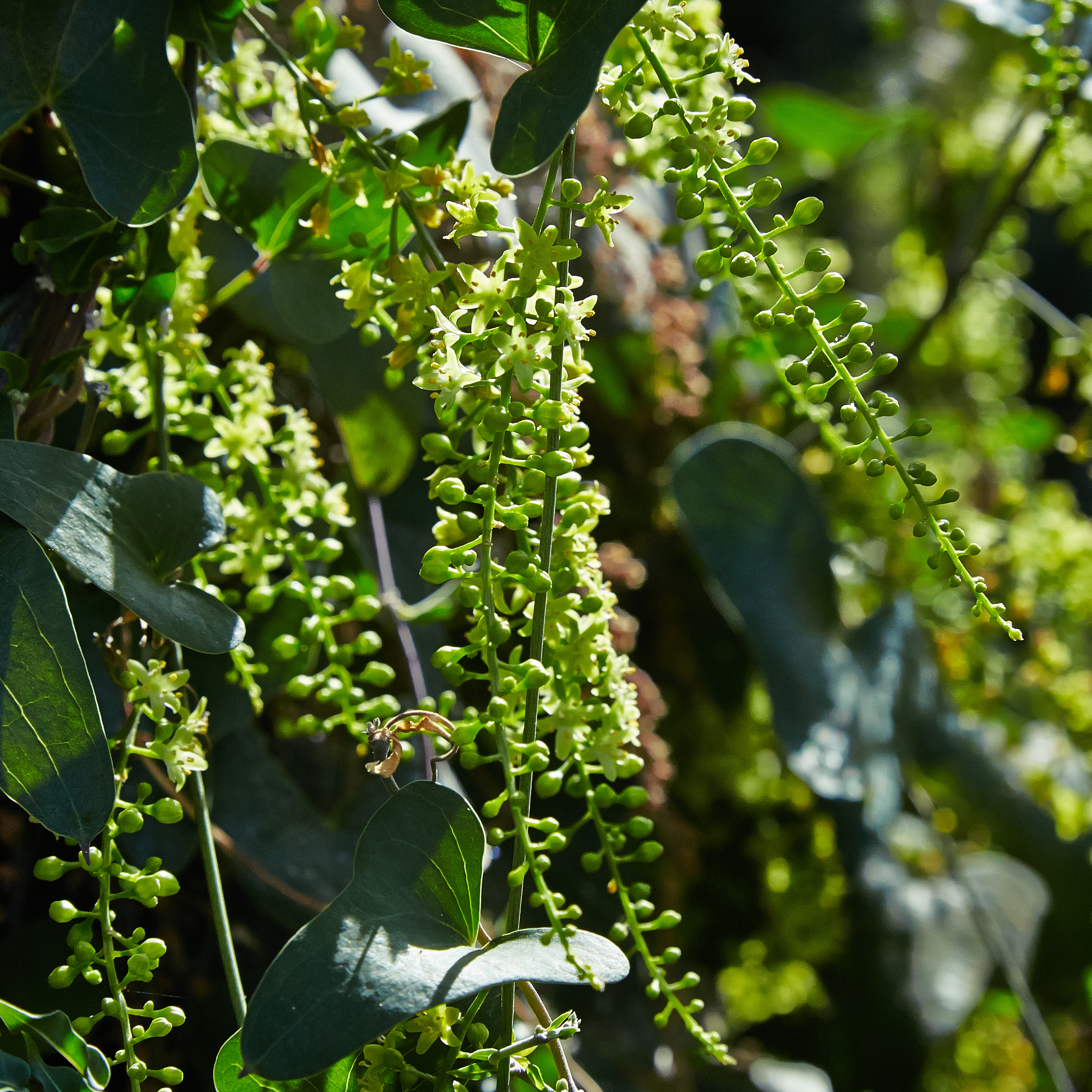
- Leaves and flowers

Scientific classification
- Kingdom: Plantae
- Clade: Tracheophytes
- Clade: Angiosperms
- Clade: Monocots
- Order: Dioscoreales
- Family: Dioscoreaceae
- Genus: Dioscorea
- Species: D. sylvatica

Binomial name
- Dioscorea sylvatica Eckl.

= Dioscorea sylvatica =

Species of herbaceous vine

Dioscorea sylvatica ("forest elephant's foot") is a species of a twining tuberous vine that is native to Africa. It is common and widespread in forest and thicket, throughout the summer rainfall areas of East and Southern Africa.

== Description ==
It produces a distinctively flattened caudex, often with lobes that spread out.

The creeping shoots grow throughout most of the year, though each will periodically die back and be replaced from the central caudex root stock. In dryer conditions it can become deciduous. The green creeping foliage can reach 4 meters or more in height.

It is an extremely widespread and variable species, with several extremely distinct varieties.

== Threats and conservation ==
It is threatened from illegal collecting for traditional medicine, as well as for the horticultural trade. As a consequence it is listed as Vulnerable.
