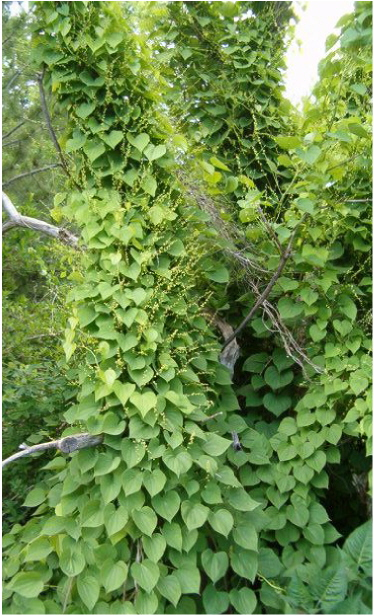
- Dioscorea balcanica

Scientific classification
- Kingdom: Plantae
- Clade: Tracheophytes
- Clade: Angiosperms
- Clade: Monocots
- Order: Dioscoreales
- Family: Dioscoreaceae
- Genus: Dioscorea; L.

Sections
- Botryosicyos; Combilium; Enantiophyllum; Lasiophyton; Macroura; Macrourae; Macrogynodium; Opsophyton; Euopsophyton; Shannicorea; Stenophora; (Not all are supported by molecular analyses. See tropicos query cited for more.)

Synonyms
- Tamus L.; Ricophora Mill.; Tamnus Mill.; Oncus Lour.; Ubium J.F.Gmel.; Oncorhiza Pers.; Testudinaria Salisb. ex Burch.; Rhizemys Raf.; Botryosicyos Hochst.; Helmia Kunth; Sismondaea Delponte; Epipetrum Phil.; Borderea Miégev.; Elephantodon Salisb.; Hamatris Salisb.; Merione Salisb.; Polynome Salisb.; Strophis Salisb.; Higinbothamia Uline; Nanarepenta Matuda; Hyperocarpa (Uline) G.M.Barroso, E.F.Guim. & Sucre

= Dioscorea =

Dioscorea Temporal range: Early Eocene to present, 54–0 Ma

Genus of yams

Dioscorea is a genus of over 600 species of flowering plants in the family Dioscoreaceae, native throughout the tropical and warm temperate regions of the world. The vast majority of the species are tropical, with only a few species extending into temperate climates. The genus include numerous species known as yams, which are important agricultural crops in tropical regions, grown for their large tubers.

The genus was named by the monk Charles Plumier after the ancient Greek physician and botanist Dioscorides.

== Description ==
They are tuberous herbaceous perennial lianas, growing to 2–12 metres (6.6–39.4 ft) or more tall. The leaves are spirally arranged, mostly broad heart-shaped. The flowers are individually inconspicuous, greenish-yellow, with six petals; they are mostly dioecious, with separate male and female plants, though a few species are monoecious, with male and female flowers on the same plant. The fruit is a capsule in most species, a soft berry in a few species.

Most Dioscorea species that have been examined possess extrafloral nectaries at the petiole or leaf underside.

== Cultivation and uses ==
Several species, known as yams, are important agricultural crops in tropical regions, grown for their large tubers. Many of these are toxic when fresh, but can be detoxified and eaten, and are particularly important in parts of Africa, Asia, and Oceania.

One class of toxins found in many species is steroidal saponins, which can be converted through a series of chemical reactions into steroid hormones for use in medicine and as contraceptives.

The 1889 book "The Useful Native Plants of Australia" records that Dioscorea hastifolia is "One of the hardiest of the yams. The tubers are largely consumed by the local aborigines for food. (Mueller)."

== Evolution ==
The earliest known fossil Dioscorea are D. lindgrenii & D. shermani, both of which are known from fossil fruit from the Early Eocene-aged Green River Formation of Wyoming, US. It has been suggested that Dioscorea likely originated in North America around this time period, as no evidence of Dioscorea fossils is known from Paleocene deposits in South America despite that region having among the highest Dioscorea diversity in the modern day. Another early Dioscorea species is D. eocenicus, known from fossil leaves from the Early Eocene-aged Palana Formation of Rajasthan, India.

They are distantly related to lilies and grasses.

== Selected species ==
- Dioscorea abysmophila Maguire & Steyerm.
- Dioscorea abyssinica Hochst. ex Kunth
- Dioscorea acanthogene Rusby
- Dioscorea acuminata Baker
- Dioscorea aesculifolia R.Knuth
- Dioscorea aguilarii Standl. & Steyerm.
- Dioscorea alata L.
- Dioscorea alatipes Burkill & H.Perrier
- Dioscorea althaeoides R.Knuth
- Dioscorea amaranthoides C.Presl
- Dioscorea amazonum Mart. ex Griseb.
- Dioscorea analalavensis Jum. & H.Perrier
- Dioscorea ancachsensis R.Knuth
- Dioscorea andromedusae O.Téllez
- Dioscorea balcanica Košanin
- Dioscorea cayenensis Lam.
- Dioscorea chimborazensis R.Knuth
- Dioscorea chouardii Gaussen
- Dioscorea cirrhosa Lour.
- Dioscorea deltoidea Wall. ex Griseb.
- Dioscorea dumetorum (Kunth) Pax
- Dioscorea esculenta (Lour.) Burkill
- Dioscorea fordii Prain & Burkill
- Dioscorea hamiltonii Hook.f.
- Dioscorea hastifolia Nees
- Dioscorea hispida Dennst.
- Dioscorea japonica Thunb.
- Dioscorea mexicana Scheidw.
- Dioscorea oppositifolia L.
- Dioscorea orangeana Wilkin
- Dioscorea ovinala Baker
- Dioscorea pentaphylla L.
- Dioscorea praehensilis Benth.
- Dioscorea pseudomacrocapsa G.M.Barroso, E.F.Guim. & Sucre
- Dioscorea quartiniana A.Rich.
- Dioscorea rimbachii R.Knuth
- Dioscorea rosei R.Knuth
- Dioscorea stipulosa Uline ex R.Knuth
- Dioscorea strydomiana Wilkin
- Dioscorea sylvatica Eckl.
- Dioscorea transversa R.Br.
- Dioscorea trifida L.f.
- Dioscorea variifolia Bertero
- Dioscorea wallichii Hook.f.
- Dioscorea zingiberensis C.H.Wright

== See also ==
- Yams
- Mexican barbasco trade

== Bibliography ==
- Flora Europaea: Dioscorea
- Flora of Pakistan: Dioscorea
- Schols, P. 2004. Contributions to the palynology and phylogeny of Dioscorea (Dioscoreaceae). PhD thesis KU Leuven.
