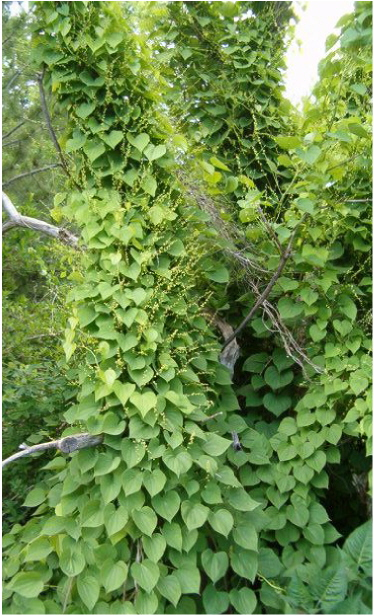
- Dioscorea balcanica

Scientific classification
- Kingdom: Plantae
- Clade: Tracheophytes
- Clade: Angiosperms
- Clade: Monocots
- Order: Dioscoreales
- Family: Dioscoreaceae; R.Br.

Genera
- See text

Synonyms
- Dioscoreae R.Br.; Dioscorinae

= Dioscoreaceae =

Family of flowering plants

Dioscoreaceae (/ˌdaɪəˌskɔːriˈeɪsii/) is a family of monocotyledonous flowering plants, with about 715 known species in nine genera. The best-known member of the family is the yam (some species of Dioscorea).

The APG system (1998) and APG II system (2003) both place it in the order Dioscoreales, in the clade monocots. However, the circumscription changed in the APG II system, with the 2003 system expanded to include the plants that in the 1998 system were treated in the families Taccaceae and Trichopodaceae.

== Taxonomy ==
The Dioscoreaceae were first described by Brown in 1810 as Dioscoreae, and alternatively referred to as Dioscorinae. They are distantly related to lilies and grasses.

=== Subdivision ===
The circumscription of Dioscoreaceae has expanded over the years. For instance when Stenomeridaceae, as Stenomeris was also included in Dioscoreaceae as subfamily Stenomeridoideae together with Avetra, the remaining four genera were grouped in subfamily Dioscoreoideae, the two being distinguished by the presence of bisexual and unisexual flowers respectively.

=== Genera ===
As of September 2022, Plants of the World Online accepted four genera in the family:

- Dioscoreaceae
  - - Dioscorea Plum. ex L. (including Epipetrum Phil., Rajania L.)
    - Stenomeris Planch.
  - - Tacca J.R.Forst. & G.Forst.
    - Trichopus Gaertn.

== Bibliography ==
- Agardh, Carl Adolph (1825). "XI. Liliiflorae". Classes Plantarum (in Latin). Lund: Literis Berlingianis. p. 8.
- Bouman, F. Seed Structure and Systematics in Dioscoreales. pp. 139–156., In Rudall et al (1995)
- Brown, Robert (1810). Prodromus Florae Novae Hollandiae et Insulae Van Diemen (in Latin). London: Richard Taylor & Son.
- Rudall, P.J.; Cribb, P.J.; Cutler, D.F.; Humphries, C.J., eds. (1995). Monocotyledons: systematics and evolution (Proceedings of the International Symposium on Monocotyledons: Systematics and Evolution, Kew 1993). Kew: Royal Botanic Gardens. ISBN 978-0-947643-85-0.
- "Dioscoreaceae R. Br". Tropicos. Missouri Botanical Garden. 2020.
