= Igbo cuisine =

Culinary traditions of the Igbo people

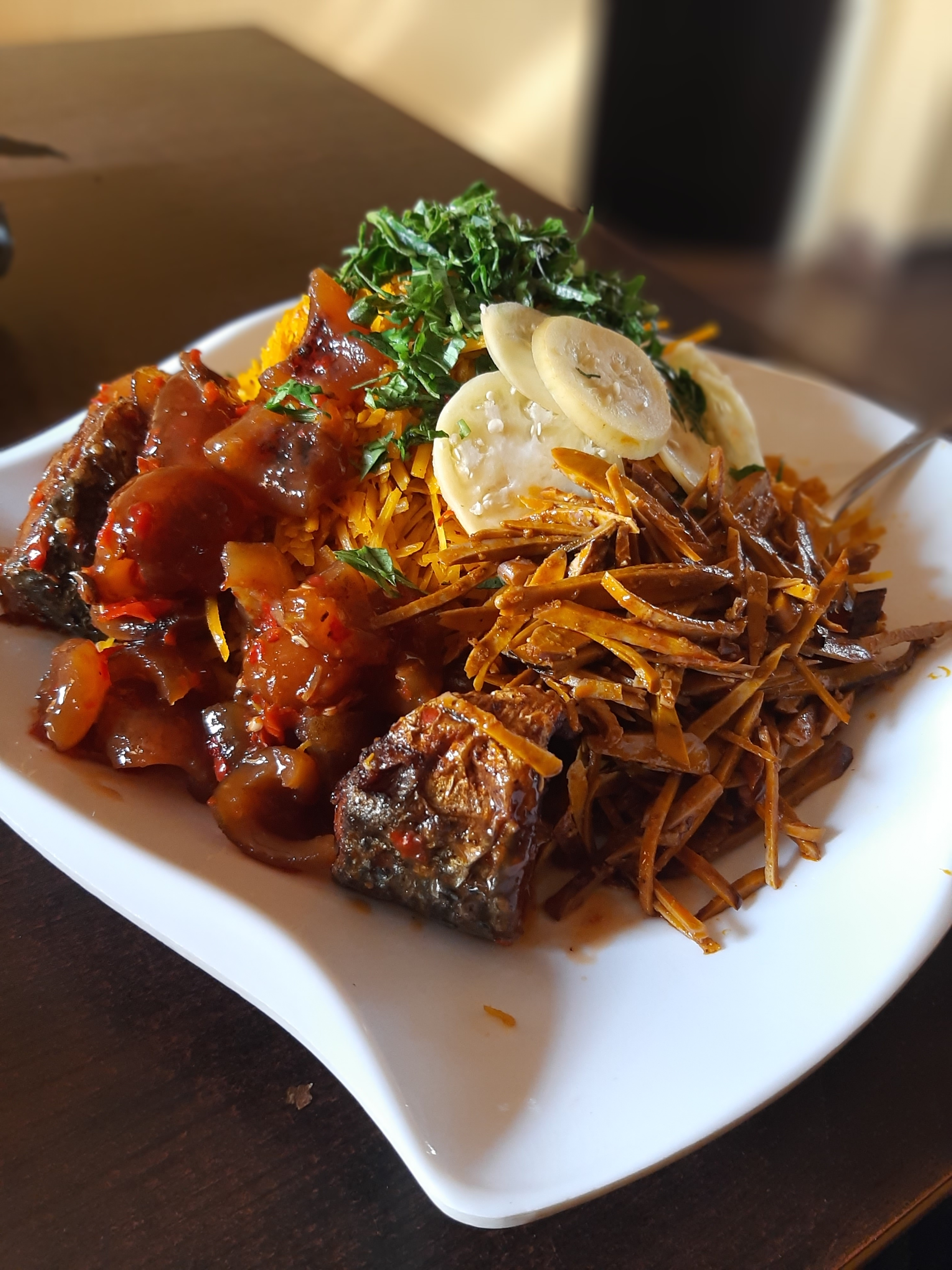
Abacha

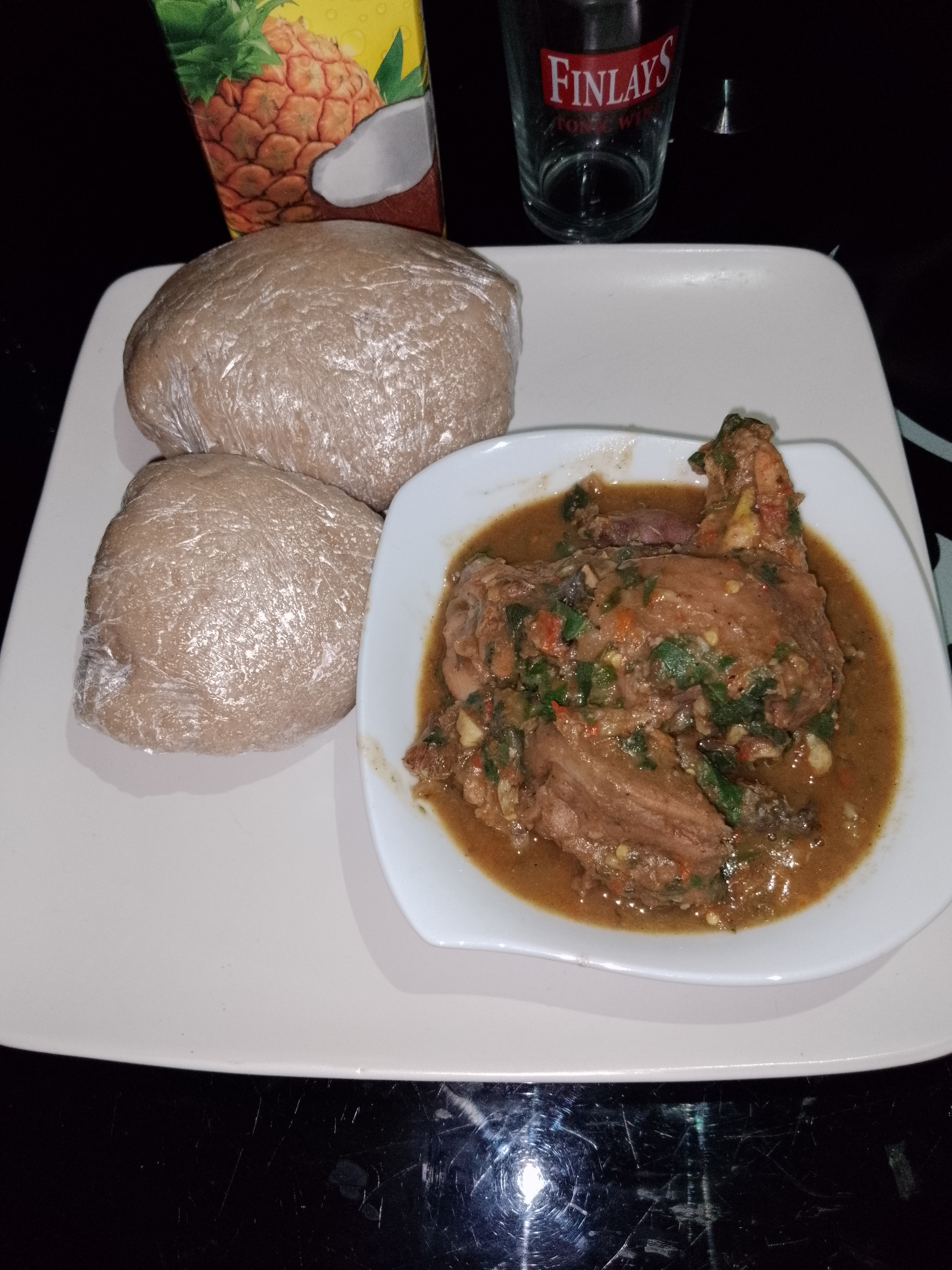
Ofe Nsala and Ụtara akpu

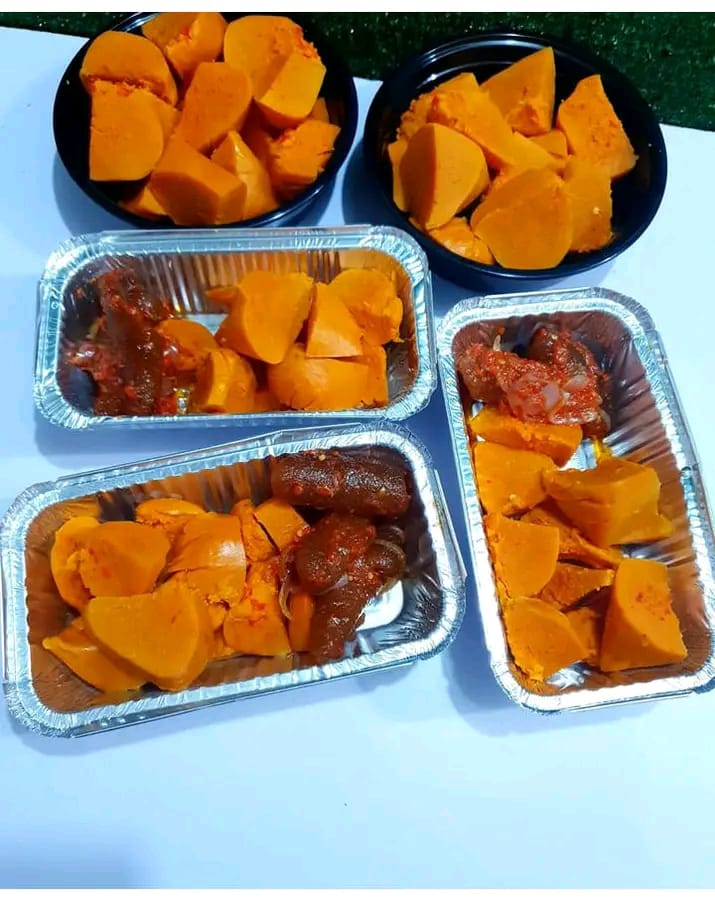
Okpa

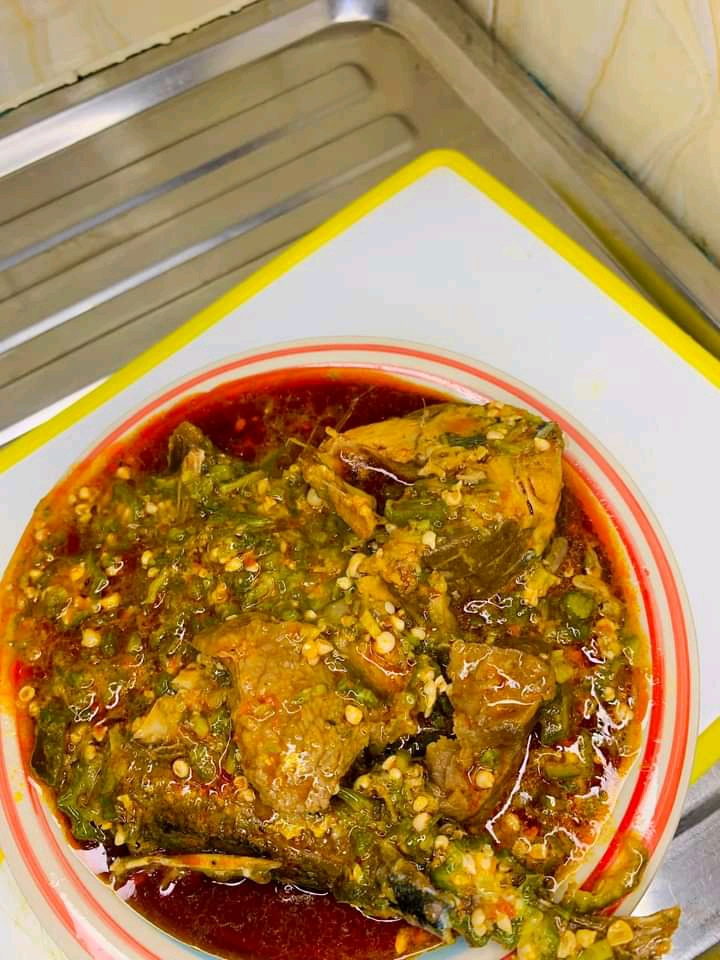
Okra soup

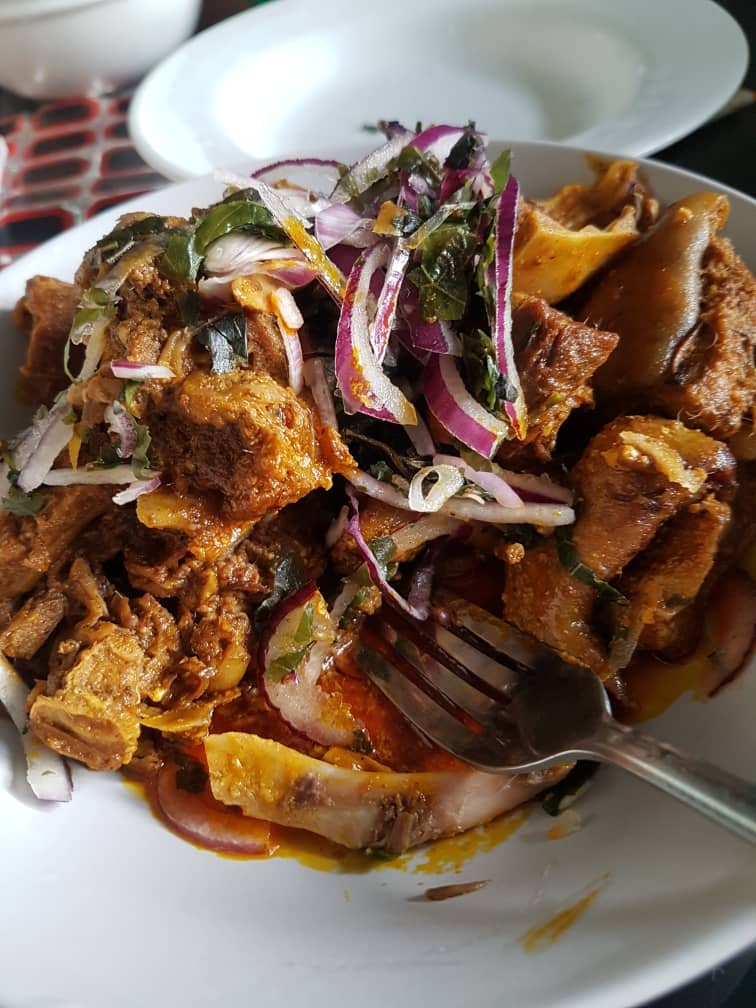
Nkwobi

Igbo cuisine is the various foods of the Igbo people of southeastern Nigeria.

The core of Igbo food is its soups. The popular soups are Ofe Oha, onugbu, ofe akwụ, egwusi, and nsala (white soup). Yam is a staple food for the Igbos and is eaten boiled or pounded with soups.

== Igbo foods ==
- Abacha
- Akpu
- Echicha
- Ofe Egwusi,
- Ofe Egburegbu
- Fio Fio
- Isi ewu
- Ofe Oha
- Ofe Ogbono
- Ofe Akwu
- Ofe Nsala
- Okpa
- Okra soup
- Palm wine
- Ukwa
- Ji akwụkwọ nri
- ji Awaii
- Mgbogho
- Ji mmiri Ọkụ (Yam pepper soup)
- Mpataka (Variation of Abacha)
- Osukwu
- Ukpo ogede
- Utara
- Ono/Ona
- Ugba Sauce

== Utara (Ụtara) ==
Utara ([ʊtàrà]) (also called Nri Onuno) is the general Igbo term for any starchy food eaten by swallowing without chewing, typically served alongside soup. It is considered the most popular and widely consumed food category in Igbo cuisine.

The most common types include:

- Utara ji (Àsụrụàsụ ji in Ngwa) — made from pounded yam (Dioscorea), considered the most prestigious variety and central to Igbo ceremonial life; also given to nursing mothers as it is believed to increase breast milk flow
- Utara akpu (Nri akpu in Ngwa) — made from fermented cassava (Manihot esculenta), widely consumed across Eastern Nigeria; the fermentation process removes cyanide from the cassava before consumption
- Utara ede (Nri ede in Ngwa) — made from pounded ede oyibo (Xanthosoma sagittifolium), the larger white cocoyam variety with a yam-like texture, distinct from ede uri/uli (Colocasia esculenta), the smaller variety used as a soup thickener rather than a swallow; cocoyam is recommended for diabetic patients due to its low sugar and high calcium content
- Utara oka — made from corn (maize) flour, also known as Nni/nri Oka
- Utara une/ogede (Àsụrụàsụ àbịrịkà in Ngwa) — made from pounded or dried unripe plantain (Musa paradisiaca); highly recommended for diabetic patients and also prepared as a porridge (Ọtọàbịrịkà) due to its high iron content
- Utara ukwa oyibo — made from jackfruit (Artocarpus heterophyllus), known in Igbo as ukwa oyibo meaning "foreign breadfruit", less common due to the fruit's high moisture content and perishable nature; the unripe variety is valued for its low glycaemic properties and has been shown to reduce fasting blood glucose levels in people with type 2 diabetes
- Utara garri (Garị in Ngwa) — made from garri (processed cassava flakes), the most widely available and affordable variety across Nigeria; prepared by soaking in boiled water and stirring until a stiff dough forms

== Osukwu (Plantain Porridge) ==
Osukwu is a kind of plantain porridge native to Igbo people of southeastern Nigeria. It is a traditional Igbo dish prepared from unripe or semi-ripe plantains cooked in palm oil sauce. In some Igbo dialects, plantain is known as ogede or ojoko.

The dish is prepared by peeling and cutting plantains into pieces before boiling them with ingredients such as palm oil, crayfish, dried fish, okporoko (stockfish), salt, pepper, and ogiri. Ugu leaves are usually added toward the end of cooking.

== Ukpo-ogede (Plantain Pudding) ==
Ukpo ogede (also spelled ukpa ogede) is a traditional Igbo steamed plantain pudding native to the Igbo people of southeastern Nigeria. It is prepared from plantain flour or blended ripe plantain mixed with palm oil, crayfish, onions, pepper, salt, and vegetables such as ugu, before being steamed until firm. The FAO study of the Igbo traditional food system noted the dish for its beta-carotene, iron, and zinc content.

== Àhụrụàhụ àbịrịkà (Roasted Plantain) ==
Àhụrụàhụ àbịrịkà (Roasted Plantain) in Ngwa dialect) is a popular street food and household dish among the Igbo people of southeastern Nigeria. Both ripe and unripe plantains can be roasted.

The plantain is roasted whole or cut into pieces over an open fire or on a wire gauze. When cooked, the outer burnt skin is scraped off and the plantain is cut into pieces and eaten by dipping into fresh palm oil mixed with salt, pepper, onions and shredded basil leaves or ụtàzị (a local herb that is slightly bitter in taste). Roasted plantain can be eaten at any time of the day and is used locally to treat cases of high blood pressure and diabetes.

== Èghèrèèghè àbịrịkà (Fried Plantain) ==
Èghèrèèghè àbịrịkà (Fried Plantainin Ngwa dialect) is one of the most widely consumed plantain dishes among the Igbo people of southeastern Nigeria. It can be prepared from both ripe and unripe plantains.

The plantain is prepared by cutting ripe or unripe plantains into small pieces, sprinkling some salt on the cut pieces, then putting them into hot palm oil or groundnut oil for frying. The unripe fried plantain can be eaten as plantain chips. The ripe fried plantain can be eaten with stew, vegetable or egg sauce. Palm wine can be taken as a drink after the meal for non-diabetic persons, while water is recommended for every other person.

== Ono / Ona (Three Leaves Yam) ==
Ọnọ (also known as ji Ọnà or ji una in many Igbo-speaking areas) is the Igbo name for the three-leaved yam, known scientifically as Dioscorea dumetorum and called bitter yam, cluster yam or trifoliate yam in English. It is native to sub-Saharan Africa and especially common in the tropical regions of West Africa including Nigeria.

Ọnọ has both domesticated and wild varieties. The domesticated variety is edible while the wild variety contains toxic alkaloids including dihydrodioscorine and dioscorine which must be removed by soaking and boiling in water before consumption. Among the Igbo it is regarded as food for adults and serves as a food of choice for diabetic patients as well as a herb for the treatment of various ailments.

Traditionally ọnọ is cooked and left overnight rather than eaten the same day. It is served the following day with ngu (also called ncha na ugba), a traditional Igbo sauce prepared with wood potash (akanwu), red palm oil, ugba (fermented oil bean seed), ogiri (fermented locust bean), salt and seasoning. One notable characteristic of ọnọ is that if a freshly harvested tuber is not cooked immediately after cutting it becomes hard over time and increasingly difficult to cook, a phenomenon that limits its shelf life and contributes to its underutilization despite its high nutritional value.
