= Asaro (food) =

Traditional Yoruba dish made with yams and spices

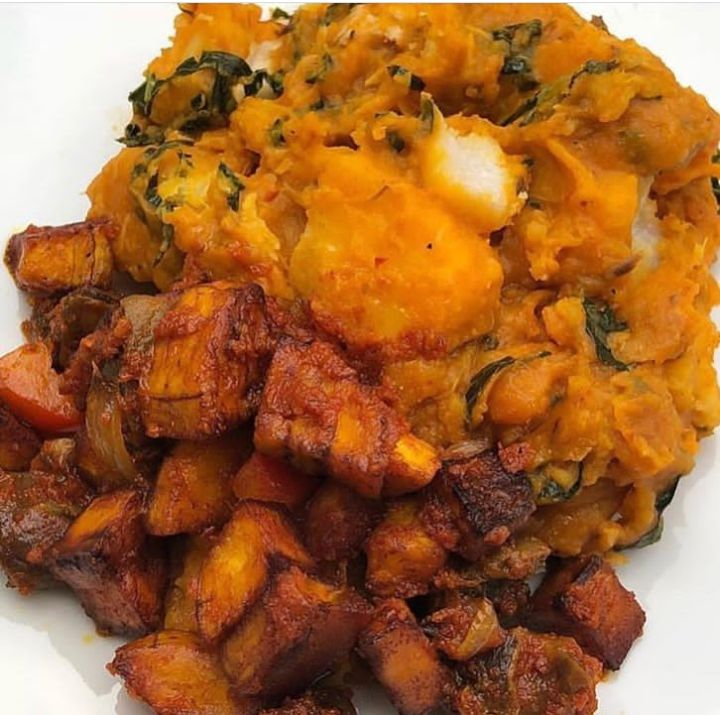
- Asaro with dodo
- Place of origin: Yoruba people
- Region or state: West Africa
- Main ingredients: Yam (vegetable)

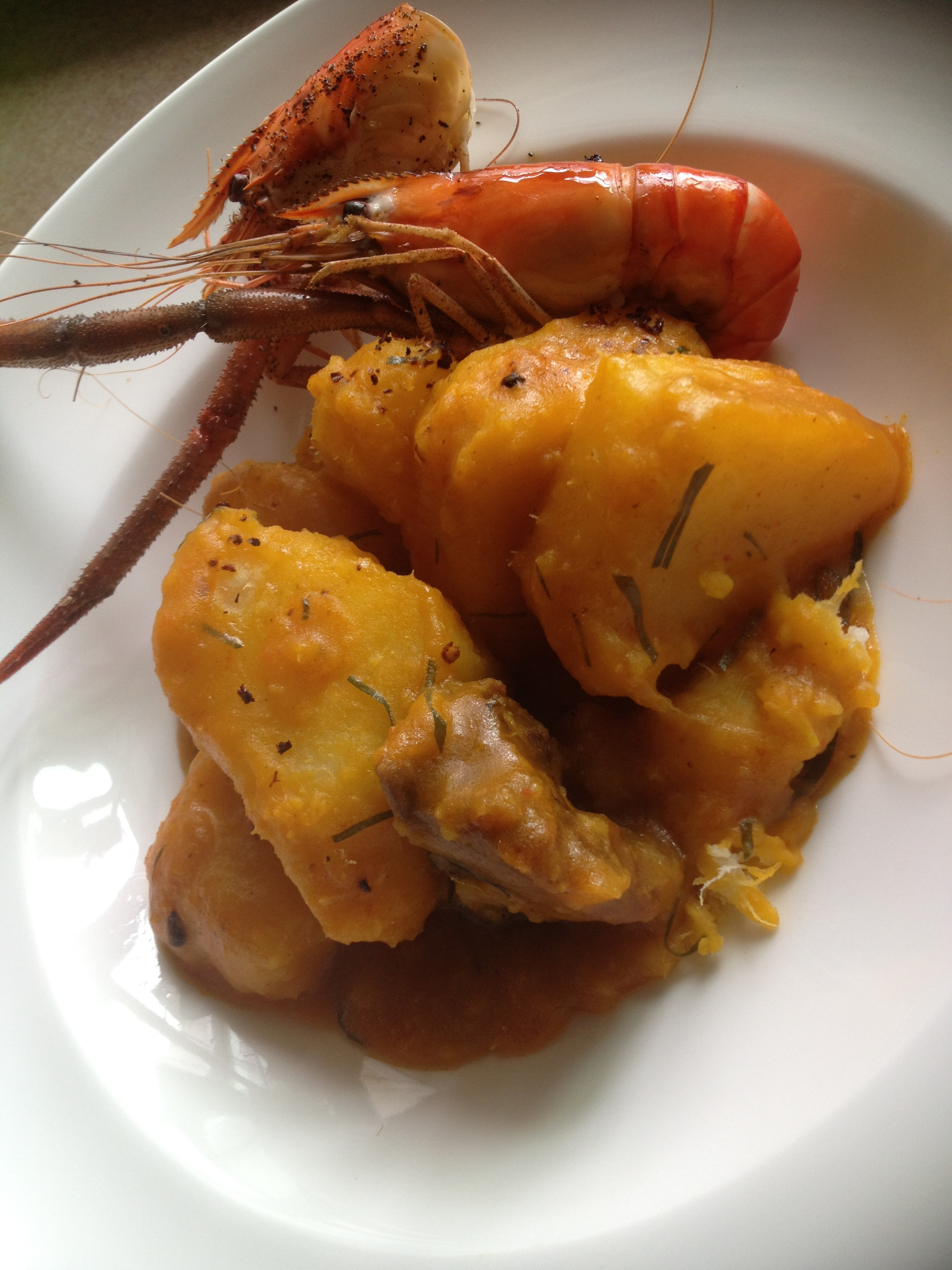
Asaro with big prawns

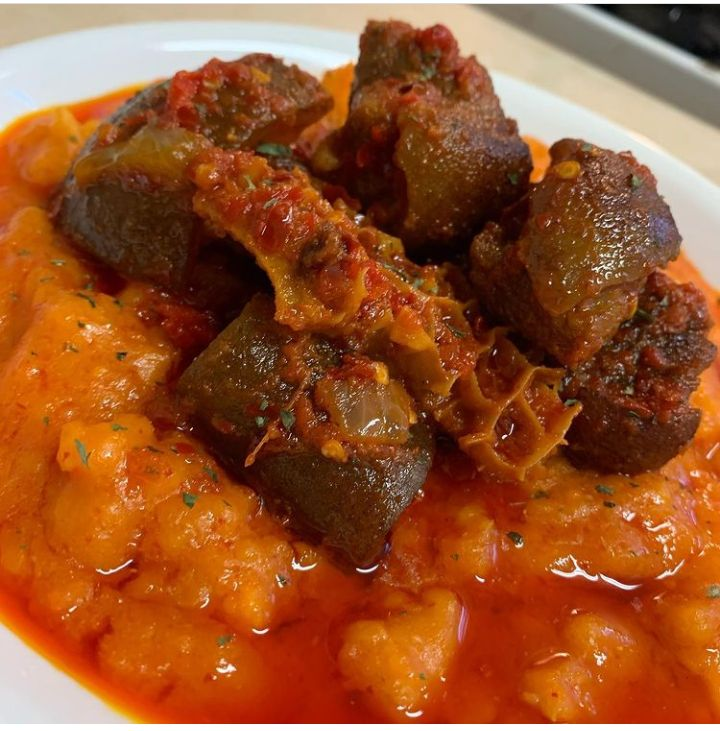
Asaro with beef, saki (tripe, pronounced "shaki") and ponmo (also known as kpomo, prepared cow skin)

Asaro, is a type of yam porridge or yam pottage. It is a traditional dish originating from the Yoruba of Nigeria, Benin Republic and Togo. It is a one-pot meal made from yam, a starchy tuber, and a variety of other ingredients. It can be eaten as a main course or a side dish.

== Ingredients and preparation ==
The primary ingredient in asaro is yam, which is peeled, cut into chunks, and boiled until it becomes soft. Other essential ingredients include red palm oil, onions, peppers, salt and a mixture of spices, which are combined in a pot. The dish is often prepared with a generous amount of palm oil, providing its characteristic reddish-orange color and its smoky and nutty flavour.

It is seasoned with spices like whole crayfish, crayfish powder, smoked fish, and bouillon cubes for added flavor. Garlic and ginger can also be added. Asaro may also include vegetables like scent leaf or spinach.

The dish may be served hot or warm, garnished with chopped parsley or cilantro if desired. It can come paired with boiled egg, fried or grilled fish, chicken or meat, or dodo.

== Variations ==
Asaro comes in various regional and personal variations. Some may include ingredients like eggs, whole crayfish (Ede) or plantains, or meats such as goat, cow tripe, or chicken.

== See also ==
- Ikokore
- Ji akwụkwọ nri
