= Bitter yam =

Bitter yam is a common name for several species of yam and may refer to:

- Dioscorea bulbifera, native to Africa and Asia
- Dioscorea dumetorum, native to Africa
