= Fio Fio =

Pigeon pea soup

- Alternative names: Agbugbù
- Type: Traditional Igbo dish
- Place of origin: South East (Nigeria)
- Region or state: Igbo people
- Serving temperature: Warm
- Main ingredients: Pigeon peas; Cocoyam; Yam; Palm oikl
- Ingredients generally used: Onions; Ugba; Crayfish

Fio Fio (//) (Igbo: Agbugbù). it is a popular Igbo delicacy, especially from the South-Eastern part of Nigeria like Enugu State and Nsukka area. The main ingredients are pigeon peas (the "fio fio" beans/legume, which are protein-rich), often combined with cocoyam in forms like achicha/dried cocoyam flakes or fresh), yam, palm oil, onions, pepper, crayfish, ugba(ukpaka/oil bean), scent leaves or utazi and sometimes dried fish or other proteins.

People commonly refer to it as "Agbugbu" or cook it as a thick, spicy, nutritious porridge that's usually eaten with yam, cocoyam, or on its own. It's hearty, filling, and considered a local "food for kings" in some descriptions because of its richness.

== Origin ==
The Pigeon pea soup originates from the southeastern Nigeria and is eaten with yam or cocoyam as a local delicacy popular in Enugu State.

It is prepared with palm oil, dried fish, and ukpaka.

== Overview ==
The other ingredients in making fio fio include scent leaf, crayfish, palm oil, and Ugba. Pigeon pea is cooked until soft and fried alongside achicha (cocoyam paste). Fio fio is popular among the Nsukka, Aguleri, Enugu, and communities around the Omambala area.

While it is called fio fio or agbugbu in Igbo, it is also known as otili in Yoruba, aduwa in Hausa, gungo peas in Jamaica, and mbaazi in Kenya.

== See also ==
- Igbo cuisine
- List of African cuisine
- guinea pea
