= Echicha =

Nigerian dish originating in Southeastern Nigeria

Ẹchịcha
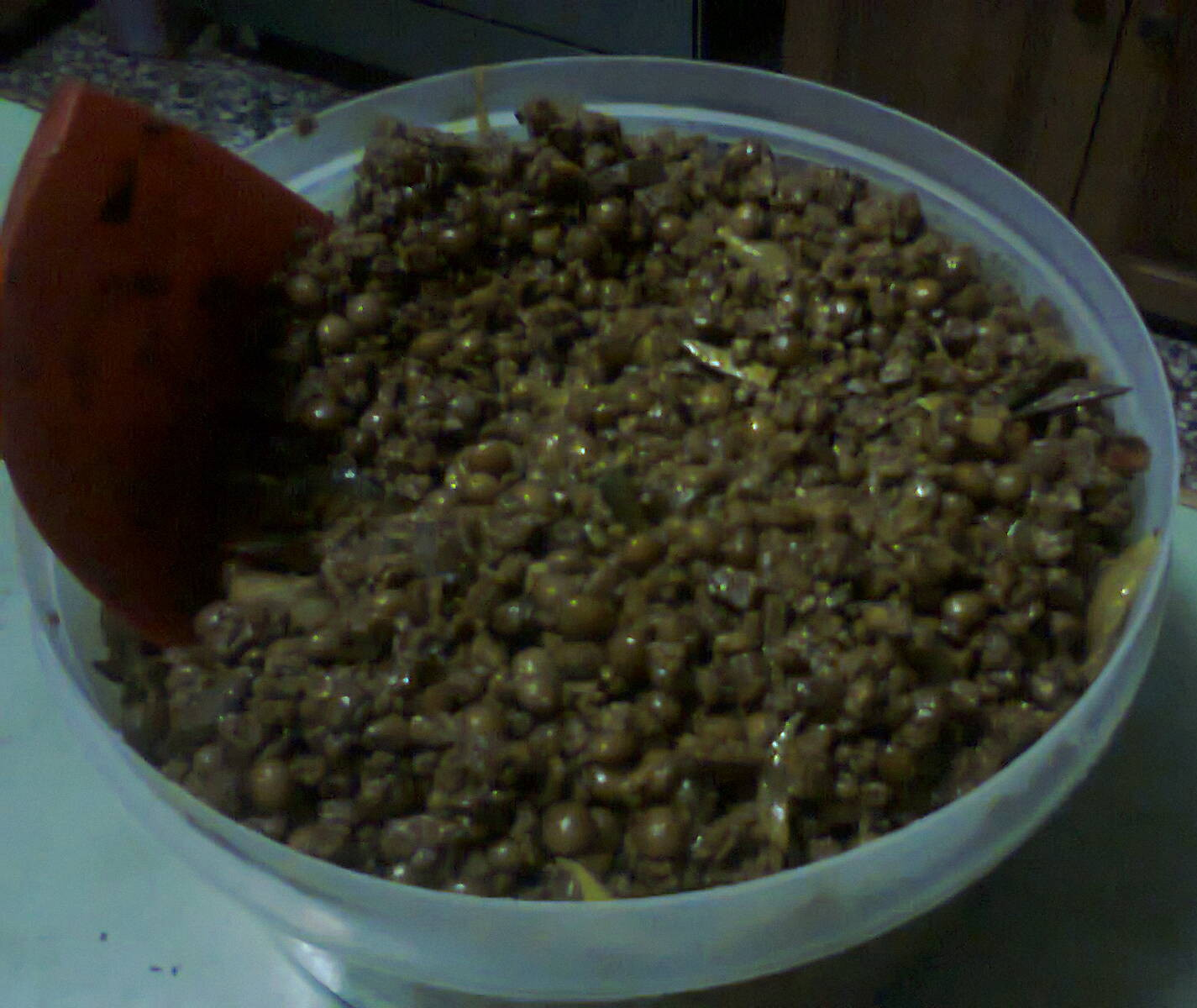
- A bowl of ẹchịcha
- Alternative names: Achịcha
- Place of origin: Nigeria
- Region or state: Igboland
- Main ingredients: Dried Cocoyam, Mgbụmgbụ

Ẹchịcha (also, Achịcha) // is a dish native to the Igbo part of Nigeria consisting mainly of dried Cocoyam, mgbụmgbụ (Pigeon pea), and palm oil. It is traditionally eaten in the dry season when fresh vegetables are hard to come by.

Ẹchịcha is made by steaming the dried cocoyam and mgbụmgbụ until they are soft, then mixing the two thoroughly with a sauce made of palm oil, ụgba (seed of the oil bean tree), onions, fresh pepper, and salt.

== See also ==
- Igbo cuisine
- List of African dishes
