= Ugba sauce =

Nigerian traditional sauce

- Ugba (Sliced African Oil Bean Seed)
- Type: Sauce
- Place of origin: Igbo, southeastern Nigeria
- Region or state: South East
- Serving temperature: hot or cold
- Main ingredients: Palm oil, Onions, Pepper, Sliced Ugba, Crayfish
- Ingredients generally used: Water

Ugba sauce is a traditional sauce eaten by the Igbo and Efik people of southern Nigeria. Ugba, also known as African oil bean, is called Ugba or Ukpaka in Igbo, Ukana by the Efik and Apara in Yoruba. The sauce is prepared and eaten across Nigeria.

== Overview ==
The trees primarily grow in southern and eastern Nigeria, as well as along the coastal regions of West Africa. The seeds are processed by boiling, dehulling and then fermenting them. Ugba seeds are primarily sold in markets that specializes in Igbo foods. The following ingredients are commonly used to prepare the sauce:

- Palm oil
- Utazi
- Onions
- Pepper
- Tomatoes
- Garlic
- Crayfish
- Protein of choice
- Ugba
- Kale
- Salt

The sauce can be served with yam, and its distinctive peppery flavor compliments the yam.

== See also ==
- Nigerian cuisine
- Igbo cuisine
