= Okpa =

Nigerian steamed bean pudding

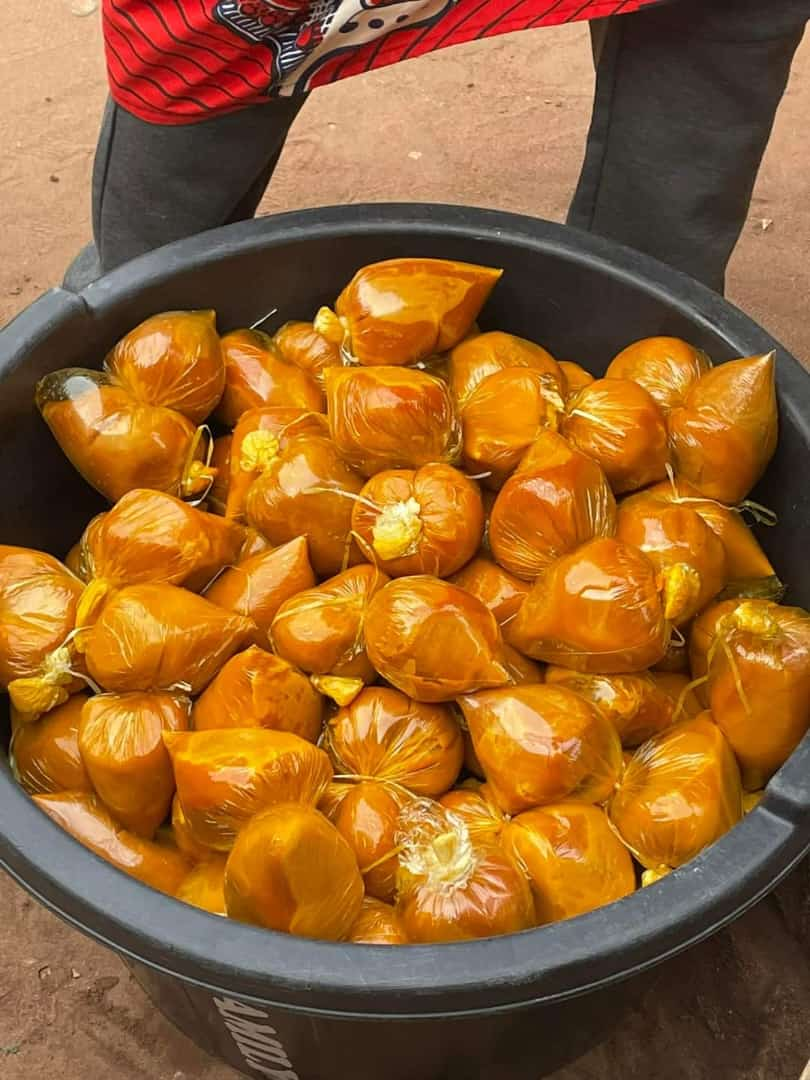
- Place of origin: Southeast Nigeria (Igboland)
- Region or state: South East
- Serving temperature: Hot
- Main ingredients: Okpa Flour Bambara nuts; Habanero Pepper; Palm oil
- Ingredients generally used: Crayfish; Onions; Scent Leaves

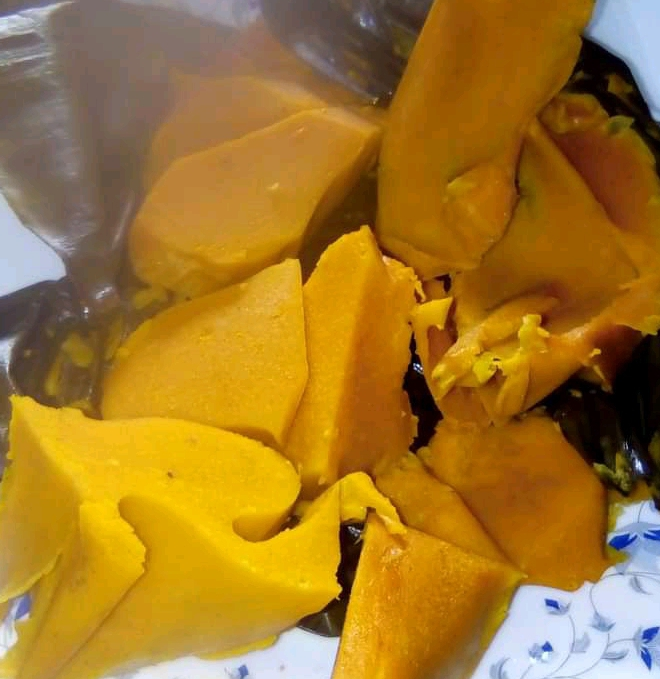
Okpa

Okpa // (pronounced Ọkpa) is a dish prepared by the Igbo people with a type of beans known as bambara nuts. It is common the South-Eastern region in Nigeria and classified as a traditional Igbo cuisine. Other ethnic groups also eat it (with pap or soft drinks like (coca cola). Other Igbo names for okpa include ịgba and ntucha. In Hausa, it is known as gurjiya or kwaruru.

The main ingredients in okpa are bambara nut flour, pepper, palm oil and seasoning. It is prepared with pumpkin leaves and scent leaf. Nutritionally, okpa has approximately 16.92% crude protein, 4.93% fat, 26.62% carbohydrate and 216.28 kcal energy value, making it one of the most balanced staples.

== Preparations ==
Okpa is prepared by washing banana or plantain leaves to wrap it. It is also made by mixing Okpa flour, crayfish (which is optional), salt, and seasonings in a large bowl. Palm oil is added, and a spatula is used to achieve a reddish-yellow color. It can be served hot with Pepsi, custard, oatmeal, or pap.

== Health benefits ==
Okpa offers various nutritional values such as calcium, fiber, iron, potassium, methionine, and other nutrients. These benefits include its high levels of fatty acids, such as palmitic and linoleic acids, when compared to groundnut. Palmitoleic acid has been reported to have beneficial effects on insulin sensitivity, cholesterol metabolism, and hemostasis.

== Gallery ==
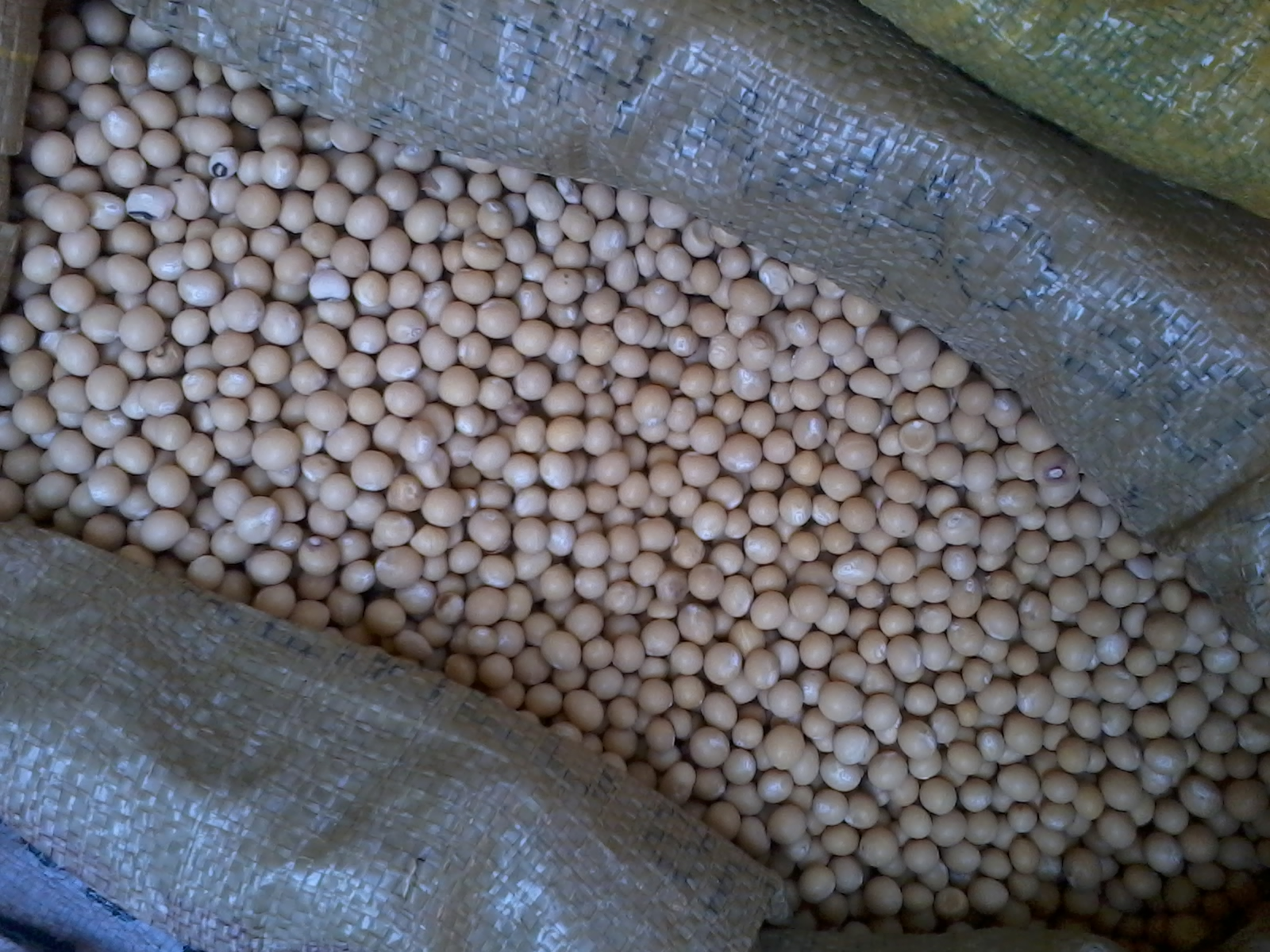

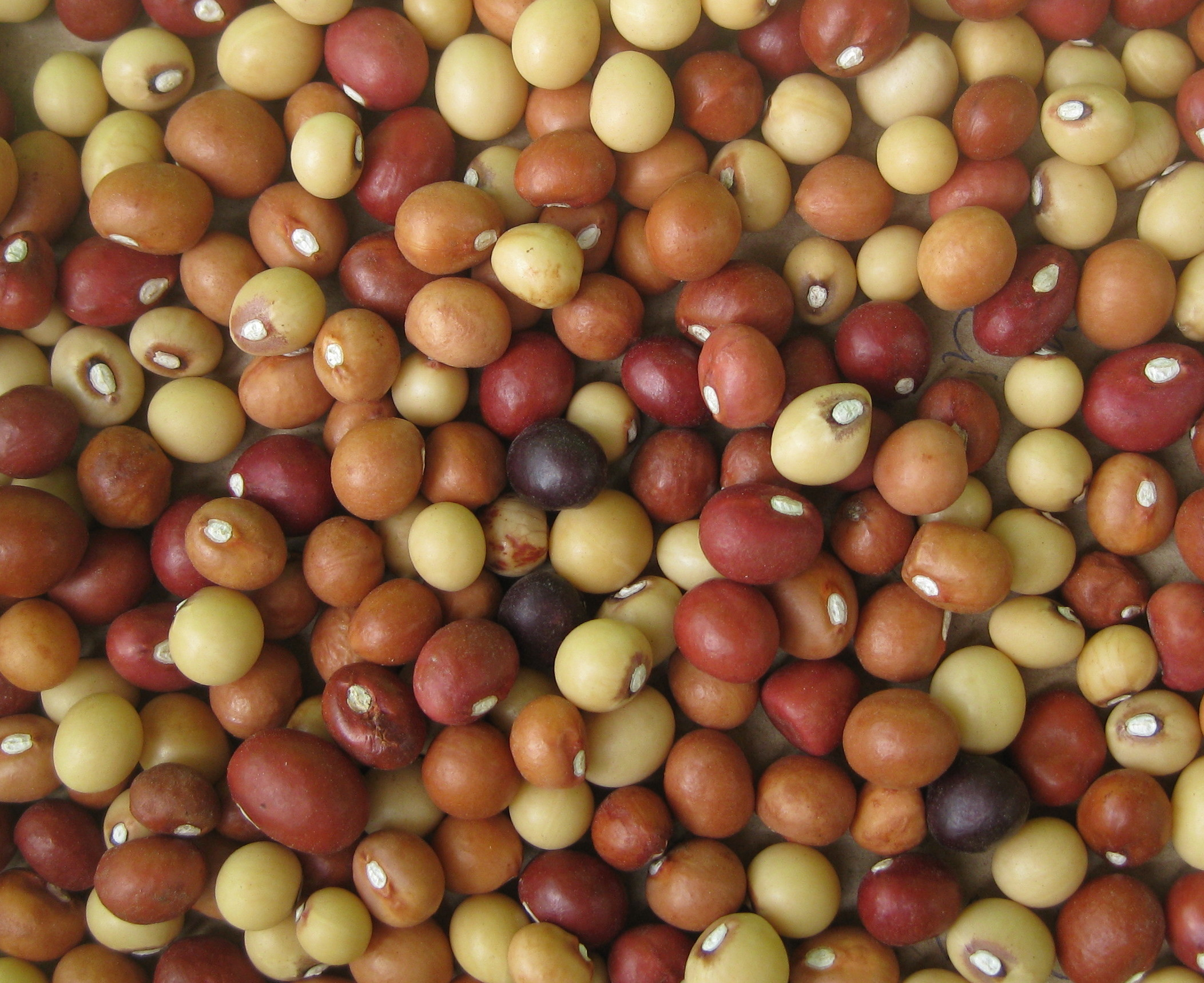
Bambara groundnuts used in preparing Okpa

== See also ==
- Nigerian cuisine
- Bambara groundnut
- Moin-moin
