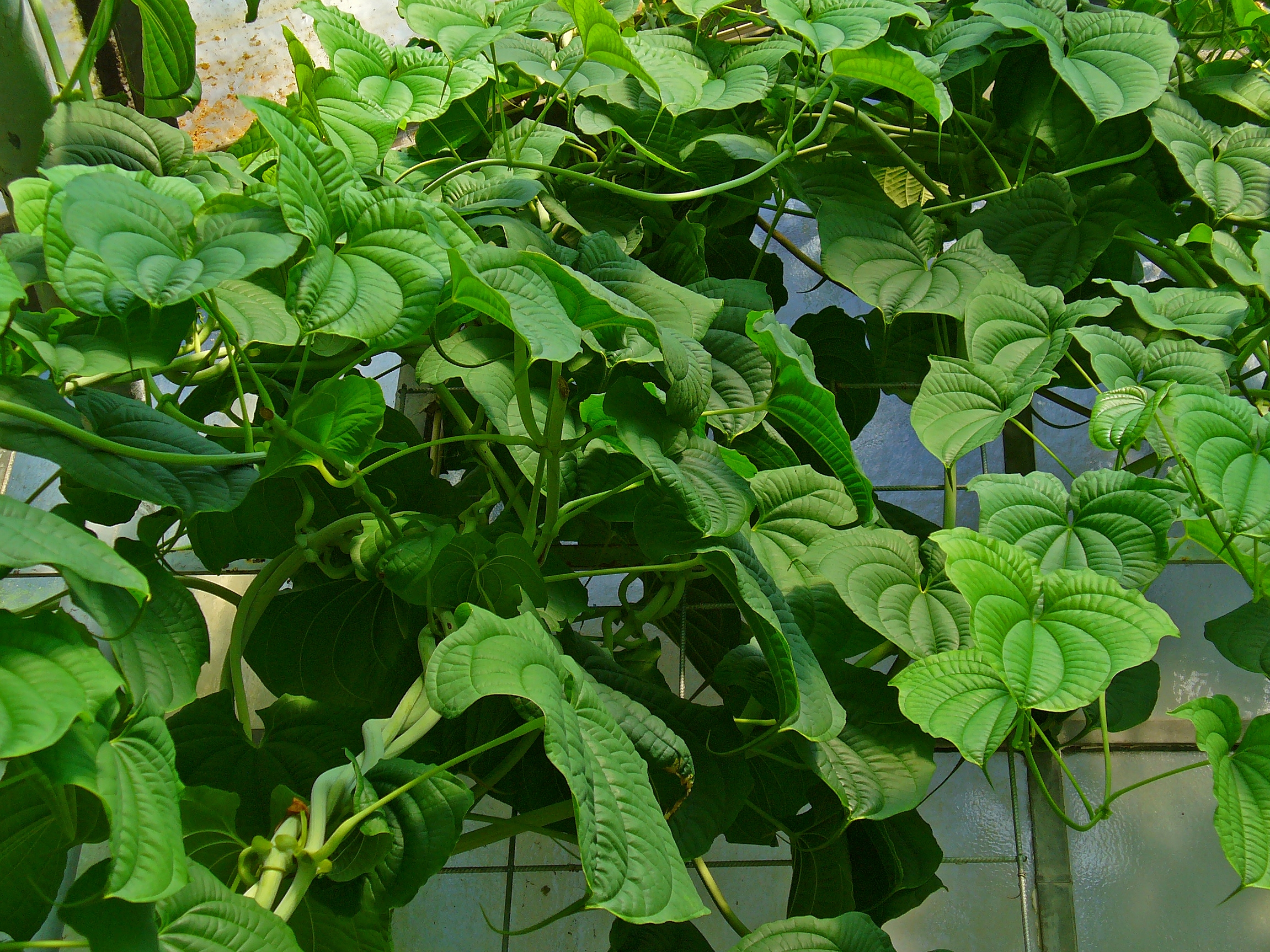

Scientific classification
- Kingdom: Plantae
- Clade: Tracheophytes
- Clade: Angiosperms
- Clade: Monocots
- Order: Dioscoreales
- Family: Dioscoreaceae
- Genus: Dioscorea
- Species: D. esculenta

Binomial name
- Dioscorea esculenta (Lour.) Burkill

Synonyms
- List: Oncorhiza esculentus (Lour.) Pers.; Oncus esculentus Lour.; Dioscorea aculeata Roxb.; Dioscorea aculeata var. spinosa (Prain) Roxb. ex Prain & Burkill; Dioscorea esculenta var. fasciculata (Roxb.) Prain & Burkill; Dioscorea esculenta var. fulvidotomentosa R.Knuth; Dioscorea esculenta var. spinosa (Prain) R.Knuth; Dioscorea esculenta var. tiliifolia (Kunth) Fosberg & Sachet; Dioscorea fasciculata Roxb.; Dioscorea fasciculata var. spinosa Prain; Dioscorea papillaris Blanco; Dioscorea papuana Warb.; Dioscorea spinosa Roxb. ex Hook.f.; Dioscorea tiliifolia Kunth; Dioscorea tugui Blanco

= Dioscorea esculenta =

Species of yam

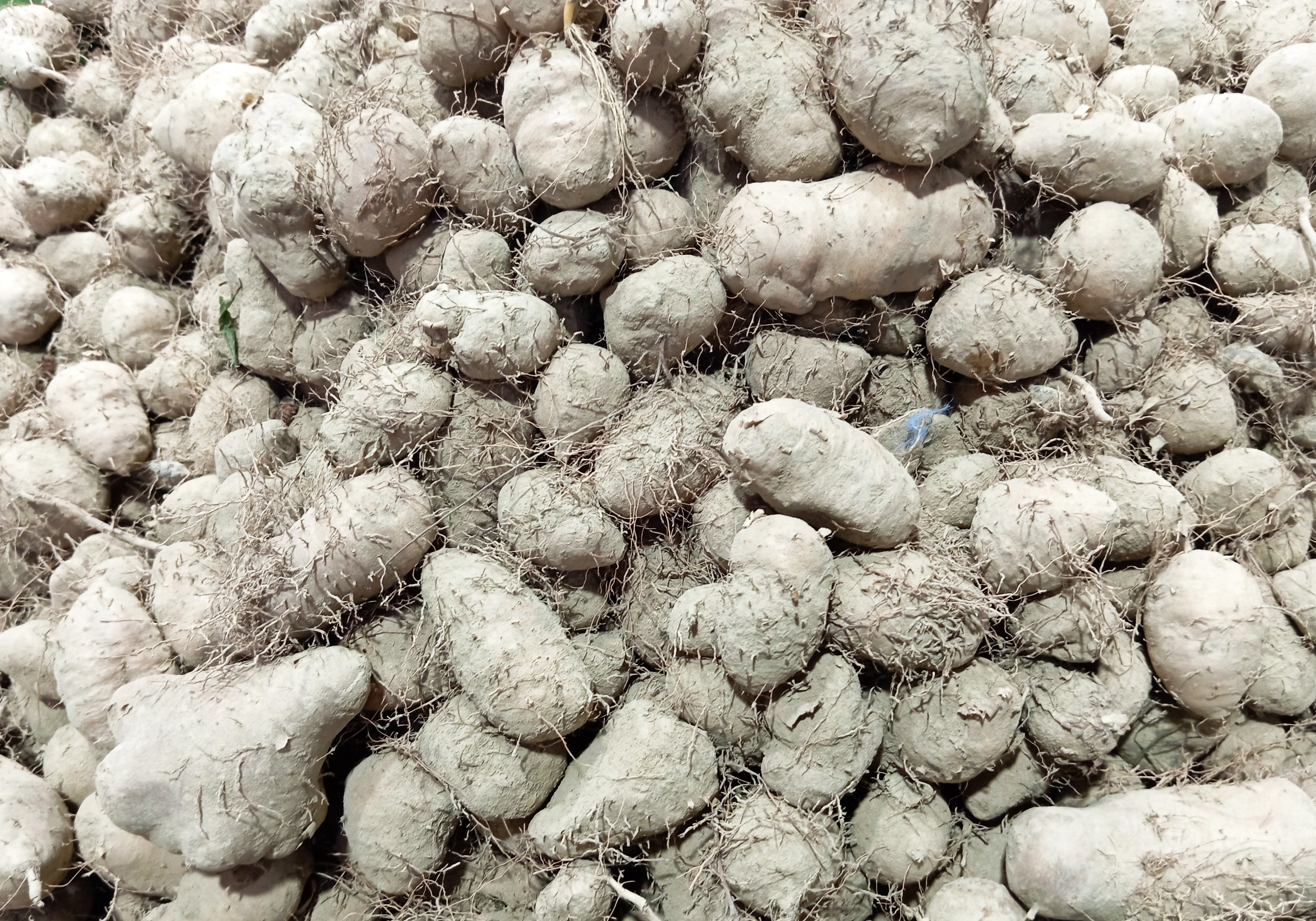
Lesser yam (Dioscorea esculenta)

Dioscorea esculenta is a species of flowering plant in the family Dioscoreaceae. It is sometimes referred to by the common name lesser yam, and is native to Island Southeast Asia and introduced to Near Oceania and East Africa by early Austronesian voyagers. This yam is grown for its edible tubers, though it has smaller tubers than the more widely-cultivated Dioscorea alata and is usually spiny.

== Names ==
In Javanese, and particularly in Bahasa Indonesia, it is called gembili. In Tagalog, it is known as tugi, while in Cebuano it is called apali. It is cultivated in Kerala, Goa, Konkan parts of Maharashtra India. In Malayalam, it is known as nana kizhangu or nheruvalli kizhangu or "Cheru Kizhangu". In Goa it is called Kaate Kanaga (काटे कणगा ), It is a climber which needs support and goes coiling around the support.

== History of cultivation ==
The lesser yam is the second most important yam crop among Austronesians. Like D. alata, it requires minimal processing, unlike the other more bitter yam species. However, it has smaller tubers than D. alata and is usually spiny. Like D. alata it was introduced to Madagascar and the Comoros by Austronesians, where it spread to the East African coast. They are also a dominant crop in Near Oceania, However, it did not reach to the furthest islands in Polynesia, being absent in Hawaii and New Zealand.

Starch grains identified to be from the lesser yam have been recovered from archaeological sites of the Lapita culture in Viti Levu, Fiji, dated to around 3,050 to 2,500 cal BP. D. esculenta is believed to have been introduced by the Lapita culture into New Guinea, along with agricultural innovations like wet cultivation. Traces of D. esculenta (along with D. alata, D. bulbifera, D. nummularia and D. pentaphylla) yams have also been identified from the Mé Auré Cave site in Moindou, New Caledonia, dated to around 2,700 to 1,800 BP. Remains of D. esculenta have also been recovered from archaeological sites in Guam, dated to around 1031 CE.

== Taxonomy ==
Belonging to the genus Dioscorea, Dioscorea esculenta describes the plant's ability to produce edible roots.

== Description ==
The plant's stems are round and thin, with big, black compound spines that are 2–4 cm long. The leaves are soft, heart-shaped, and 5–8 cm long and 6–8 cm wide.

== See also ==
- Domesticated plants and animals of Austronesia
- Yam production in Nigeria
