= Pterocarpus mildbraedii =

Scientific classification
- Kingdom: Plantae
- Clade: Tracheophytes
- Clade: Angiosperms
- Clade: Eudicots
- Clade: Rosids
- Order: Fabales
- Family: Fabaceae
- Subfamily: Faboideae
- Genus: Pterocarpus
- Species: P. mildbraedii

Binomial name
- Pterocarpus mildbraedii Harms

Species of plant

Pterocarpus mildbraedii is a semi-deciduous tree within the family Fabaceae. It is known as 'Oha' in Southeastern Nigeria and as 'Aguaya' in Ivory Coast.

== Description ==
A perennial and semi-deciduous non climbing tree which exists in two subspecies: The type subspecies is native to West Africa and can reach 25 m (82 ft) height and has a small rounded crown. The subspecies P. m. subsp. usumbarensis is endemic to the mountains of East Africa and grows much larger, up to 75 m (246 ft) height. The species bark is smooth but sometimes longitudinally cracked and greyish to pale brown in colour exuding a red latex. Leaves are alternate and imparipinnately compound, the younger leaves tend to be light green but upon maturity it becomes a darker shade of green. Leaflets are ovate to elliptical in shape, acuminate at the apex while rounded at the base, they can reach up to 14 cm long and 7 cm wide. The flowers are golden yellow and the fruit is a large obovate semi transparent pod that is up to 12 cm long.

== Distribution ==
It is distributed in West and Central Africa from Guinea to the Democratic Republic of Congo, and it is also found in the Usambara mountains of Tanzania.

== Uses ==
Leaves of the species are used as ingredients in the preparation of oha soup in Nigeria. Leaf extracts are also used in traditional medicine for pain management. However, studies have shown the leaves to be high on hydrogen cyanide and oxalate. In Ghana, it is considered to be suitable as a shade tree in cocoa plantations.
