= Yam production in Nigeria =

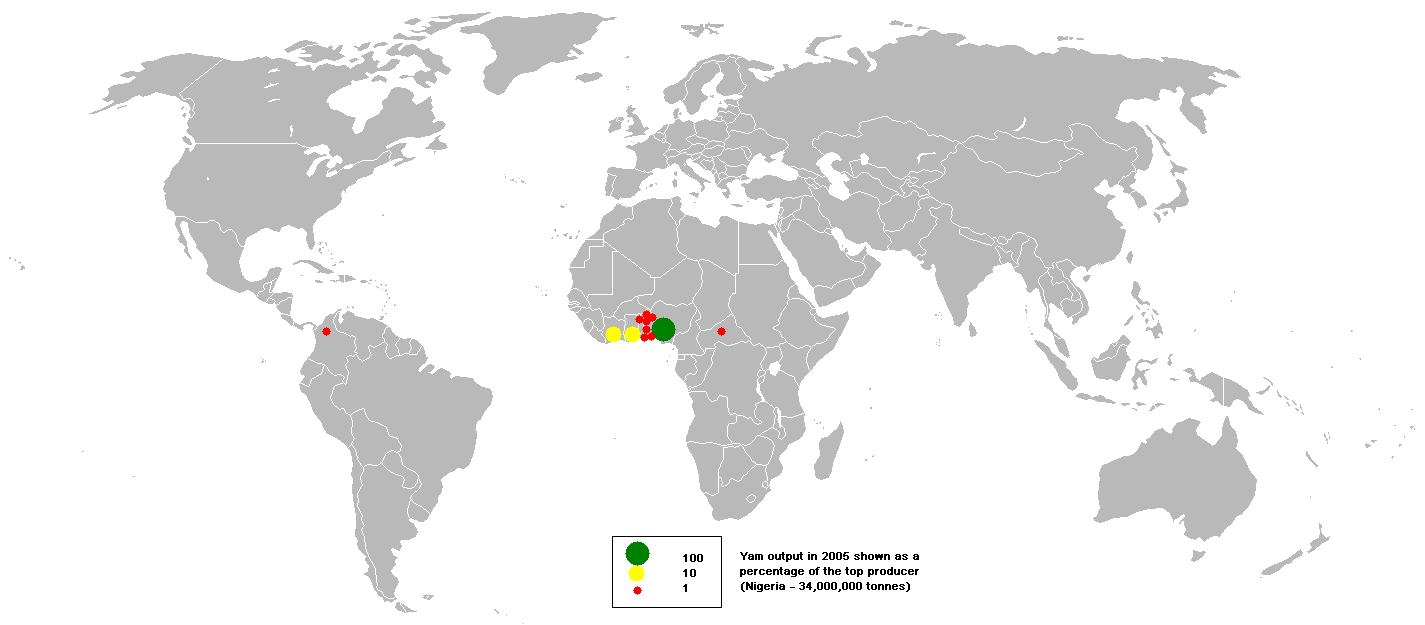
World yam production

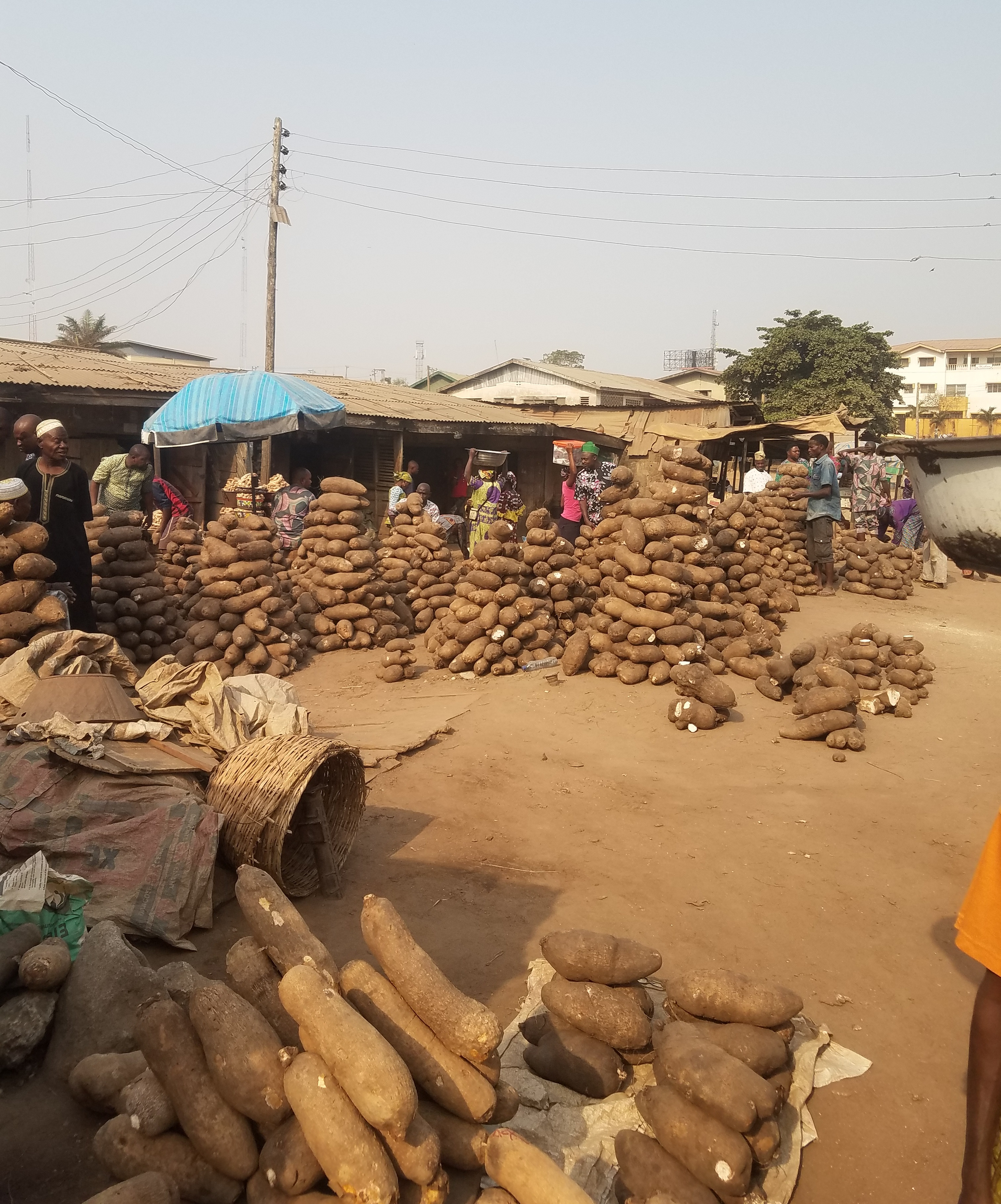
Yam in a market

Nigeria is by far the world’s largest producer of yams, accounting for over 70–76 percent of the world production. According to the Food and Agriculture Organization report, in the year 1985, Nigeria produced 18.3 million tonnes of yam from 1.5 million hectares, representing 73.8 percent of total yam production in Africa. According to the year 2008 figures, yam production in Nigeria has nearly doubled since 1985, with Nigeria producing 35.017 million metric tonnes with value equivalent of US$5.654 billion. In perspective, the world's second and third largest producers of yams, Côte d'Ivoire and Ghana, only produced 6.9 and 4.8 million tonnes of yams in 2008 respectively. According to the International Institute of Tropical Agriculture, Nigeria accounted for about 70 percent of the world production amounting to 17 million tonnes from land area 2,837,000 hectares under yam cultivation.

Yam is in the class of roots and tubers that is a staple of the Nigerian and West African diet, which provides some 200 calories of energy per capita daily. In Nigeria, in many yam-producing areas, it is said that "yam is food and food is yam". However, the production of yam in Nigeria is substantially short and cannot meet the growing demand at its present level of use. It also has an important social status in gatherings and religious functions, which is assessed by the size of yam holdings one possesses.

== Species ==
Yam, a tropical crop in the genus Dioscorea, has as many as 600 species out of which six are economically important staple species. These are:

- Dioscorea rotundata (white guinea yam) - closely related to Dioscorea cayennensis, another domesticated yam widely consumed in West Africa. Both are derived from the wild progenitor Dioscorea praehensilis.
- Dioscorea alata (purple yam) - originally from Oceania
- Dioscorea bulbifera (aerial yam) - cultivated primarily for its bulbils
- Dioscorea dumetorum (trifoliate yam) - similar to Dioscorea hispida
- Dioscorea esculenta (lesser yam, Chinese yam) - Asian origin

Out of these, Dioscorea rotundata (white yam) and Dioscorea alata (water yam) are the most common, and most economically important, species in Nigeria. Yams are grown in the coastal region in rain forests, wood savanna and southern savanna habitats.

Other tubers consumed in Nigeria:

- Cassava
- Sweet potato
- Hausa potato
- Livingstone potato
- Potato

== Geographic regions ==
Although it is grown widely in Nigeria, the area where it is grown most is Benue State (land area of 34,059 km^{2}), Taraba state, Niger State, Adamawa State and Nasarawa State. In these states especially among Tiv people, the size of the yam farm or the tonnage of yams produced becomes the social status of that farmer. Because of high level of yam production in the State of Benue, Benue State is crowned as the Nigerian food Basket. Yams are planted on mounds rather than flat slopes depending on the hydromorphic nature of the soils which are generally of loose soil suitable to grow roots and tuber crops. While yam production issues have been stressed on agronomical practices, a research study carried out on the economic efficiency of this crop grown in this region with small farm holdings, which is labour-intensive, reveals that land, labour and material (fertilizers and chemicals), credit and extension services inputs have a significant bearing on the yield of yam in the region.

The Zaki Biam International Yam market is the biggest market for a single product in Nigeria.

Yam is also farmed in Ekiti state. The farmland production system in Ekiti State consists of wetland (20% farms are under this category), upland (50% farms in this category) types and a combination of the two types (30% by the balance farms). A study carried out on the efficiency of the three systems to improve crop outputs to meet growing demands for this food crop, indicates that the "wetland yam based enterprises are the most economically efficient with mean economic efficiency of 0.80 followed by upland yam based enterprises with mean efficiency of 0.79." The combination of wetland/upland yam based enterprises is assessed as the least economically efficient, with mean efficiency of 0.76. Hence, it has been recommended that more yams should be grown more on wetlands. Another recommendation made is to adopt the yam minisett technology developed by the International Institute for Tropical Agriculture (IITA) and the National Root Crops Research Institute (NRCRI).

== Cultivation practices ==
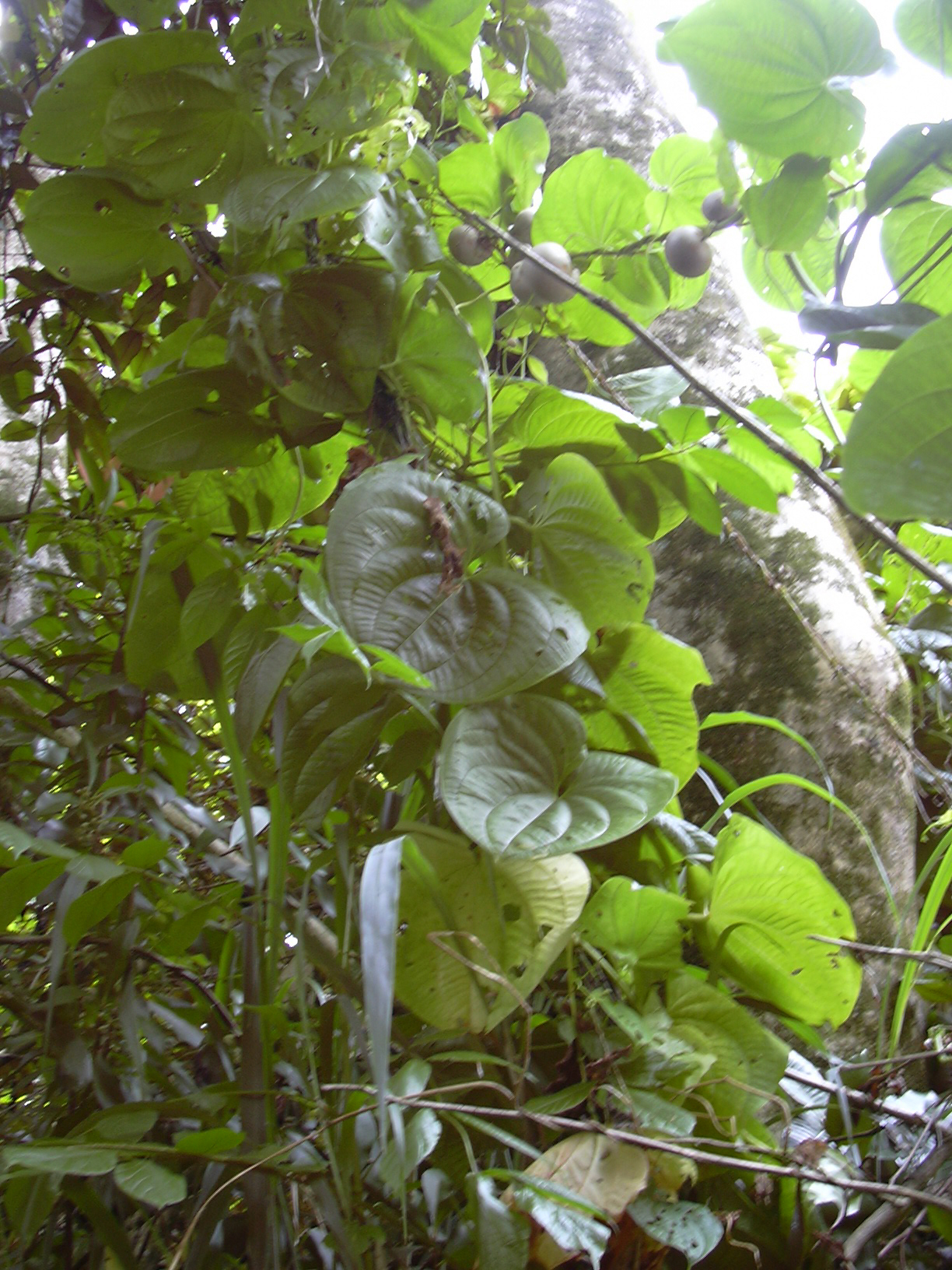
Dioscorea bulbifera

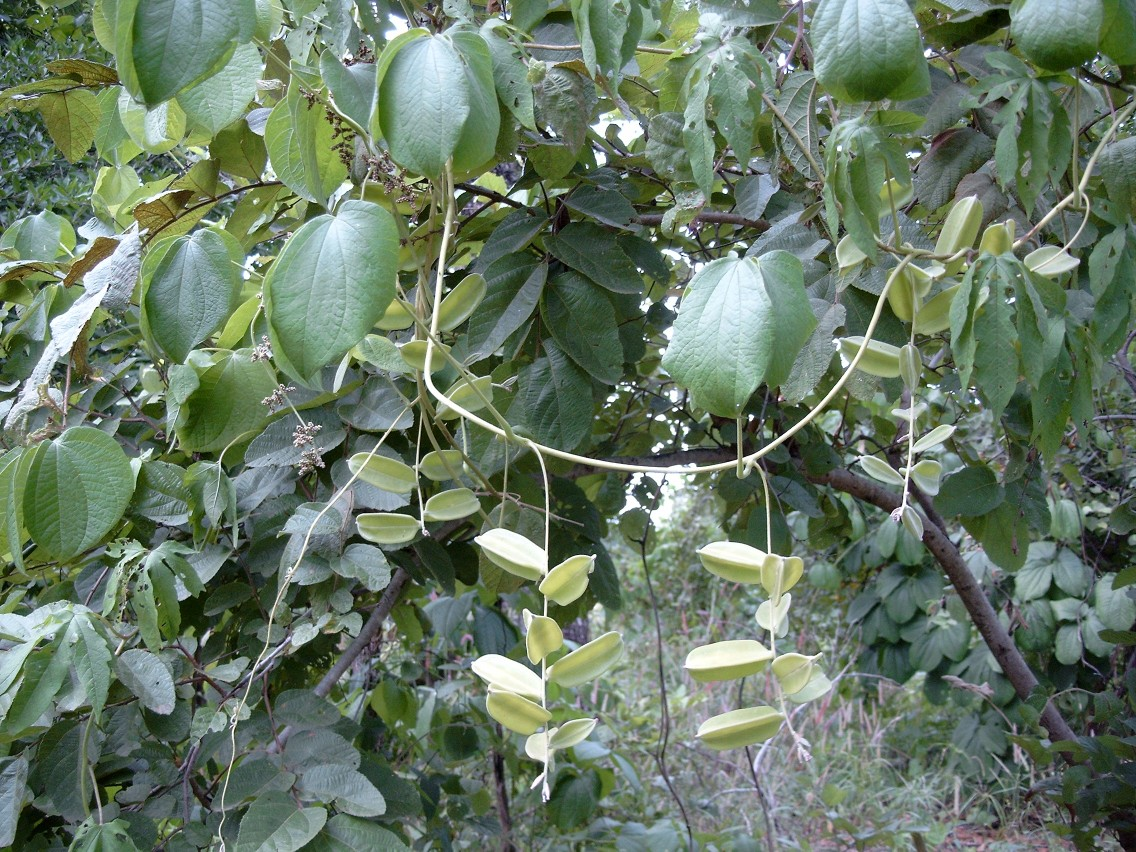
Dioscorea cf. dumetorum

Yam is grown on free draining, sandy and fertile soil, after clearing the first fallow. Land is prepared in the form of mound or ridge or heap of 1 metre (3 ft 3 in) height. The yams recommended for such soil conditions in Nigeria are white yam or white guinea yam (Discorea rotundata) and water yam or yellow yam (Discorea alata). Planting is done by seed yam or cut setts from ware tubers. A day before planting, the tubers have to be subjected to treatment with wood ash or a fungicide (thiabendazole) to prevent damage to the soils. The setts are planted at an interval of 15–20 centimetres (5.9–7.9 in) with the cut face facing up. Mulching is essential during October–November with dry grass or plant debris weighed down with balls of mud. Dosage of fertilizer application, as essential, is decided after chemical analysis of the soil samples. Manual weeding by hoeing is done three or four times depending on the rate of weed growth. Two stakes, each of 2 metres (6 ft 7 in) height are used for staking the plants to vine over it; one for two plants with the other used for bracing with the adjacent stakes. Sorghum stovers are also used for this purpose in the savannah land.

Pest and disease control is addressed by cultural control and chemical methods; the pests which affect the plant are nematodes such as root knot (Meloidogyne spp.) and yam nematode (Scutellonema bradys), and insects such as yam shoot beetle, yam tuber beetle and crickets. Weeding of the field is essential and maintaining a 2–3 metres (6 ft 7 in – 9 ft 10 in) weed free border around the field is to be ensured. Disease resistant cultivars are normally recommended for use. Harvesting is done before the vines become dry and soil becomes dry and hard. Generally, a yield of 10–15 tonnes per ha for white yam and 16–25 tonnes for water yam are obtained by following prescribed management practices. The harvested yams are stored by tying them with ropes. They have a shelf life of about 5 months. Warehouses where they are stored should be made rodent proof with a metal base and wire netting. Rotten buds and sprouted buds should be removed.

== Uses ==
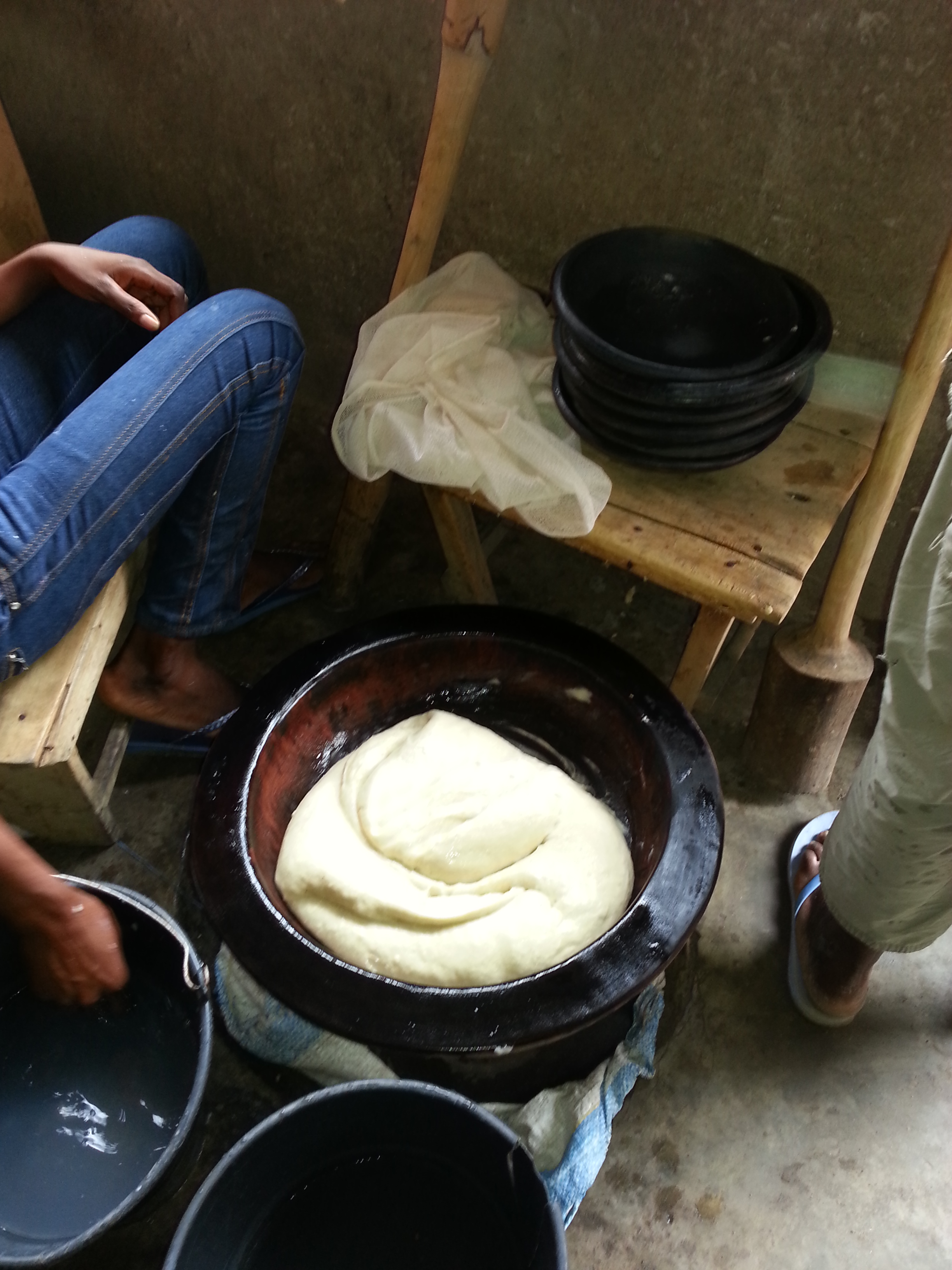
Pounded yam

The tuber is the main part of the yam plant which has high carbohydrate content (low in fat and protein) and provides a good source of energy. Unpeeled yam has vitamin C. Yam, sweet in flavour, is consumed boiled, as fufu, or fried in oil. It is often pounded into a thick paste after boiling and is consumed with soup. It is also processed into flour for use in the preparation of the paste. Its medicinal use as a heart stimulant is attributed to its chemical composition, which consists of alkaloids of saponin and sapogenin. Its use as an industrial starch has also been established as the quality of some of the species is able to provide as much starch as in cereals.

== Rituals and festivals ==
Ritualism and festivity restriction are also associated with yam, which is the staple in southeastern Nigeria. A yam festival is held every year to mark the harvesting of this crop. The village chiefs and traditional title holders of lands in Nigeria who grow yam make it a religious practice by not consuming yam until it is offered to the gods. During this festival, villagers offer prayers thanking their ancestral gods for the blessings of the land and the women's fertility. The festivity is observed in villages in the form of a parade of traditional dances.

== Leading yam agricultural regions, by state ==
- Benue state
- Taraba state
- Niger state
- Nasarawa state
- Adamawa state
- Cross River state
- Delta state
- Oyo state
- Ekiti state
- Edo state
- Imo state
- Kaduna state
- Kwara state
- Ogun state
- Osun state
- Ondo state
- Plateau state

According to the World Data atlas, Adamawa's yam production is at over 10,000 metric tons.

== Customs ==
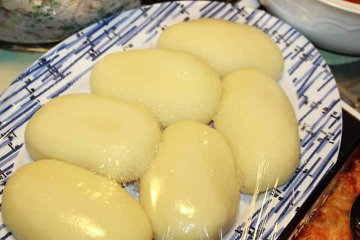
Wrapped yam fufu

In some communities in Nigeria, it is a custom to measure the bridegroom's wealth by the amount of yams that he can produce. According to tradition, the groom has to present a minimum of 200 big tubers of yams to the in-laws as a proof that he can take care of his wife and the future family.

Yams are depicted as a male totem in some areas of the Igbo land. Another custom observed is that women are not permitted to go to the yam farms until it is ready for harvesting; however, harvesting of the crop is the prerogative of the women.

== See also ==
- Cassava production in Nigeria
- Agriculture in Nigeria
- Yam (vegetable)
- Dioscorea
