= Cassava production in Nigeria =

How cassava is produced in Nigeria

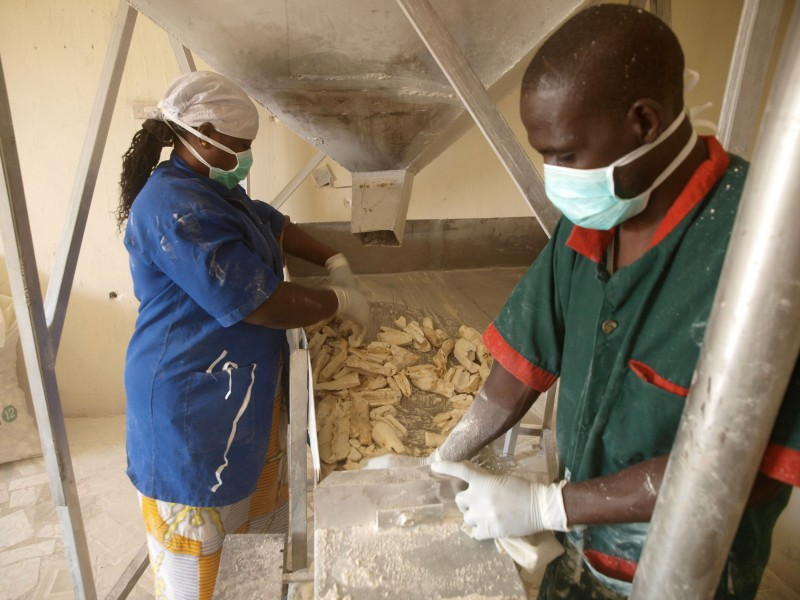
Cassava processing in Obudu, southern Nigeria

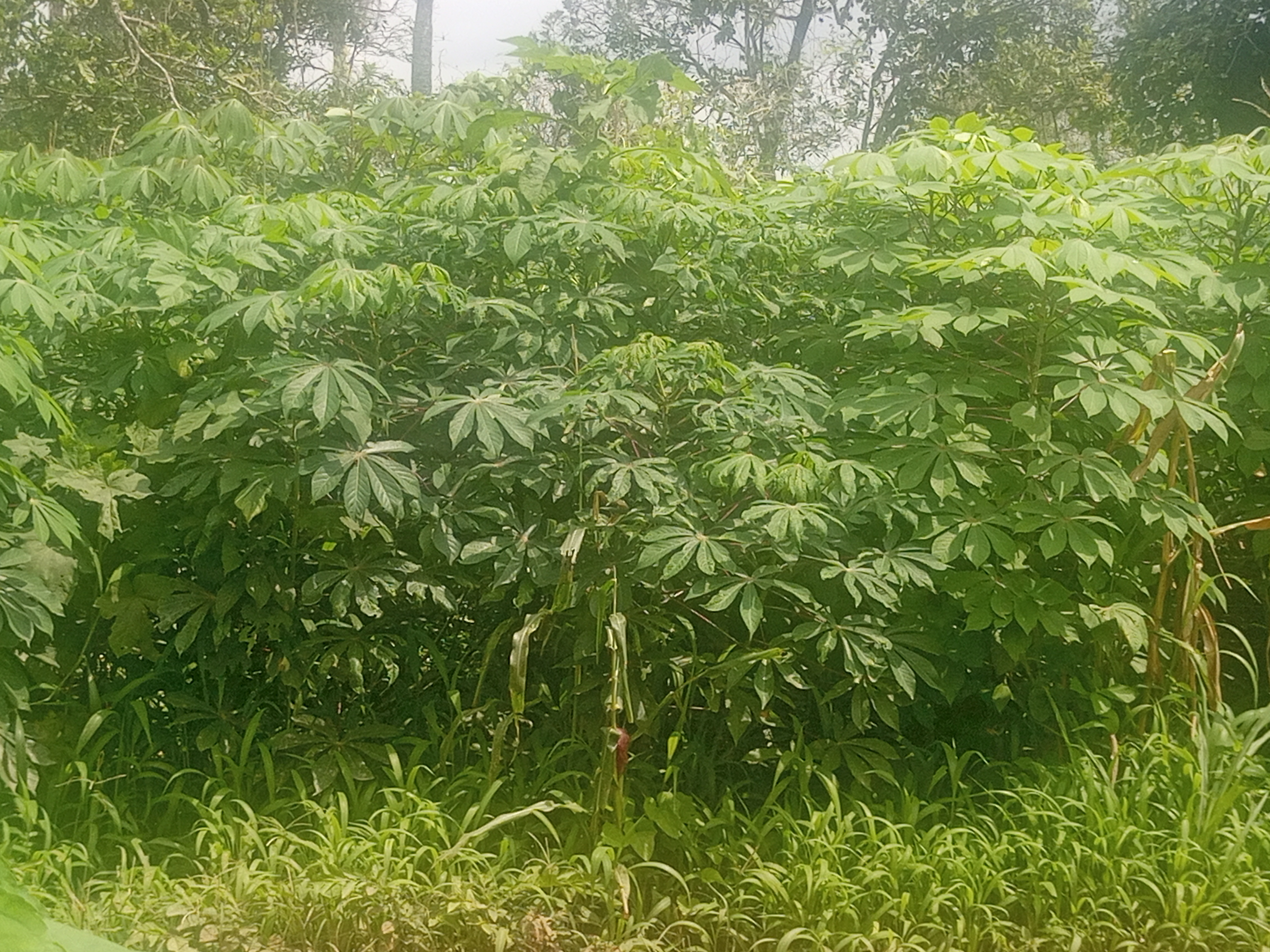
Cassava farm plant

Cassava (Manihot esculenta) production is vital to the economy of Nigeria as the country is the world's largest producer of the commodity. The crop is produced in 24 of the country's 36 states. In 1999, Nigeria produced 33 million tonnes, while a decade later, it produced approximately 45 million tonnes, which is almost 19% of production in the world. The average yield per hectare is 10.6 tonnes.

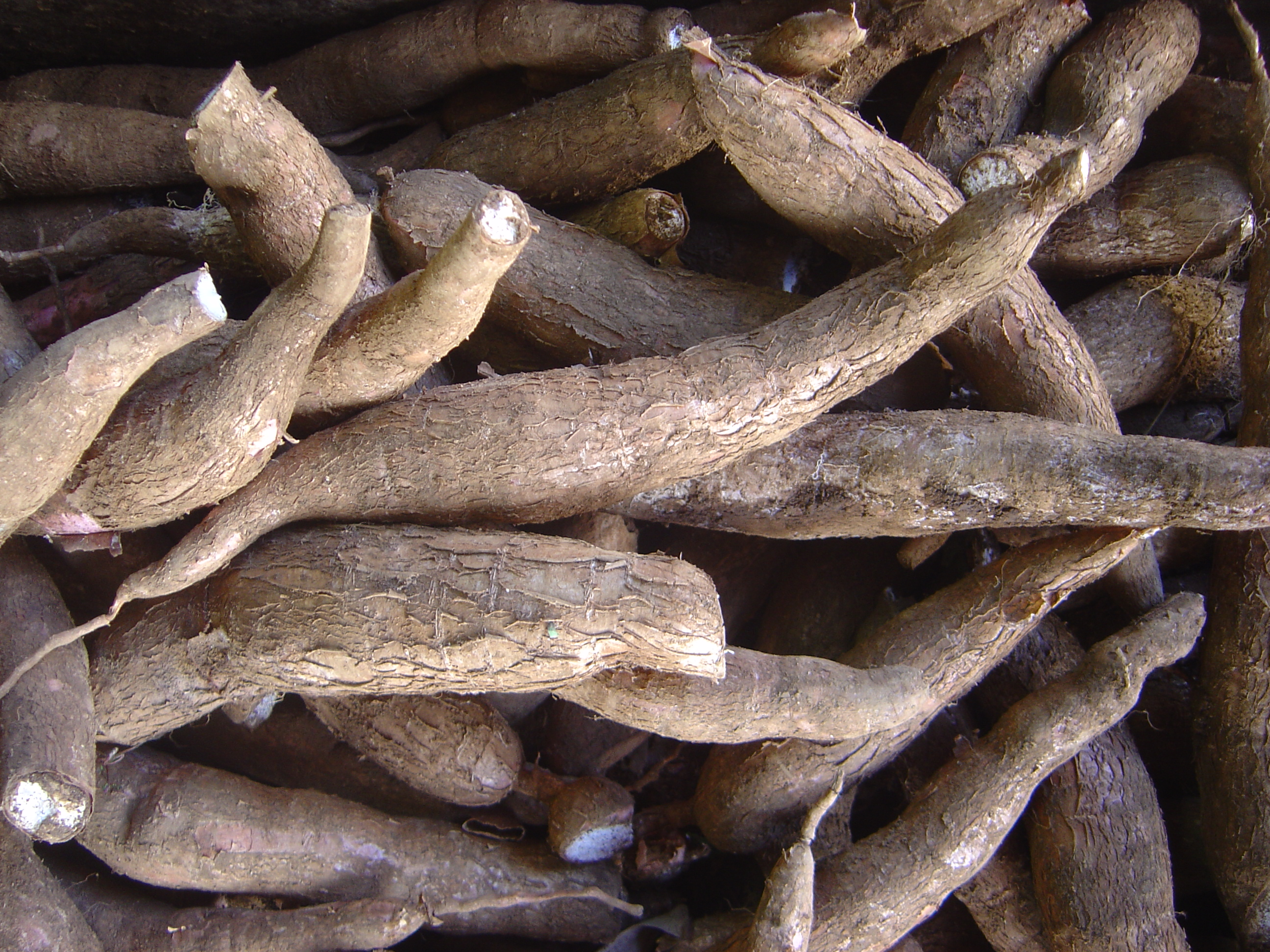
Manihote sculenta/cassava

In Nigeria, cassava production is well-developed as an organized agricultural crop. It has well-established multiplication and processing techniques for food products and cattle feed. There are more than 40 cassava varieties in use. Cassava is processed in many processing centres and fabricating enterprises set up in different parts of the country.

== History ==
Originally a crop of South America, it was introduced into Nigeria's southern part during the period of slave trade proliferated by Portuguese explorers and colonizers in the sixteenth century. However, its importance to the country got a boost in the late nineteenth century when more formerly enslaved Nigerians returned to their homeland and introduced processing techniques. Over the years, it has become a major economic sustenance crop and it has attained the status of largest producer in the world with recorded production of 34 million tonnes and is a cash crop of great importance to the people of Nigeria.

== Production ==
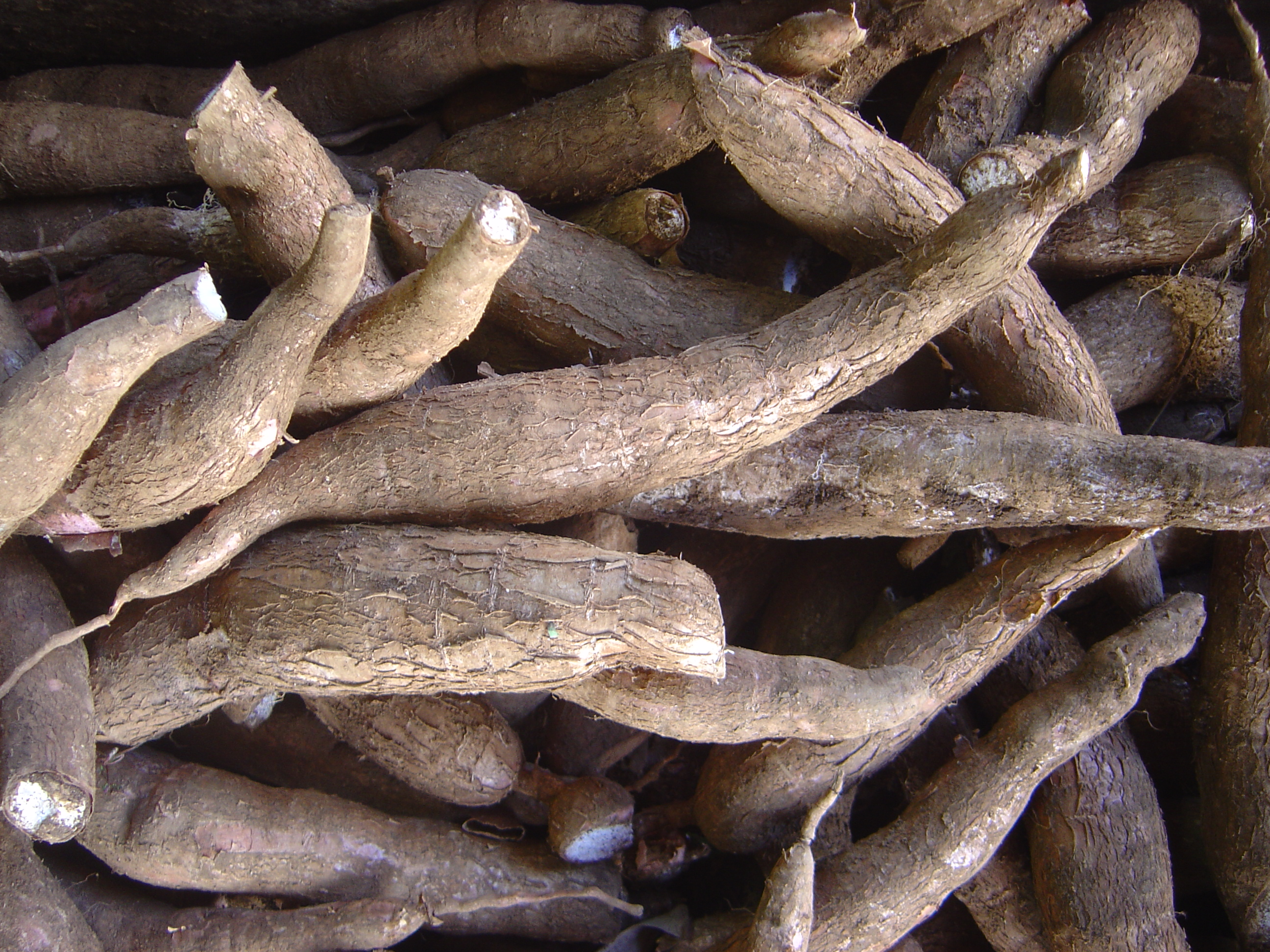
Casava (Manihot esculenta) roots

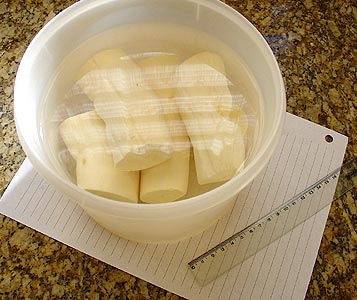
Peeled casava

In Nigeria, cassava production is well-developed as an organized agricultural crop. It has well-established multiplication and processing techniques for food products and cattle feed. There are more than 40 cassava varieties in use. Though the crop is produced in 24 of the country's 36 states, cassava production dominates the southern part of the country, both in terms of area covered and a number of farmers growing the crop. Planting occurs during four planting seasons in the various geo-ecological zones. The major states of Nigeria which produce cassava are Anambra, Delta, Edo, Benue, Cross River, Imo, Oyo, and Rivers, and to a lesser extent Kwara and Ondo.

In 1999, Nigeria produced 33 million tonnes. As of 2000, the average yield per hectare was 10.6 tonnes.

Cassava is grown throughout the year, making it preferable to the seasonal crops of yam, beans, or peas. It displays an exceptional ability to adapt to climate change, with tolerance to low soil fertility, resistance to drought conditions, pests, and diseases, and suitability to store its roots for long periods underground even after they mature. Use of fertilizers is limited, and it is also grown on fallow lands. Harvesting of the roots after planting varies from 6 months to 3 years.

The land holding for farming in Nigeria is between 0.5–2.5 hectares (1.2–6.2 acres), with about 90% of producers being small-scale farms. In order to increase production, several varieties of cassava have been developed which are pest resistant; production in the country is hampered by problems with green mite, the cassava mealybug, and the variegated grasshopper. Diseases affecting cassava crop are mosaic disease, bacterial blight, anthracnose, and root rot.

== Government intervention ==
Eager to promote self-sufficiency, the government promotes the use of cassava while curtailing rice and wheat imports. According to a Nigerian Presidential Initiative of July 2002, the cropped area of cultivation of cassava was proposed to be increased to 5 million hectares by the end of 2010 with a projected annual yield of 150 million tonnes resulting in an annual export earning of US$5 billion. An adopted innovation is the introduction of vitamin A-rich cassava. The federal Government of Nigeria launched a project to introduce pro-Vitamin A cassava varieties to 1.8 million farmers in the country.

The 2002 Presidential Initiative by former president, Olusegun Obasanjo, on composite cassava flour was, however, reversed even before it reached maturity by his successor, President Umaru Musa Yar' Adua.

Special Adviser to the Chairman of the defunct Presidential Committee on Cassava Initiative Programme under the Chief Olusegun Obasanjo’s regime, who also doubles as the Chairman, New Partnership for African Development’s Pan African Cassava Initiative, Mr Boma Angar, argues that the inability to back the Cassava policy with a legislative bill that will survive any government was what killed the Obasanjo initiative.

Boma Angar and Hon. Commissioner Of Agriculture, Ogun State, Engr. Ayo Olubori are of the strong opinion that the new FG Cassava Initiative by President Goodluck Jonathan will suffer the same fate as the old one except backed by a legislative bill.

PwC estimates that Nigeria would need about 28.3 million metric tonnes of fresh cassava root planted annually on about 1.2 million hectares of land to meet the country’s demand for cassava by-[products and derivatives.

== Uses ==
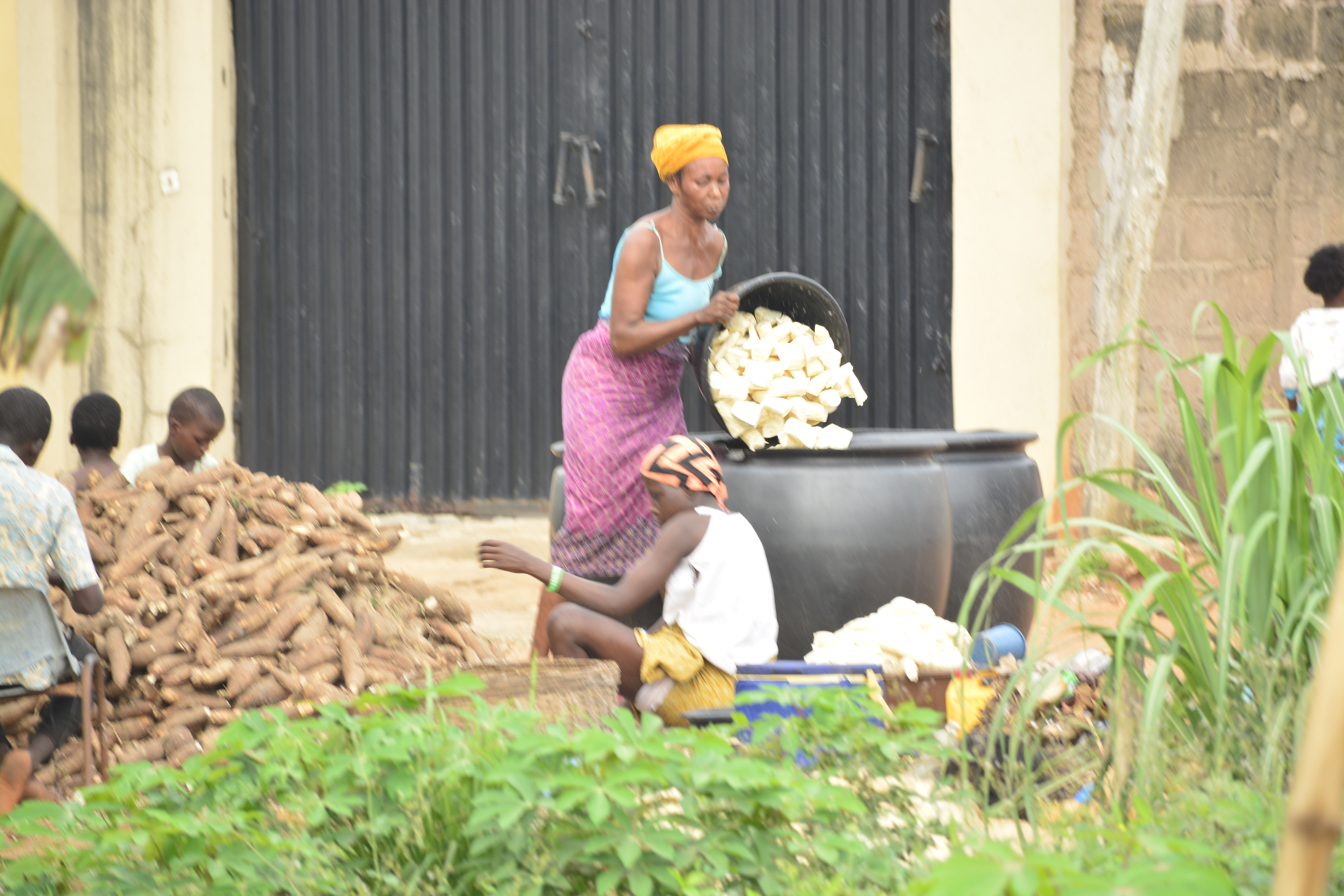
Cassava processing

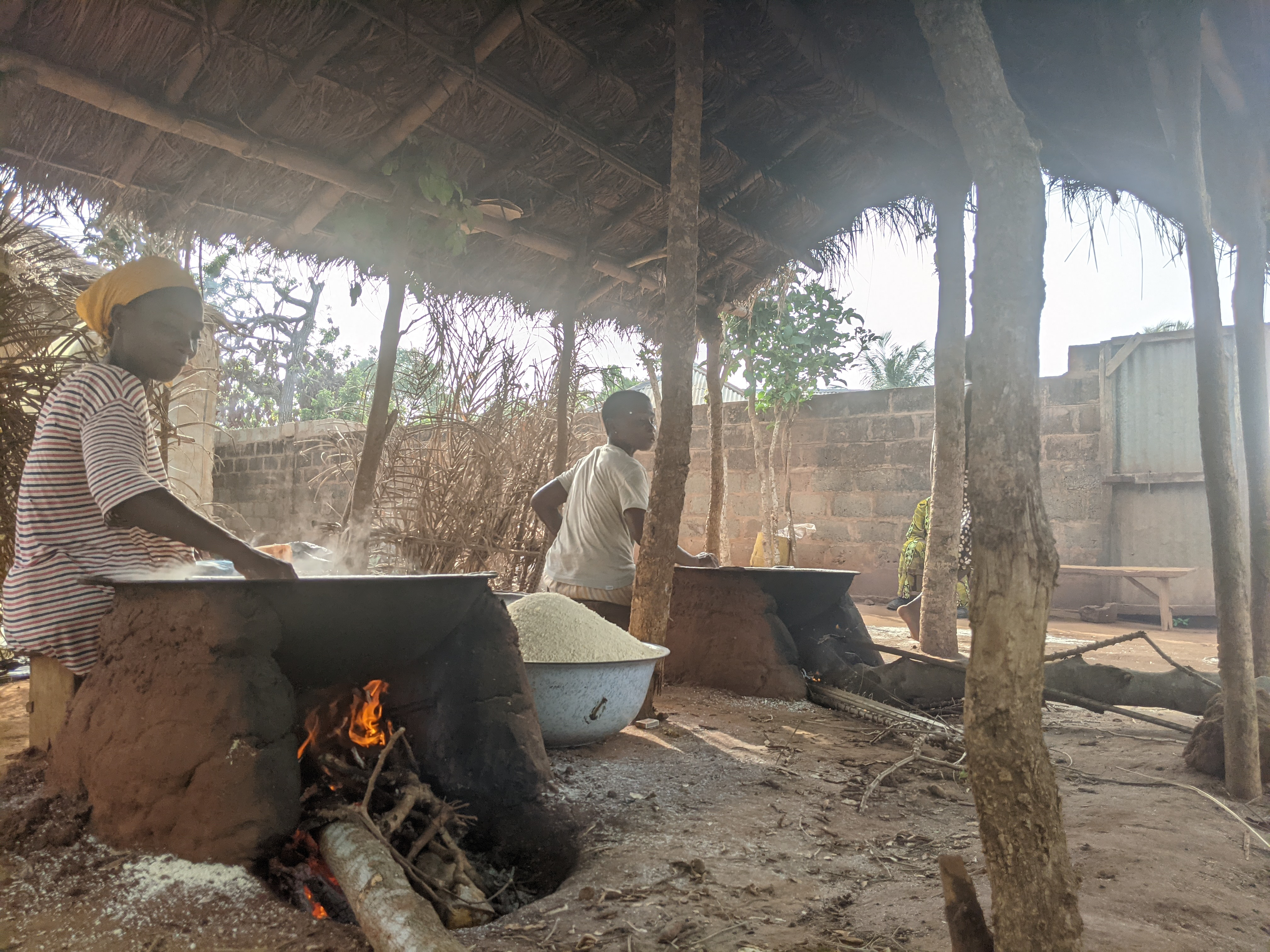
Garri processing

Cassava, which is rich in starch in the form of carbohydrate, has multiple uses. It is consumed in many processed forms, in the industry and also as livestock feed. Roots or leaves are made into flours. Flours are of three types, yellow garri, white garri, or intermediate colour, with yellow garri considered the best product in Nigeria. Its other products are as dry extraction of starch, glue or adhesives, modified starch in pharmaceutical as dextrins, as processing inputs, as industrial starch for drilling, and processed foods.

== Cassava Processing Products ==
1. Garri: Garri is a widely consumed food in Nigeria, made from cassava tubers. The production process involves several steps: cleaning and washing the cassava, peeling, grating, fermenting, dewatering, frying, and finally, sieving to achieve the desired texture. Traditionally, garri is white, but it can also be produced in a yellow variety by adding palm oil during the frying stage. This versatile food is commonly eaten in various forms, such as a cereal with water and sugar, or as a dough-like meal known as 'eba' when mixed with hot water, making it a central part of the Nigeria diet.
2. Cassava Flour: Cassava flour is a gluten-free ingredient. It is widely used in the production of various food items such as noodles, biscuits, and bread. The production process involves several critical steps, including cleaning, washing, peeling, cutting, crushing, dewatering, drying, and sieving, which collectively ensure the flour's high quality and consistency. This method not only enhances efficiency but also maintains the nutritional value and natural flavor of the cassava flour, making it an ideal choice for gluten-free diets.
3. Cassava fufu flour: Cassava fufu flour is closely related to cassava flour, with the primary distinction being that fufu flour undergoes a fermentation process. In Nigeria, the production of cassava fufu flour typically involves several steps, starting with the cleaning and washing of cassava, followed by peeling and cutting. The fermentation process, which can vary in time and temperature depending on local practices, is a crucial step that imparts the distinct flavor and texture associated with fufu flour. After fermentation, the cassava is crushed, dewatered, dried, and sieved to achieve the final product. This traditional method, deeply rooted in Nigerian culinary culture, results in a flour that is frequently consumed in many households in Nigeria.
4. Cassava starch: Cassava starch is a fine powder derived from cassava roots through a process of extraction, dewatering, and drying. It has a broad range of applications in both food and non-food industries, including paper manufacturing, printing, textiles, cosmetics, and ethanol production. The production of cassava starch involves several key stages, starting with the cleaning and washing of cassava, followed by cutting, crushing, and the removal of fibers and sand. The starch is then refined, dewatered, dried, and sieved to achieve the final product. Each step is critical in ensuring the purity and quality of the starch, making it suitable for diverse industrial uses.
5. Cassava chips: Cassava chips are produced by cleaning, peeling, and slicing harvested cassava roots, they offer uses such as animal feed. Once dried, these chips can be stored for extended periods, making them a practical and sustainable option for various applications. The process of drying not only preserves the cassava but also enhances its value, providing a reliable resource for industries that rely on this crop for feedstock or biofuel production. Additionally, the ability to store dried cassava chips for longer periods ensures a steady supply, even during off-harvest seasons, contributing to food security and economic stability.

== See also ==
- Yam production in Nigeria
