= Ikokore =

Yoruba water yam-based dish

Ikokore or Ifokore is a water yam pottage or porridge dish among the Yoruba people, popular among the Ijebu. It is made from Dioscorea alata, called Isu Ewura in Yoruba, grated and cooked with ingredients like peppers, onions, condiments like Ogiri, and spices. A lot of proteins are usually incorporated into Ikokore. Ikokore can be eaten on its own or served with cold eba (eba tutu).

== Ingredients ==
- Water yam
- Fish
- Pepper
- Ponmo
- Salt
- Onions
- Ogiri
- Crayfish
- Palm oil
