= Ji akwụkwọ nri =

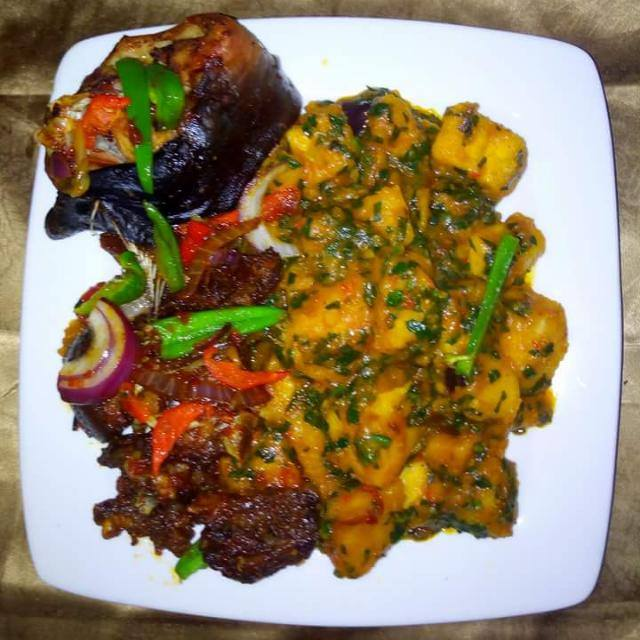
- A plate of ji akwụkwọ nri
- Alternative names: Vegetable yam
- Place of origin: Southeast Nigeria (Igboland)
- Serving temperature: Warm
- Main ingredients: Boiled yam; Palm oil; Leafy vegetables
- Ingredients generally used: Ugba (Pentaclethra macrophylla)

Ji akwụkwọ nri is a dish of Igbo origin. Its name combines the words ji (lit. 'yam') and akwụkwọ nri (lit. 'edible vegetable'); the dish is sometimes known as agwọrọgwọ ji or by the literal translation "vegetable yam".

== Recipe ==
The dish combines yam tubers with edible vegetables such as spinach or ugu. Other ingredients include fresh red pepper, onions, crayfish, oil bean (ugba), seasoning cubes, and salt to enhance the flavor.

Ji akwụkwọ nri is prepared by peeling and washing the yam. The other ingredients are added and cooked together until the yam becomes soft, depending on the preferred cooking time. It is considered to be an Igbo delicacy, especially eaten during the annual New Yam Festival (Igbo: Iri Ji Ọhụrụ).

== See also ==
- Asaro, a West African yam porridge
