= Ofe Oha =

Traditional Nigerian soup

Ofe Ọha
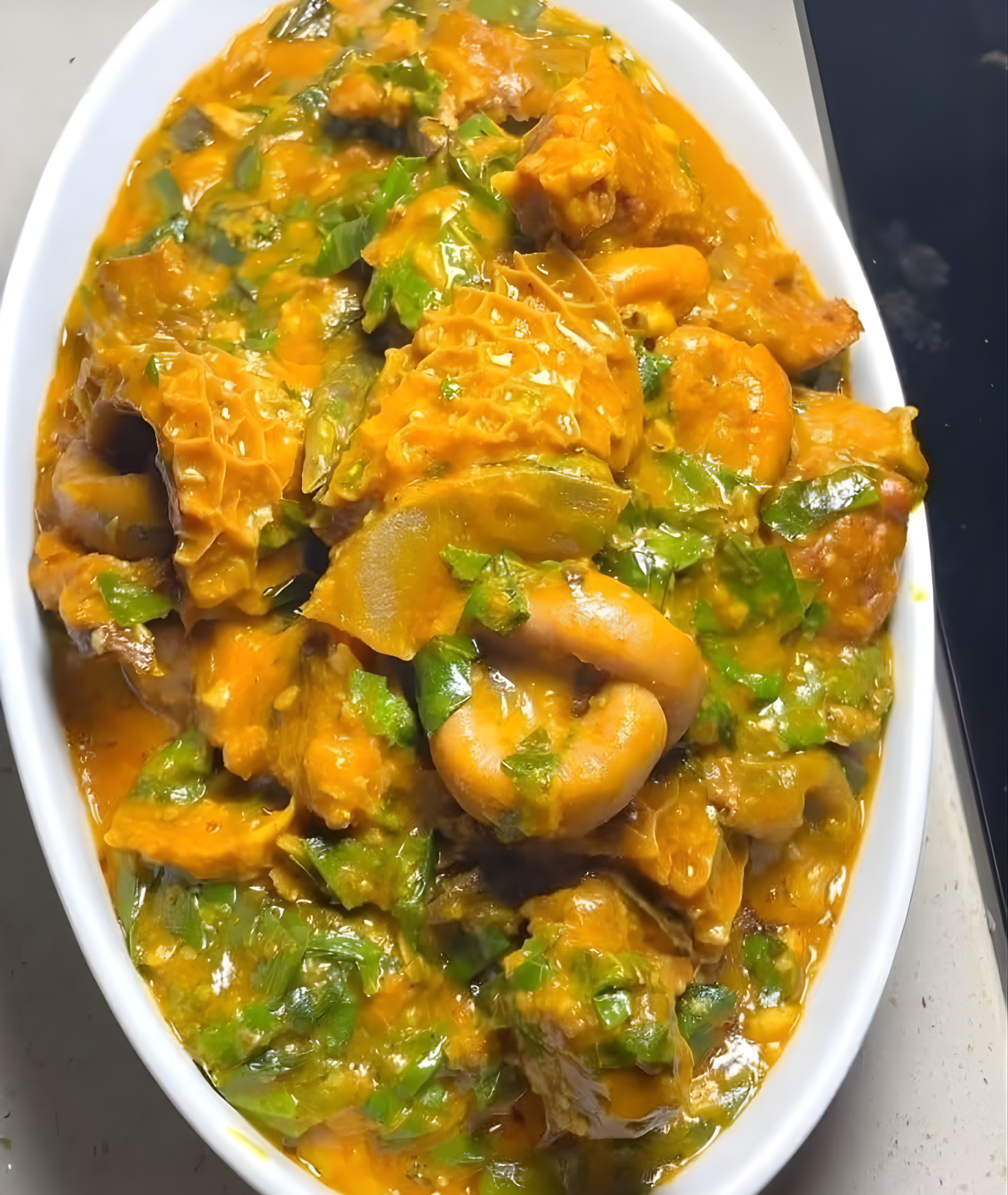
- Ofe Oha
- Type: Soup
- Place of origin: Igbo, southeastern Nigeria
- Region or state: South East
- Serving temperature: hot or cold
- Main ingredients: Oha leaves, meat or fish, palm oil, seasonings
- Ingredients generally used: Uziza

Ofe Ọha// (also known as Ọha soup), is a traditional Igbo soup from south eastern part of Nigeria, known for its rich flavour and the use of fresh ọha leaves.

Ofe Ọha is a Nigerian delicacy from the eastern region (Igbo land). It is commonly prepared from an evergreen tree leaves whose botanical name is Pterocarpus mildraedii.

The main ingredient for the soup is the ọha leaf, others include uziza, achi (soup thickener), meat, crayfish, palm oil and salt. Other names for the soup include uha, aja, and ora soup.

Oha leaf is not to be confused or conflated with Uturukpa leaf (Pterocarpus santalinoides) which looks almost similar but are different leaves. Uturukpa is used for a different type of soup. It is usually milder, a little bitter, has medicinal values and used for Ofe Uturukpa.

== Other foods ==
Ofe Ọha is mainly eaten with akpu or garri amongst the Igbo people. With the Efiks, Anaangs and Ibibios, it is best eaten with Pounded yam. Semolina, Wheat, Utara (garri), Utara ji (pounded yam) and akpu also goes well with the soup.

== Health benefits ==
Ofe Ọha has several health benefits, including supporting the immune system, aiding digestion, helping manage diarrhea, contributing to cancer prevention, and promoting bone and heart health. Oha leaves contain important minerals such as magnesium, calcium, potassium, copper, iron, zinc, and manganese, which contribute to these benefits. They are also rich in vitamins A, B, and C, as well as amino acids like lysine, glutamic acid, and cysteine, while maintaining a low sodium content.

Beyond being used in soup, Oha leaves can also be prepared as an herbal drink by soaking them in hot water, added to salads, or combined with other soups to enhance flavor and nutritional value.

== Gallery ==
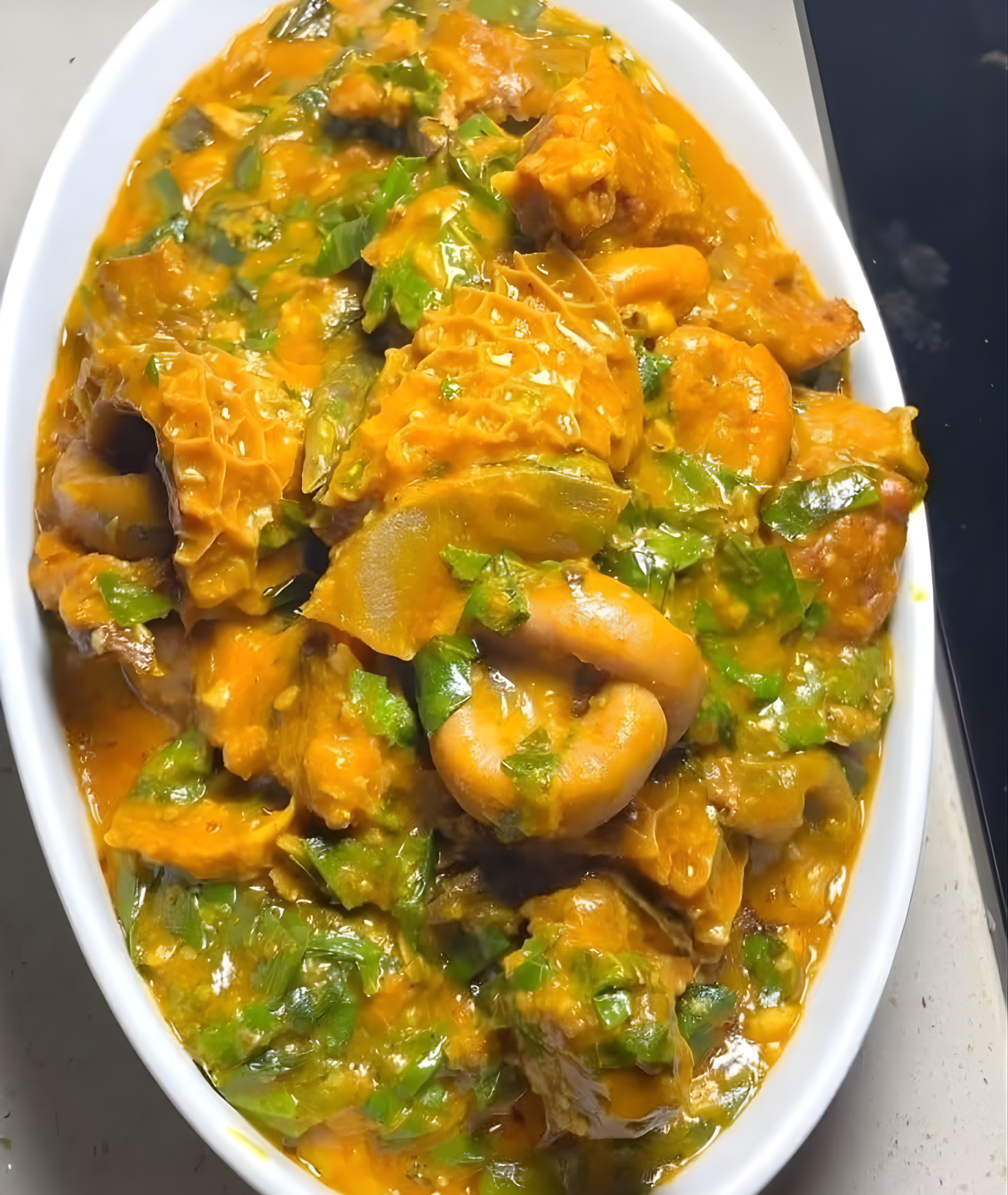
Freshly cooked Ofe Oha with meats.
