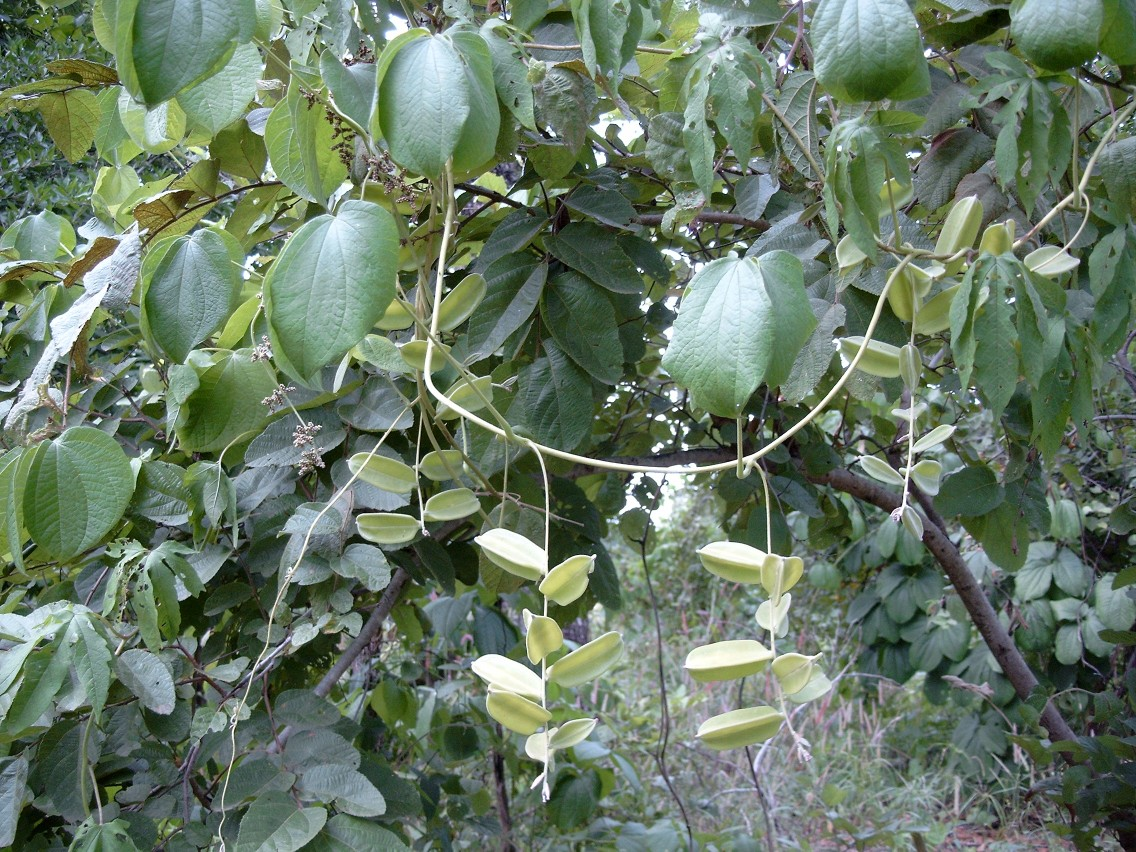

Scientific classification
- Kingdom: Plantae
- Clade: Tracheophytes
- Clade: Angiosperms
- Clade: Monocots
- Order: Dioscoreales
- Family: Dioscoreaceae
- Genus: Dioscorea
- Species: D. dumetorum

Binomial name
- Dioscorea dumetorum (Kunth) Pax

= Dioscorea dumetorum =

Species of yam from Africa

Dioscorea dumetorum, also known as the bitter yam, cluster yam, trifoliate yam, or three-leaved yam, is a species of flowering plant in the yam family, Dioscorea. It is native to sub-Saharan Africa and especially common in the tropical regions of West Africa, including Nigeria, Benin, and Ghana. D. dumetorum has both toxic and non-toxic varieties.

== Description ==
Dioscorea dumetorum has distinctive trifoliate leaves, similar to the Indian three-leaf yam Dioscorea hispida. Each leaf has 3 to 7 veins per leaflet.

The vine has ridged ascending prickles and a characteristic twining to the left. D. dumetorum grows up onto shrubs and reaches heights of about 7 meters. The vines grow annually from the underground tubers.

The tubers of D. dumetorum are deeply lobed and occur in clusters just below the surface of the soil.

The flower of the bitter yam is brown. Male flowers are arranged in complex branched structures while female flowers are arranged in spikes. The seeds are winged capsules that are oblong in shape.

Its wild form is highly toxic due to the high content of the alkaloids dihydrodioscorine and dioscorine. However, there are non-toxic edible cultivars in West Africa. For example, within Benin there are 15 identified non-toxic local varieties of D. dumetorum.

== Habitat ==
Dioscorea dumetorum grows in disturbed areas such as riverbanks, forest margins, termite mounds, and rocky areas.

Its range is throughout sub-saharan Africa. D. dumetorum is mainly cultivated in the Bight of Biafra region from southeast Nigeria to Gabon, as well in the Ubangi-Shari region of inland Central Africa.

== Uses ==
Dioscorea dumetorum is a famine food in West Africa. It is frequently planted as a backup harvest in cases of crop failure. However, the regular use of D. dumetorum is limited due to its frequent toxicity and tendency to harden after harvesting.

Because of the toxicity of most trifoliate yam races, specific processing before consumption is required. Methods for detoxification include: placing in running water for 3-5 days or burying in black soil. Salt, Tamarind pods, or desert dates are sometimes added to these methods as detoxicants. In Mozambique, the tubers are first cut into thin slices, dried on rocks, and then undergo a detoxification process.

Nontoxic varieties of D. dumetorum are common in West Africa. In countries such as Benin and Nigeria these varieties are farmed in subsistence agriculture. In West Africa, the non-toxic varieties of D. dumetorum are considered an underutilized food source as the tuber is high in starch and nutrients. Nonetheless, the bitter yam species remains economically and culturally significant in the region.

Additionally, the yam is observed to harden after harvest, a characteristic which decreases its appeal for consumers. Microscopy of yams post harvest has demonstrated that the hardening of the tuber is due to the thickening of cell walls. The rate of hardening is dependent on how D. dumetorum is stored. To avoid post harvest hardening trifoliate yam is frequently ground into flour after harvesting.

Bitter yam can be consumed whole, boiled, or fried. Flour made from the tuber is used to make unleavened bread or to make porridge. The seeds can also be eaten but must undergo a detoxification process and are then dried.

== Vernacular names ==
Local names for D. dumetorum in West African languages:

- Volta–Niger languages
  - Owere language (Igboid): ɔ̀nà
  - Yoruba language: èsúrú
  - Ìjẹ̀bú language: èsè
- Benue–Congo languages
  - Ibibio language: ánêm
  - Tiv language: ínímbe
  - Duala language: mbá
  - Boyela language (Bantu): moma

== See also ==
- Yam production in Nigeria
