= Cocoyam =

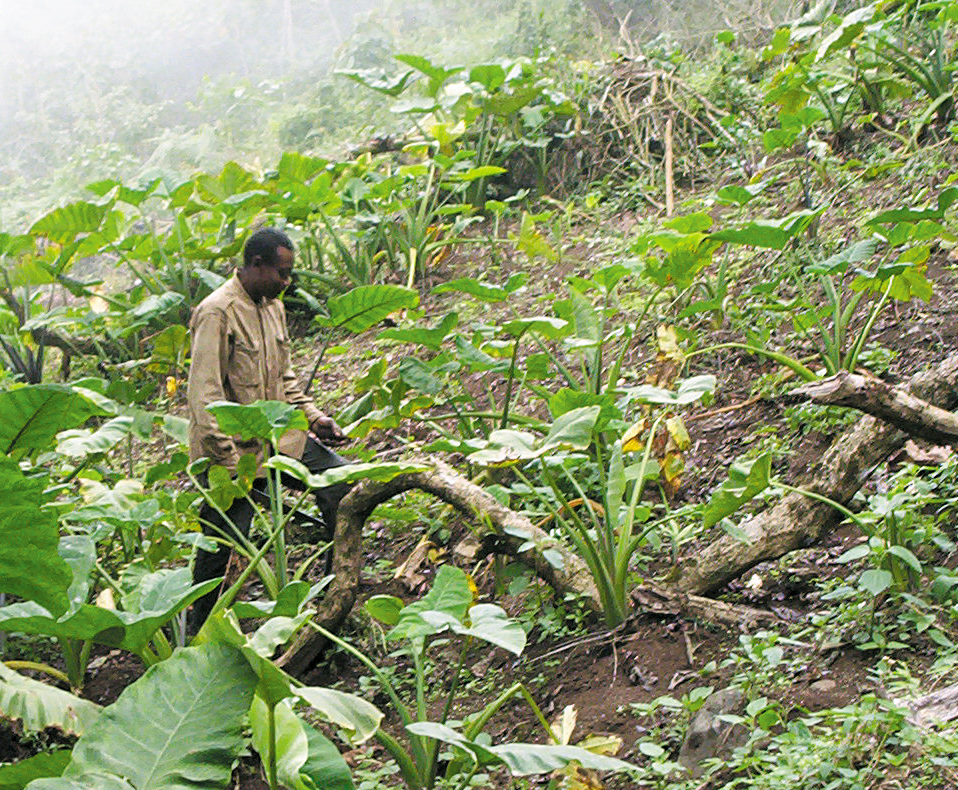
A man in Cameroon tends to his cocoyam farm on the slope of Mount Fako

Cocoyam is a common name for more than one tropical root crop and vegetable crop belonging to the Arum family (also known as Aroids and by the family name Araceae) and may refer to:

- Taro (Colocasia esculenta) – old cocoyam
- Malanga (Xanthosoma spp.) – new cocoyam

Cocoyams are herbaceous perennial plants belonging to the family Araceae and are grown primarily for their edible roots, although all parts of the plant are edible. Cocoyams that are cultivated as food crops belong to either the genus Colocasia or the genus Xanthosoma and are generally composed of a large spherical corm (swollen underground storage stem), from which a few large leaves emerge.

The petioles of the leaves (leaf stems) stand erect and can reach lengths in excess of one metre (three feet). The leaf blades are large and heart-shaped and can reach 50 centimetres (20 inches) in length. The corm produces lateral buds that give rise to side-corms (cormels, suckers) or stolons (long runners, creeping rhizomes) depending on the species and variety. Cocoyams commonly reach in excess of one metre (three feet) in height and although they are perennials, they are often grown as annuals, harvested after one season. Colocasia species may also be referred to as taro, old cocoyam, arrowroot, eddoe, macabo, kontomire or dasheen and originate from the region of Southeast Asia. Xanthosoma species may be referred to as tannia, yautia, new cocoyam or Chinese taro and originate from Central and South America.
