= Karel Heyne =

Dutch botanist

- Born: 30 August 1877; Amsterdam
- Died: 11 November 1947 (aged 70); Bennekom
- Known for: Botanical handbook De nuttige planten van Nederlansch-Indië (1913–1917)
- Awards: Officer in the Order of Oranje Nassau
- Scientific career
- Fields: Botany
- Author abbrev. (botany): K.Heyne

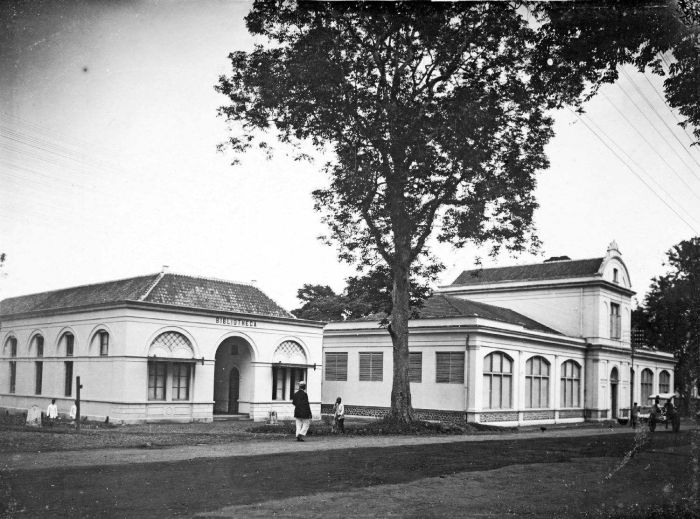
The library of the Museum voor Economische Botanie in Buitenzorg, circa 1920–1930.

Karel Heyne (1877–1947) was a Dutch botanist, known for his comprehensive handbook on the useful plants of the Dutch East Indies (The useful plants of the Dutch East Indies); this was the first such handbook and became a standard reference.

Towards the end of the 19th century, he settled on Java in the former Dutch East Indies. In 1900, at the age of 23, he started working for the Koninklijke Paketvaart Maatschappij (KPM). He married Wilhelmina Louise Visser (1871–1913) in 1903, and they had two sons, the first in 1905 and the second in 1906. In January 1906, Heyne was appointed chief curator of the Museum voor Economische Botanie (Museum of Economic Botany) in Buitenzorg by Melchior Treub, the then director of 's Lands Plantentuin in Buitenzorg. In January 1920 he married Ida van Oorschot (1875–1957). In 1926, Heyne resigned as curator and in April 1927 he repatriated to the Netherlands. He and his wife went to live in Bennekom, where he bought a large house.

He added two greenhouses, one heated and one kept temperate. There he cultivated Indonesian plants till his death twenty years later. Heating the greenhouse made him rise at four, every night, to refill the coal-burning stove.

— De Wit 1994

== Selected publications ==
- Heyne, K. 1907–1926. Jaarboek Departement van Landbouw, Handel en Nijverheid.
- Heyne, K. (1907). "Nota over het klapper-vraagstuk". Teysmannia. 18. G. Kolff & Co.: 52–64, 120–130.
- Heyne, K. (1909). "Kedele op de Europeesche markt". Teysmannia. 20. Batavia: G. Kolff & Co.: 687–691. OCLC 238645274.
- Heyne, K. (1911). "Garoehout". Teysmannia. 22. Batavia: G. Kolff & Co.: 411–417.
- Heyne, Karel. De nuttige planten van Nederlansch-Indië, tevens synthetische catalogus der verzamelingen van het Museum voor Technische- en Handelsbotanie te Buitenzorg (4 delen). Batavia: Ruygrok & Co; 1913-1917
- Heyne, K. "Een massieve bamboe". Algemeen Landbouwkundig Weekblad Nederlandsch-Indië: 551–552; 1919/1920
- Heyne, K. "Copal". Algemeen Landbouwkundig Weekblad Nederlandsch-Indië: 1137–1138; 1919/1920

== Eponyms ==
- (Zingiberaceae) Curcuma heyneana Valeton & Zijp
- (Zingiberaceae) Phaeomeria heyneana (Valeton) Burkill
- (Apocynaceae) Heynella lactea Backer
