= Birchall (disambiguation) =

Birchall is a surname.

Birchall may also refer to:

- Birchall, Staffordshire, a location in England
- Birchall Peaks, group of mountain peaks in Antarctica
- Kelly & Birchall, English architectural practice
- Birchalls, Tasmanian bookstore, education supply and stationery company
