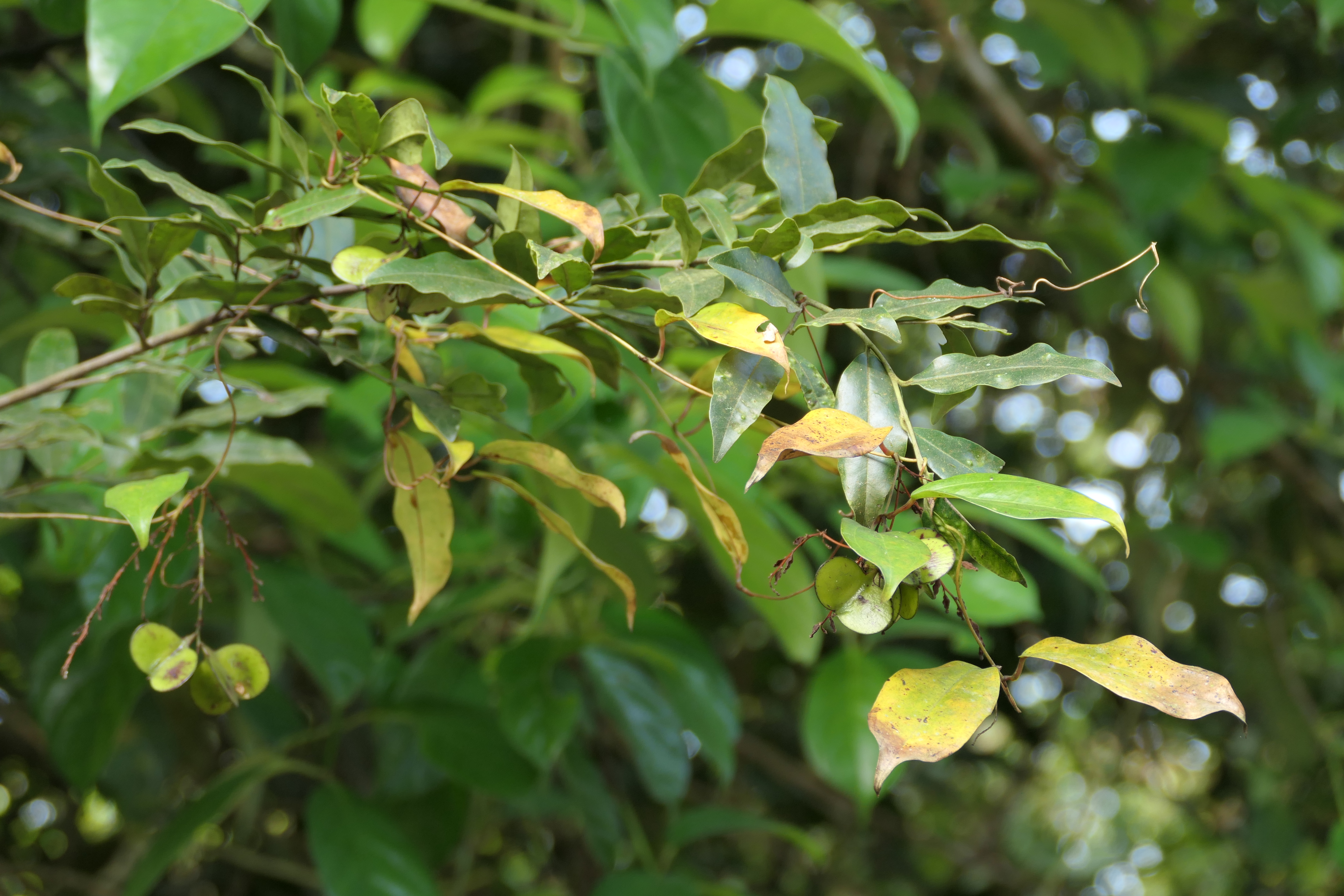

Scientific classification
- Kingdom: Plantae
- Clade: Tracheophytes
- Clade: Angiosperms
- Clade: Monocots
- Order: Dioscoreales
- Family: Dioscoreaceae
- Genus: Dioscorea
- Species: D. oppositifolia

Binomial name
- Dioscorea oppositifolia L.

Synonyms
- Dioscorea opposita Thunb.; Dioscorea oppositifolia var. dukhunensis Prain & Burkill; Dioscorea oppositifolia var. linnaei Prain & Burkill; Dioscorea oppositifolia var. thwaitesii Prain & Burkill

= Dioscorea oppositifolia =

Species of herbaceous vine

Dioscorea oppositifolia is a type of yam (Dioscorea) native to Myanmar (Burma) and to the Indian subcontinent (India, Sri Lanka, Bangladesh).

== Taxonomy ==
The plant previously called D. opposita is now considered to be the same species as D. oppositifolia. However Dioscorea polystachya is often incorrectly called Dioscorea opposita. Botanical works that point out that error may list, e.g., Dioscorea opposita auct. non Thunb. as a synonym of D. polystachya.

== See also ==
- Dioscorea villosa
- Yam (vegetable)
