= Violin Sonata No. 25 (Mozart) =

1781 composition by W. A. Mozart

- by W. A. Mozart
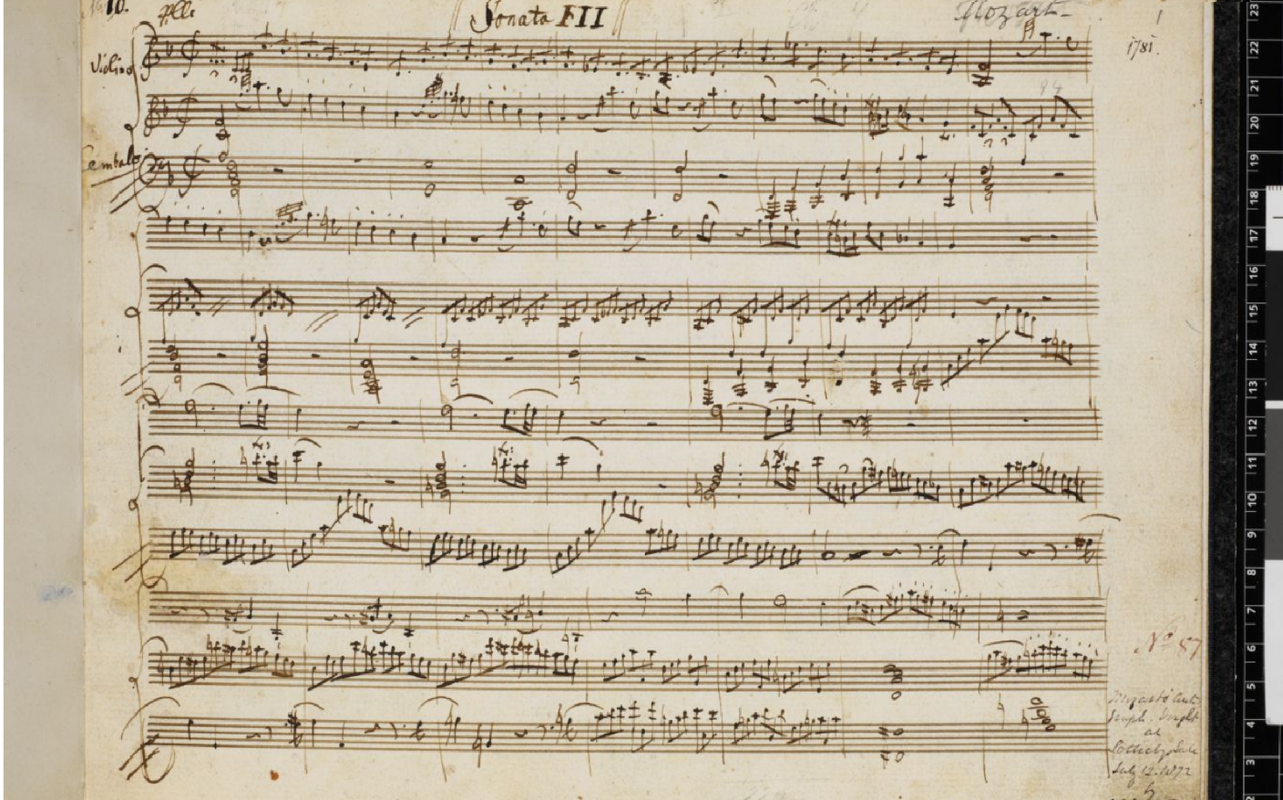
- First page from the 1781 autograph score
- Key: F major
- Catalogue: K. 377
- Composed: Vienna, 1781
- Dedication: Josepha Barbara Auernhammer
- Published: Vienna, November 1781
- Publisher: Artaria
- Duration: c. 19 minutes
- Movements: 3
- Scoring: Violin and piano

The Violin Sonata No. 25 in F major, K. 377, by Wolfgang Amadeus Mozart is a 1781 sonata in three movements.

== History ==
The work was the third of six violin sonatas published in Vienna by Artaria and Co. in November 1781. This piece was dedicated to the pianist Josepha Barbara Auernhammer.

The work, along with its companion sonatas, received a warm review in 1783 from an anonymous author in the pages of Magazin der Musik:

These sonatas are the only ones of their kind ... They are rich in new ideas, showing traces of the great musical genius of their author. ... Moreover, the violin accompaniment is so ingeniously combined with the piano part that both instruments are continuously employed; and thus these sonatas demand a violinist as accomplished as the pianist.”

The reviewer's remarks reflect the status of the violin sonata in Mozart's time; it was construed primarily as a piano sonata, with the violin part serving as accompaniment; Mozart's work reflects the beginning of the move toward coequal status in this genre.

The popularity of the work is also attested by the fact that five other publishers, in three other cities, issued their own editions:

- Boyer, Paris, ca. 1785
- Hummel, Amsterdam, ca. 1786
- London, Longman and Broderip, ca. 1790
- London, Birchall, ca. 1790
- London, John Bland, ca. 1790

== Movements ==
=== I. Allegro ===
It has been said that this movement "overflows with energy". This movement contains multiple triplets and unexpected parts. Of the bass line, Lacroix writes, "The harmonic nature of the bass voice did not preclude Mozart, as Bach did repeatedly, from allowing it to contain moments of melodic interest at which point the typical 2+1 linear texture then becomes a three-voice counterpoint."

=== II. Andante ===
This movement contains a theme and six variations in D minor, foreshadowing the finale of his upcoming String Quartet in D minor, K. 421. The sixth variation is a siciliana in 6/8 time.

=== III. Tempo di menuetto ===
Two sections of the menuet are repeated – with slight variations – and the violin is only present on the repeats. The trio section is in B♭ major, and the movement ends with repeat of the menuet and a coda.
