= Burkill Hall =

Plantation-style house in Singapore

Coordinates: 1°18′44″N 103°48′49″E

Burkill Hall is a historic bungalow in the Singapore Botanic Gardens. It is the last Anglo-Malayan plantation-style house in the region and possibly in the world.

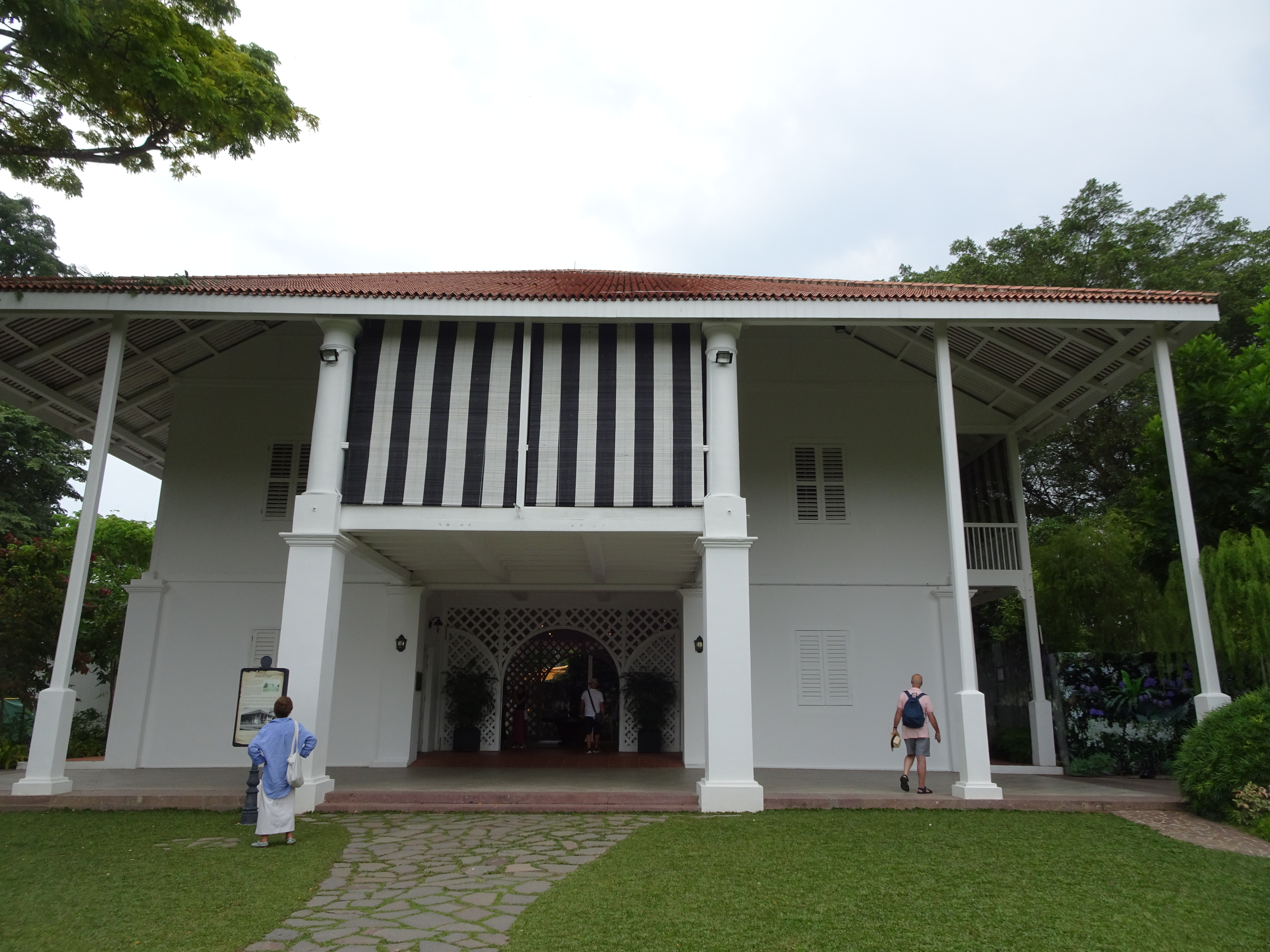
Burkill Hall in 2018, after repainting to the original all-white colour scheme.

== History ==
Constructed in 1868 to house the directors of the gardens, the building features broad verandahs and high ceilings to allow for more natural light and ventilation, and was originally known as the Director's House on the grounds of the Gardens, later renamed to Burkill Hall after Isaac Burkill and Humphrey Burkill. The building was the residence of gardens superintendent Henry James Murton. The bungalow served as the residence of the first scientific director of the gardens, Sir Henry Nicholas Ridley.

In 1960, the building was painted both black and white by the Public Works Department, despite the original building being completely painted in white. In 2013, gardens director Nigel Paul Taylor realised the error while doing research on the history of the bungalow, with all pictures of the building before 1959 showing the building being completely painted in white, and the building itself predating black and white bungalows. The building was subsequently repainted. The building is the last Anglo-Malayan plantation-style house in the region and possibly in the world.

The bungalow was conserved in 2008, and the nearby Bandstand received protected status the following year. On 4 July 2015, the Singapore Botanic Gardens, which contain the house, were inscribed on the UNESCO World Heritage List. In November 2015, the National Parks Board announced that Burkill Hall would be repainted to restore its original white appearance, after photographs from the late 1800s to 1959 showed the building clad in white. Its black window and door frames, timber beams and railings were to be repainted the following January. The paints company AkzoNobel funded the refresh of Burkill Hall and the Bandstand through the Garden City Fund, the National Parks Board's registered charity, and its staff helped apply the coat. Gardens director Nigel Taylor described the Gardens' heritage as a collection of shared memories spanning generations of Singaporeans.
