= Heynella =

Scientific classification
- Kingdom: Plantae
- Clade: Tracheophytes
- Clade: Angiosperms
- Clade: Eudicots
- Clade: Asterids
- Order: Gentianales
- Family: Apocynaceae
- Subfamily: Asclepiadoideae
- Tribe: Marsdenieae
- Genus: Heynella; Backer
- Species: H. lactea

Binomial name
- Heynella lactea Backer

Genus of plants

Heynella is a monotypic genus of flowering plants belonging to the family Apocynaceae. The only species is Heynella lactea.

It is native to Java.

The genus name of Heynella is in honour of Karel Heyne (1877–1947), a Dutch botanist. It was first described and published in Blumea Vol.6 on page 381 in 1950.
