= Ramuan =

Blend of ingredients selected to provide health benefits

Ramuan is an Indonesian-Malay term referring to a blend of ingredients (e.g., plants or plant organs) selected to provide health benefits in the preparation of food or the creation of herbal medicines. Ramuan may consist of leaves, stems, barks, fruits and roots, traditionally gathered from the rainforest.

== History ==
In traditional Malay, ber-ramu means to collect or look for leaves, fruits and roots for medicinal ingredients. Another commonly used term is rempah ratus (a term denoting a polyherbal preparation that requires hundreds of medicinal plants and spices).

In a broader context, the term ramuan is almost interchangeable with the idea of "mixture". However, it further encompasses the sense of ingredient harmonization; it implies a 'melting pot', of unity and integration as well as the sense of 'many held together within unity'.

Today, the concept of ramuan is considered most significant in its application to holistic herbal health and beauty preparations. Indigenous people of Indonesia experimented with this wealth of herbal resources, creating and testing the effects of various blends of botanical components. Over thousands of years of experimentation, certain ramuans became favored for their healing, restorative, or beauty promoting effects. These were incorporated into everyday life through practice or ritual, often taking on strong cultural meanings within native traditions. Examples include preparations to aid with pregnancy, childbirth and recovery from childbirth, along with men's preparations designed to improve virility and vitality. Further examples expand into nearly all aspects of daily life, including Malaysia's spa culture, with preparations designed to tone the skin and enhance overall beauty.

The geographic location of the Dutch East Indies has also influenced its holistic herbal practices. The unique placements of its lands, with broad coastlines, has invited many explorers and settlers from surrounding areas. Consequently, the various cultures and people who traded, settled and inter-married in the region have contributed to the traditions of Malay world countries. Settlers from India and China in particular brought their own traditions, developed by Indian ayurvedics and Chinese herbalists. Those traditions, native wisdom and various holistic health & beauty practices were blended into a new culture. The extensive rainforest resources offered plenty of herbal materials to expand ramuan even further through experimentation. Thus, the cross-pollination of herbal cultures contributed to the richness of ramuan.

== Health and beauty ==
The notion that outer beauty is a reflection of inner health has been passed through many Malay generations, women especially. The belief that inner and outer health form a unity is prominent in the Malay culture.

=== Malay women ===
As the approach to adulthood becomes apparent in a young Malay girl's life, she receives a wealth of herbal health knowledge, from facial and skin care to herbal remedies. Malays believe the face is a reflection of the whole body. A radiant facial complexion is believed to be an indication of a well-balanced mind, body and spirit. Dark circles under the eyes, puffiness, blemishes, dryness and wrinkles reflect an imbalance within the wider body system. Malays believe that internal uncleanliness has direct outer consequences; therefore, a weekly herbal brew of leaves and herbs such as senna leaves (Cassia angustifolia), betel leaves (Piper betle), ginger (Zingiber officinale), sepang (Caesalpinia sappan) and other ingredients is often used for internal cleansing in order to detoxify the body, remove fat and purify the blood, with the goal of promoting a beautiful, youthful complexion.

Malay women also use the readily available Kacip Fatimah (Labisia pumila) and Akar Serapat (Parameria polyneura). For centuries, these herbs have been used to strengthen the uterus and vaginal muscles. Moreover, they are helpful before and after pregnancy. Kacip Fatimah has a variety of other health benefits, from alleviating fatigue to promoting hormonal balance and emotional well-being.

=== Men's health ===
Traditionally, the rituals of Malay men were geared toward masculine strength, wellness, and especially sexual potency. In Malay culture, a man's overall health is measured by his virility. Tongkat Ali (Eurycoma longifolia) and Ubi Jaga (Smilax myosotiflora) have traditionally been thought to increase both sexual and overall energy, boost metabolism and improve fertility. Ubi Jaga is believed to increase blood circulation. Tongkat Ali has been scientifically studied and was indeed found to promote libido and increase testosterone blood levels.

== See also ==
- Jamu
- The useful plants of the Dutch East Indies
