= The useful plants of the Dutch East Indies =

Book series by Karel Heyne

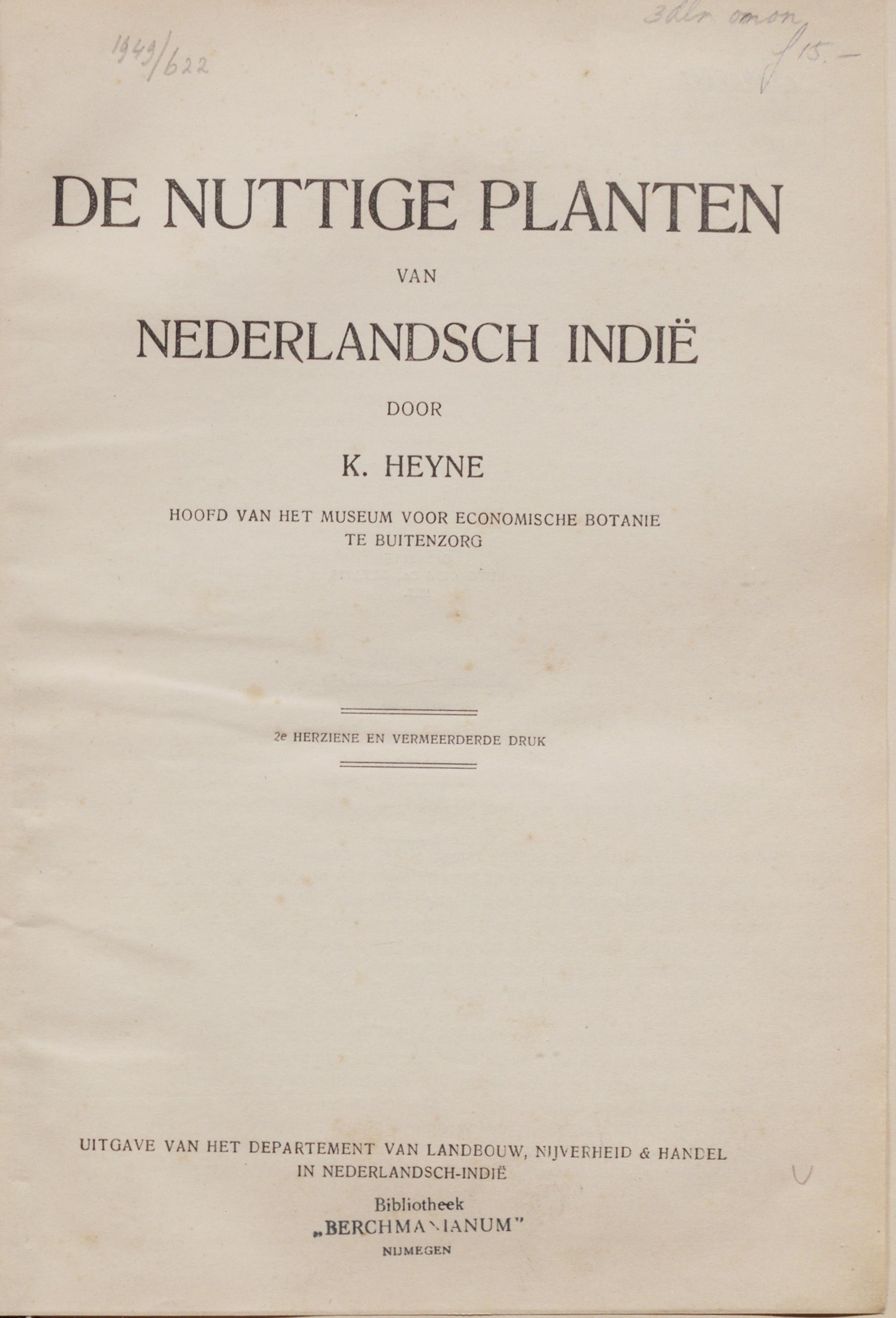
Title page of one of the books

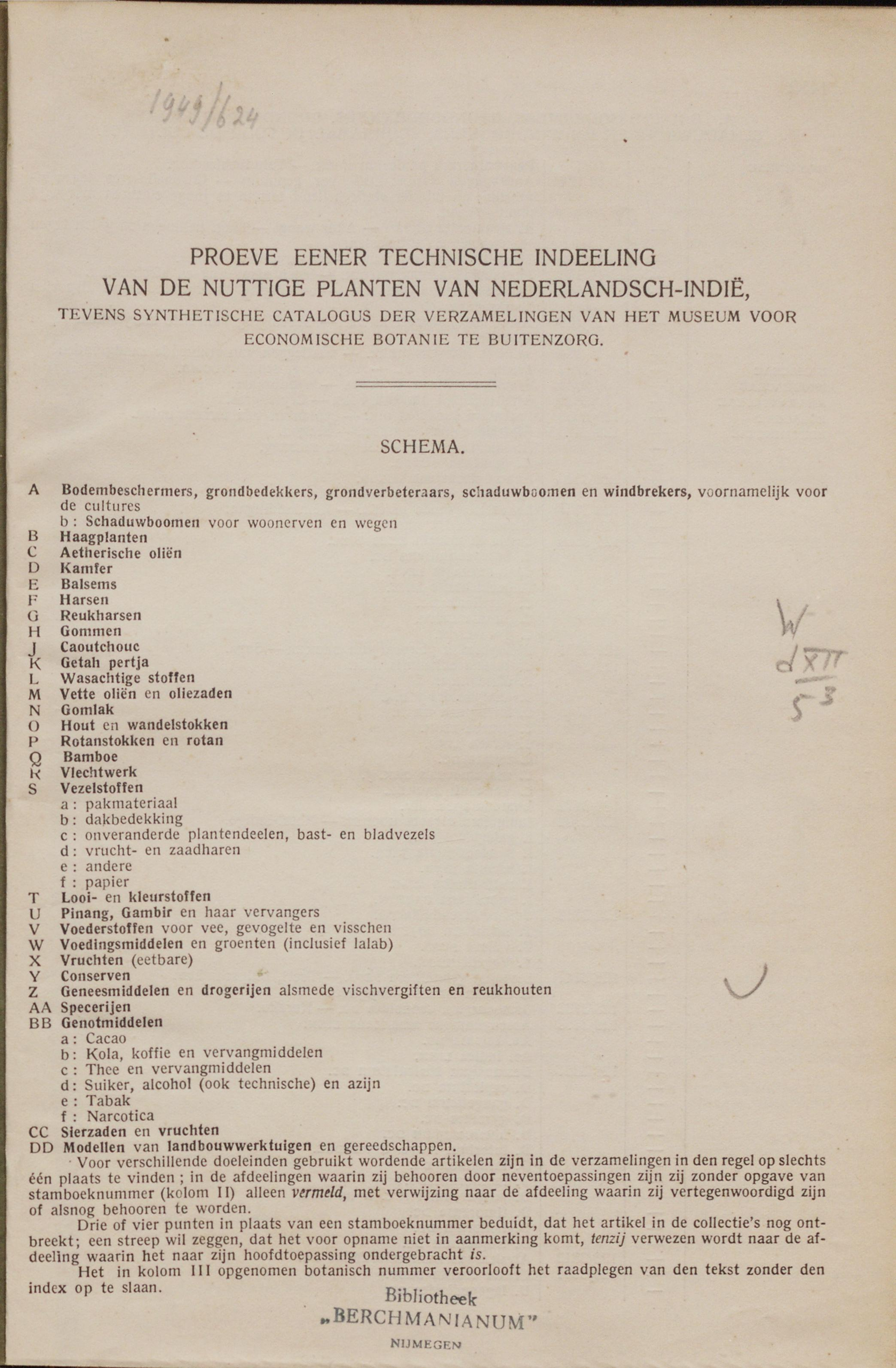
Page from one of the books with a schematic overview of the species

The useful plants of the Dutch East Indies (original Dutch title: De nuttige planten van Nederlands Indië) is a series of four descriptive botany books written by the Dutch botanist Karel Heyne (1877–1947). The series is the first descriptive catalogue about botanical plants and their economical use in the Dutch East Indies (now Indonesia). It became a standard reference and was received by the public with appreciation. The series was published in Dutch (1913–1917) by Ruygrok & Co. in Batavia (now Jakarta). The series was re-edited in 1922, 1927 and 1950.

== Context ==
In the first half of the 20th century, much of the world was under colonial rule, including the Dutch East Indies. New access to a wide array of previously unstudied plants allowed botanical research to flourish under colonial rule and became highly institutionalised. This was largely linked to the establishment of botanical gardens including greenhouses which allowed plants to be moved around globally. A high degree of attention was paid to indigenous uses of plants, and especially on their medical uses, known locally as jamu (also historically spelled djamoe), due to exposure to new diseases for which they knew no treatments. During the colonial period, Indonesian physicians had focused on Western medicine and were typically quite removed from the indigenous world, and therefore after Indonesian independence, works by Dutch authors, especially in the form of guides, became valuable resources in promoting further scientific research about jamu. However, colonial botanical research was also broadly directed towards plants that were economically significant, that could be processed to yield marketable products. Despite colonial interests, literature on this topic in the Dutch East Indies was lacking. The first series of books on the subject was The useful plants of the Dutch East Indies by Karel Heyne.

Karel Heyne resided in Buitenzorg (now Bogor) from 1906 to 1927, where he worked primarily in categorising local Javanese plants at the Buitenzorg Botanical Garden. This followed M. Treub, who had been appointed director of the botanical gardens in 1880, successfully arguing for support for research regarding Indonesian flora of economic significance. It is in this context that Heyne began writing his book, which aimed to categorise and catalogue the plants of economic significance present in the botanical garden's reserves, both with their local and scientific names, thus addressing the lack of publications on the matter. Through his books, he wished to lay fundamental groundwork for future botanical and sociological research on Indonesian flora, as with the exception of a small number of guide books, most of the information about the native plants' uses was simply unavailable prior to this book's publication.

While writing his book, Heyne, who had no formal training in taxonomy, collaborated a lot with other researchers posted at the botanical gardens, namely T. Valeton, C. A. Backer, and C. R. W. K. van Alderwerelt van Rosenburgh, who aided him primarily in identifying specimens. Whilst the degree to which they collaborated varied, with van Rosenburgh looking mostly at ferns and Valeton mostly at "ginger allies", Backer, whose worked focused on Javanese trees, provided a large number of plant names. There are also records of two autochthones, Arsin (? - 1913) and Sapei (1870–1934), who were employed at the botanical gardens and who, despite having no formal botanical training, are said to have been particularly good at identifying plants, including of incomplete specimens. The book series Herbarium Amboinense (1741) by G. E. Rumphius, which catalogued the flora of Amboina, was a major source of information for the content of Heyne's book, and Rumphius is referenced frequently, both for botanical descriptions and some traditional uses. Furthermore, Heyne corresponded extensively with Jans Kloppenburg-Versteegh, a Dutch-Indonesian expert on Indonesian herbal medicine who had herself authored a similar but smaller guide in 1907 focusing on medicinal plants, and she was deemed by Heyne to be one of the most reliable sources on this matter.

== Contents ==
In the initial four books (1913–1917) comprise gymnosperms and angiosperms. The first instalment of the four-part series published in 1913 was about monocotyledon and gymnosperms. Part two and three published in 1916 and 1917 were about Archichlamydeae, and part four published in 1917 was about Metachlamydeae. Besides these, the revision (1922–1950) also comprises algae, fungi, lichens and ferns. The plants in his initial four books and revisions are arranged according to the Engler system. The species are arranged per family. Each species is described with its scientific name and names used in the local dialect, after which a short description about the plant is included. This is followed by information on the occurrence, distribution and a detailed summary of the application and commercial importance. He refers to many other sources for example the books: Zoocecedica of the Netherlands East Indies for images and De Clercq’s plantkundig woordenboek for more local names. At the end of each book, a register of scientific names and local names is included.

== Editions, revisions and translations ==
The first instalment of the four-part series covering monocotyledon was published in 1913. Part two and three about Archichlamydeae, the subclass of dicotyledons, were published in 1916 and 1917. Part four about the subclass Metachlamydeae was published in 1917.

In 1922 the first instalment was completed and revised by including the families Gramineae and Cyperaceae. In 1927 they were all re-edited and issued in 3 volumes. The first two comprise only text including algae, fungi, lichens, ferns, gymnosperms and angiosperms. In the 1927 edition Heyne proposed an edition with illustrations and images on the relevant plants. His suggestions were not carried out due to the hesitant nature of the publishers with regards to the financial implications. Instead he refers to another book in is preface: Zoocecedica of the Netherlands East Indies, which was released at a similar time (1926) and does contain images and illustrations that Heyne had originally planned for.

In 1950 a reprint of two volumes of the 1927 edition was published. In this reprint the names and phrases that were not in agreement with the Sovereign State of Indonesia were edited or removed.

In 1984 there were three English copies of the four instalments (1913–1917). The copies were located at the Forestry Department in Kuala Lumpur, the Botanic Gardens in Singapore and at the Forest Research Institute in Kepong. It is unknown who authorised and made the translation.

In 1988 the four instalments were translated into Indonesian. The translation was made by Badan Penelitian dan Pengembangan Kehutanan (Agency for Forestry Research and Development). The series was published under the name Tumbuhan berguna Indonesia; terdiri atas empat jilid in Jakarta.

In 1983 Heyne's work was revised, completed, edited and translated into English for the project PROSEA (Plant Resources of South-East Asia). His work was included in a multivolume handbook about plant resources of South-East Asia called PROSEA. In these series consisting of 19 volumes, published from 1989 to 1999, the plants are organised in user groups ranging from medicinal and poisonous plants (volume 3) to vegetable oils and fats (volume 14).

== Reception ==
When De Nuttige Planten van Nederlandsch Indië was published in 1927 by Karel Heyne, it was received by academics in a unanimous manner of appreciation. Academics of the mid 20th century in northern Europe quickly deemed the book the most comprehensive book on tropical plants written to date. It was acknowledged that the second edition of the book was much more valuable than the first. The book was reviewed by the scientific community as an incredibly comprehensive book which considerably accelerated the knowledge of economic botany and tropical plants. H. Cammerloher mentions in his review, written at the time of publication, that Heyne's book is the most comprehensive book on tropical plants written to date. One drawback of the book was mentioned by S. Leefman, saying that the book is only available in Dutch. At the time of publication, the book was considered very valuable by academic botanists. To illustrate this point, Cammerloher stated that this book should be read by people with an interest in botany, anywhere in the world, not just in the Netherlands.

The aim of the author was to allow readers to identify the plant they see in front of them in a real-life situation; using the book as a quick guide manual. According to Leefman, this aim was achieved. Despite this book not having been used as a traditional textbook in primary to high schools, the book was used frequently by academics of tropical botany. Wettstein stated that the book would serve a great purpose in pedagogical scenarios. As direct evidence of its success at the time of its reception, it should be noticed that soon after the first instalment of the book was published, it was out of stock, and the fourth instalment was mentioned by the media.

The significance of the book lies within the generally unknown territory of tropical plants at the time. De Nuttige Planten van Nederlandsch Indië was the first of its kind to offer contents including an analysis of both native Dutch-Indonesian plants and plants used elsewhere, this made it an important source academics could turn to. The book has several unique characteristics which must be factored in to understand the extent to which it was received well by others. The book covers the characteristics of plants as well as how to process them and how they could be used, after reading the book, the reader is guaranteed a pronounced understanding of the plants mentioned. The book offers many sources used, which the reader may turn to if so desired, to find more detail and depth on the plants mentioned. The book includes all names in Latin, as well as common and used names in the text. This is special because typically only the used names are mentioned. The effect of this characteristic is that the book can be used as a direct source used to relate plants to their origin for analytical purposes.

Due to the importance and relevance of the book, it was continually improved and re-edited. Some small corrections were made but mainly, upon receiving more plant samples, a new issue was published. The book was of such significance that translations in both English and Bahasa Indonesian were proposed in 1927. The ministry in the Hague however did not provide the necessary assistance he needed as they did not see the use of investing in the project. In 1969 the idea was proposed again, and the project was well received. Two provisional teams were set up for an English and Indonesian copy, a detailed budget and programme were drafted and submitted. However, due to unexplained reasons this was not achieved, despite the significance and importance of the book at the time.

The author continued to release more publications with regards to the plant landscape in the Netherlands East Indies. In 1929 he released ‘Jaarboek van het Departement van Landbouw, Nijverheid en Handel in Nederlandsch-Indië’ which translates into ‘The yearbook of the department of agriculture, industry, and trade in the Netherlands East Indies’. The publications discusses the botanical, soil and microbe laboratories, plant disease, the botanical gardens he was working with, as well as general agriculture and more industrial related concepts such as the trade, businesses and policies. Further works he released include ‘Nota over het klapper-vraagstuk’ which translates to ‘Note on the achieve’. In his publication he lists a large range of plants by name and includes observations and details with regards to their time of flowering, fruit ripening and other details ranging with the species. It is a work of horticulture with an incentive coming from the economic incentives of the study of such plants.

The book also sparked the formation of an organization: the PROSEA programme. PROSEA is short for ‘Plant Resources of South-East Asia’. The scientific enterprise was founded in 1985 and produced a manual on tropical economic botany. It was to become a multi-volume hand-book on approximately 5000 useful plants in South-East Asia. In 1994 the hand-book was published in 8 volumes with 1790 species written by 320 authors. The handbook grew even further to 19 volumes in 2000. The content of all the volumes is now available at Pl@ntUse.

Heyne's work is still of great importance to the agriculture, horticulture, and forestry of Indonesia however development in landscapes some of his work has become obsolete; plants have disappeared, new plants have been introduced and plants have been given more or less importance and thus research and significance. The book has an archaic writing style and can consequently be understood by a rapidly decreasing number of people. The work stil has a great significance; the importance of his work and applicability of it is still being expanded and actualized.

== See also ==
- Flora of Indonesia
