= Burchill =

Burchill is a variant form of the English surname Birchall, deriving from the settlement of Birkel, Lancashire, and meaning Birch - hill. The village of Birkel later became "Birtle".

== Notable people named Burchill ==
- Charlie Burchill (born 1959), Scottish musician
- Julie Burchill (born 1959), English writer
- Katie Lea Burchill (a.k.a. Katarina Waters) (born 1980), English female professional wrestler
- Mark Burchill (born 1980), Scottish international soccer player
- Paul Burchill (a.k.a. Birchall) (born 1979), English wrestler
- Thomas F. Burchill (1882–1955), American politician

== See also ==
- Birchall (surname)
- Burkill
