= Birchall =

Birchall is an English surname deriving from the settlement of Birkle, Lancashire, and derived from Birch - hill. The village of Birkle later became "Birtle".

Variant forms include Burchall and Burchill.

It is most commonly found in the North-West of England, particularly Lancashire. The highest proportion of bearers can be found in Wigan, Greater Manchester. The first recorded bearer was John de Birchall de Birtles in 1401.

The surname is less commonly found in other areas of the former British Empire, including Canada and the United States. Only one early migrant to Australia was recorded with this name, a convicted criminal, James Stanley Birchall, a Protestant from Chorley in Lancashire; on 10 April 1851 he was sent to Norfolk Island for committing forgery.

The surname is also found in Sussex where it appears to have originated from the village of Billingshurst, where it can be found in the sixteenth century in its original form of Burchfold; this changed to Burchall in the mid-seventeenth century. A branch of the family migrated to Guildford, Surrey where they supplied two mayors – John and Richard Burchall, who entered a pedigree in the Heralds Visitations.

== Notable people with the name ==
Surname

- Adam Birchall (born 1984), Welsh football forward
- Ben Birchall, Australian musician
- Ben Birchall (born 1977), World Champion motorcycle sidecar racing driver
- Cathy Birchall (c. 1957–2013), British long-distance motorcyclist
- Chris Birchall (born 1984), English–Trinidadian football midfielder
- Chris Birchall (rugby league) (born 1981), Scottish rugby league and rugby union player
- Ed Birchall (1923–1988), American clown
- Edward Vivian Birchall (1884–1916), English philanthropist
- Ellis Birchall (fl. 1945), English football back
- Grant Birchall (born 1988), Australian rules footballer
- Ian Birchall (born 1939), British Marxist historian and translator
- Jack Birchall (born 1876, date of death unknown), English footballer
- James Derek Birchall (1930–1995), English chemist and inventor
- Jared Birchall (born 1974), CEO of Neuralink
- John Birchall (1875–1941), British soldier and Conservative Party politician
- Johnston Birchall (1951–1921), British academic
- Joseph Birchall (fl. 1902–1903), English football winger
- Jud Birchall (1855–1887), American baseball left fielder
- Leonard Birchall (1915–2004), Canadian air force officer
- Paul Birchall (a.k.a. Burchill) (born 1979), English wrestler
- Reginald Birchall (1866–1890), British conman
- Richard Birchall (born 1887, date of death unknown), English professional footballer
- Robert Birchall (c. 1750–1819), English music seller, publisher, and instrument dealer
- Shannon Birchall, Australian bassist
- Tom Birchall (born 1986), World Champion motorcycle sidecar racing passenger

Given name

- Birchall Pearson (1914–1960), Canadian athlete

Fictional character

- Suzie Birchall in Coronation Street

== See also ==
- Burchill
