= Burkill =

Burkill is a surname. Notable people with the surname include:

- Albert Burkill (1839–1913), British businessman
- John Charles Burkill (1900–1993), English mathematician
- Humphrey Morrison Burkill (1914–2006), botanist
- Isaac Henry Burkill (1870–1965), English botanist
