= Jamu =

Indonesian traditional herbs or spices drink

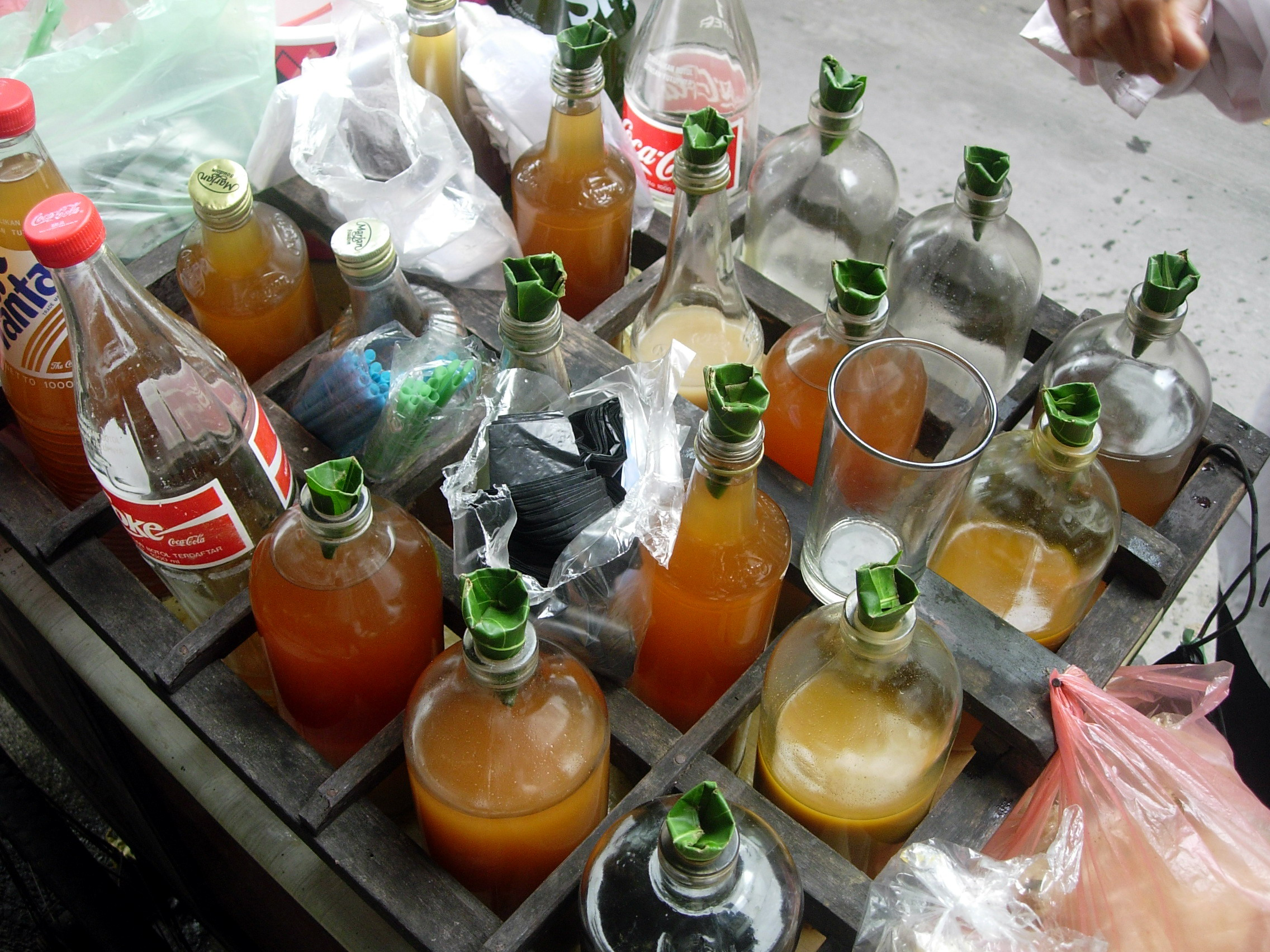
- Different types of jamu held in bottles, Solo, Central Java
- Type: Traditional Medicine
- Material: Herbs, Spices
- Place of origin: Java, Indonesia

Jamu wellness culture
- UNESCO Intangible Cultural Heritage
- Country: Indonesia
- Reference: 01972
- Region: Asia and the Pacific

Inscription history
- Inscription: 2023 (18th session)
- List: Representative

Jamu (Javanese script: ꦗꦩꦸ) is a traditional medicine from Indonesia. It is predominantly a herbal medicine made from natural materials, such as roots, bark, flowers, seeds, leaves and fruits. Materials acquired from animals, such as honey, royal jelly, milk and native chicken eggs are often used as well.

In 2019, Jamu was officially recognized as one of Indonesia's intangible cultural heritage by the Indonesian Ministry of Education and Culture. Subsequently in December 2023 Jamu wellness culture is officially recognized as UNESCO Intangible Cultural Heritage of Indonesia.

Jamu can be found throughout Indonesia; however, it is most prevalent in Java, where Mbok Jamu, the traditional kain kebaya-wearing young to middle-aged Javanese woman carrying bamboo basket, filled with bottles of jamu on her back, travelling villages and towns alleys, offering her fares of traditional herbal medicine, can be found. In many large cities, jamu herbal medicine is sold on the street by hawkers who carry a refreshing drink, usually bitter but sweetened with honey or palm sugar.

Herbal medicine is also produced in factories by large companies such as Air Mancur, Djamu Djago or Sido Muncul, and sold at various drug stores in sachet packaging. Packaged dried jamu should be dissolved in hot water first before drinking. Nowadays, herbal medicine is also sold in the form of tablets, caplets and capsules. These jamu brands are united in an Indonesian Herbal and Traditional Medicine Association, locally known as Gabungan Pengusaha Jamu (GP Jamu). Today, jamu is a growing local herbal medicine industry worth millions of dollars. In 2014, jamu contributed Rp 3 trillion (US$73.29 million) to overall sales.

== Etymology ==
The word jamu is of Javanese origin. It derives from the Javanese words jawa (ꦗꦮ, "Javanese" or "Java"), and ngramu (ꦔꦿꦩꦸ, "mixing" or "gathering" (the ingredients)). It roughly translates to "concoction made by the Javanese" or "concoction originating from Java".

Another theory suggests that the word jamu is derived from the ancient Javanese term jampi (Aksara Jawa: ꦗꦩ꧀ꦥꦶ, "magic formula"), referring to the mantras cast by dukuns (the indigenous shamans) to the potion. It is also believed that jamu was initially used by dukuns as one of the spiritual requirements for black magic practices.

== Traditional production centers ==
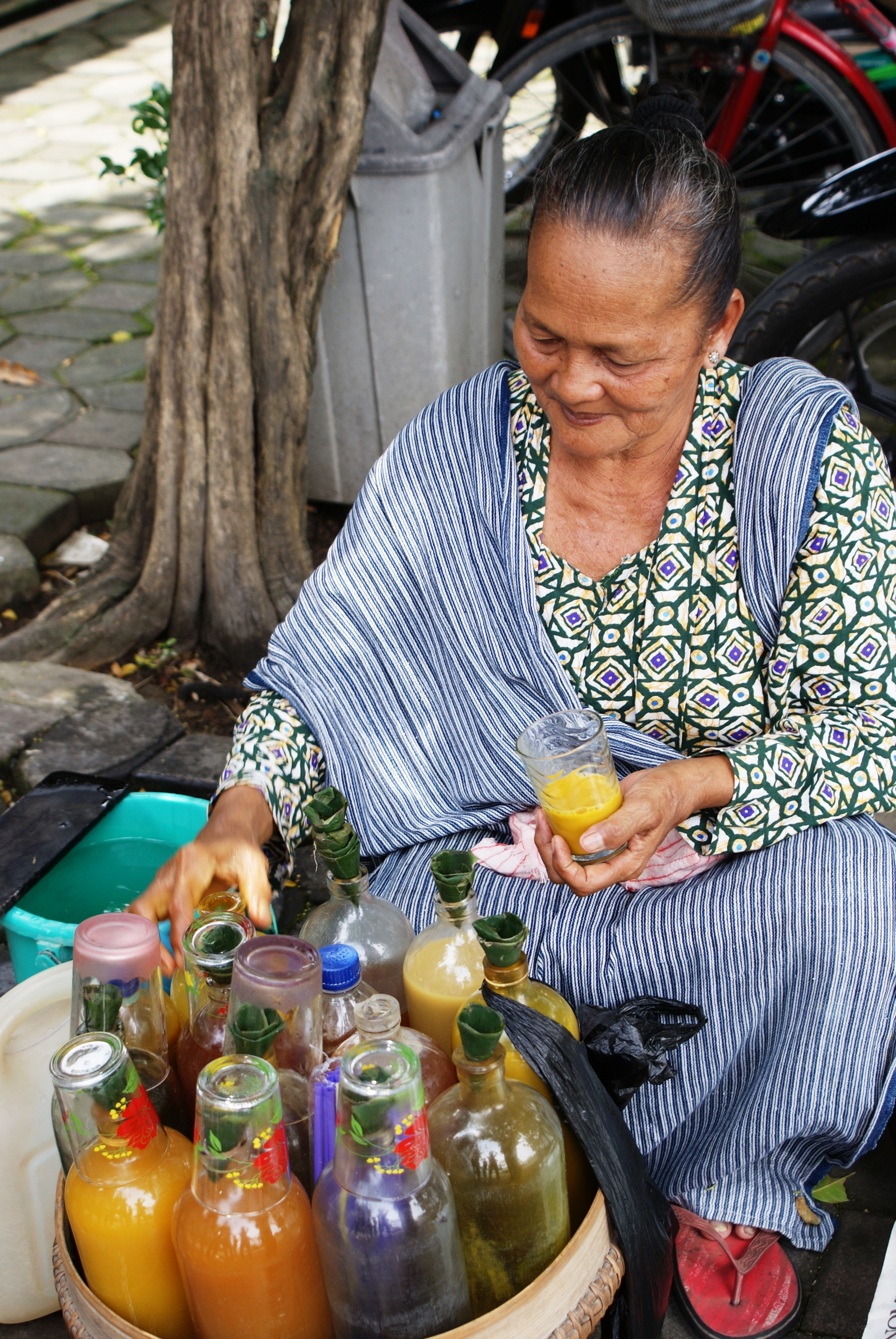
An elderly mbok jamu gendong, jamu-seller woman

Despite jamu's popularity throughout Indonesia, it seems that jamu culture is most prevalent in Java. The jamu herbal culture is prevalent in Javanese royal courts of Yogyakarta and Surakarta, where the ancient books on herbal medicine is kept in royal library, and jamu medicine is prescribes to royalties and nobles in Javanese keratons. According to Javanese tradition, the famed beauty of putri keraton (princess and palace ladies) is owed to jamu and lulur (traditional lotion).

Sukoharjo in Central Java, in particular, is believed to be one of the centers of jamu tradition. Many of the Mbok Jamu jamu sellers ladies are hailed from this town. The traditional jamu herbal traders in Sukoharjo have established the statue of the jamu seller as Sukoharjo's identity in Bulakrejo. Commonly called "jamu herbal seller statue", it depicts a farmer and a jamu gendong herbalist carrying her wares. Sukoharjo regions, particularly sub-district Nguter, is known as the place of origin of Mbok Jamu gendong herbalist in many big cities, such as Jakarta, Bandung, Bogor, and Surabaya.

== History ==
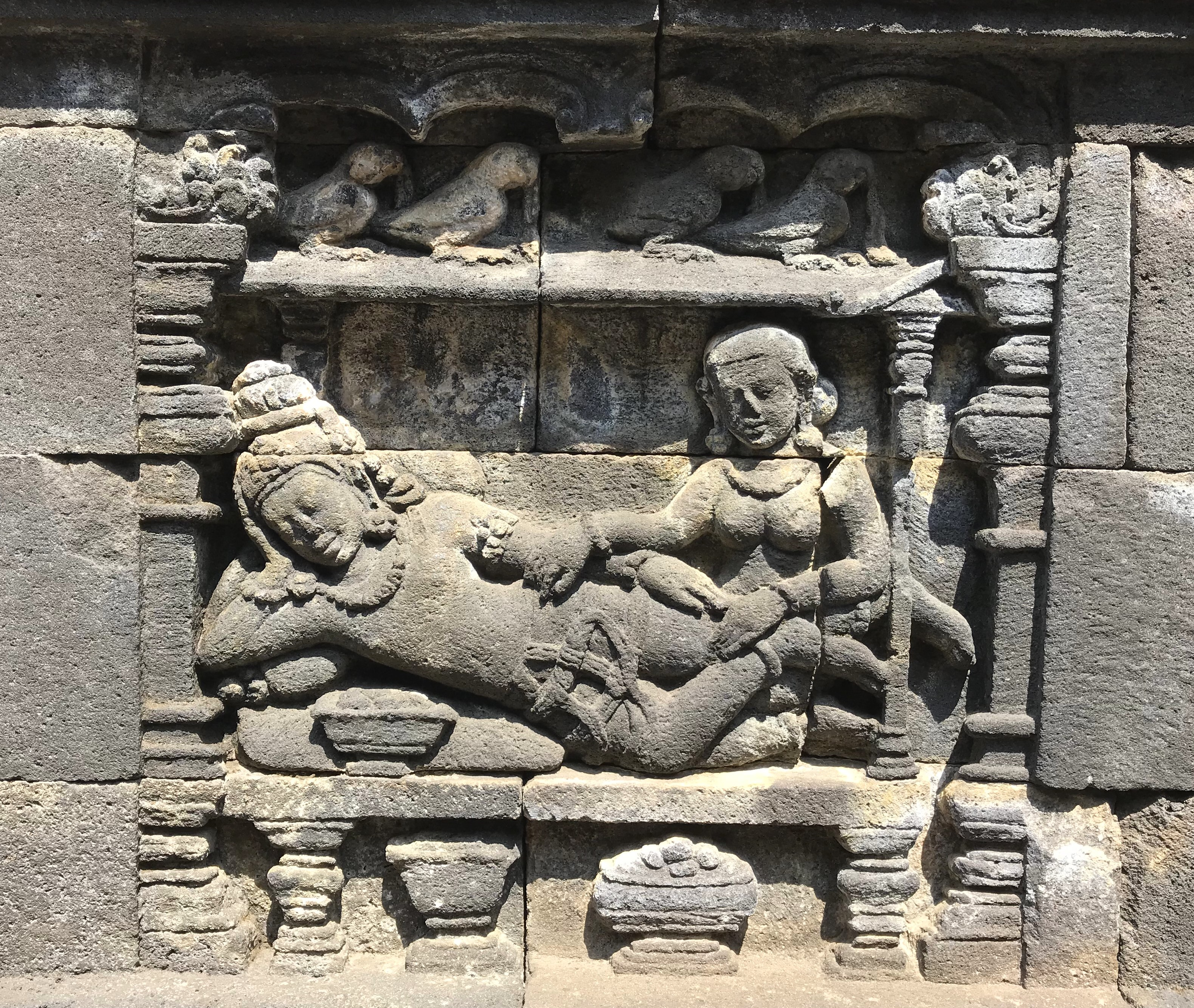
A bas-relief in Borobudur depicting a masseuse treating her client

Jamu is believed to have originated in the Mataram kingdom era, c. 1300 years ago. The stone mortar and pestle with long cylindrical stone mortar — the type commonly used in today's traditional jamu making- was discovered in Liyangan archaeological site on the slopes of Mount Sundoro, Central Java. The site and relics are dated from Mataram kingdom era circa 8th to 10th century, which suggests that the herbal medicine tradition of jamu had already taken hold by then. The bas-reliefs on Borobudur depict images of people grinding something with stone mortar and pestle, drink sellers, physicians and masseuse treating their clients. All of these scenes might be interpreted as traditional herbal medicine and health-related treatments in ancient Java. The Madhawapura inscription from Majapahit period mentioned a specific profession of herb mixer and combiner (herbalist), called Acaraki. The medicine book from Mataram dated from circa 1700 contains 3,000 entries of jamu recipes, while Javanese classical literature Serat Centhini (1814) describes some jamu herbal concoction recipes.

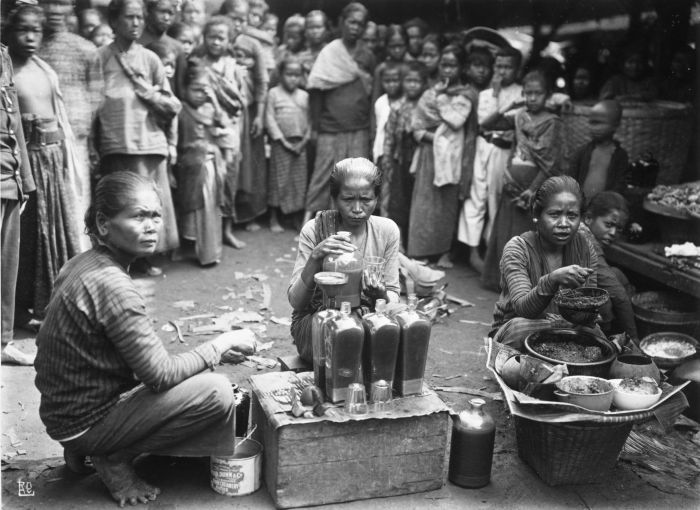
Jamu sellers in Yogyakarta, ca. 1910

Though heavily influenced by Ayurveda from India, Indonesia is a vast archipelago with numerous indigenous plants not found in India, and includes plants similar to Australia beyond the Wallace Line. Jamu may vary from region to region, and the recipes are often not written down, especially in remote areas of the country.

Jamu was (and still) practiced as one of the spiritual requirements of the indigenous physicians (dukuns). However, it is generally prepared and prescribed by women who sell it on the streets. Generally, the different jamu prescriptions are not written down but handed down between generations. Some early handbooks, however, have survived. A jamu handbook that was used in households throughout the Dutch East Indies (present-day Indonesia) was published in 1911 by Mrs. Kloppenburg-Versteegh.

One of the first European physicians to study jamu was Jacobus Bontius (Jacob de Bondt), who was a physician in Batavia (present-day Jakarta) in the early seventeenth century. His writings contain information about indigenous medicine of Java. A comprehensive book on indigenous herbal medicine in the Dutch East Indies (present-day Indonesia) was published by Rumphius, who worked in Ambon during early eighteenth century. He published a book called Herbaria Amboinesis (The Ambonese Spice Book). During the nineteenth century, European physicians had a keen interest in jamu, as they often did not know how to treat the diseases they encountered in their patients in the Dutch East Indies (present-day Indonesia). The German physician Carl Waitz published on jamu in 1829. In the 1880s and 1890s, A.G. Vorderman published extensive accounts on jamu as well. Pharmacological research on herbal medicine was undertaken by M. Greshoff and W.G. Boorsma at the pharmacological laboratory at the Bogor Botanical Garden

== Popularity ==
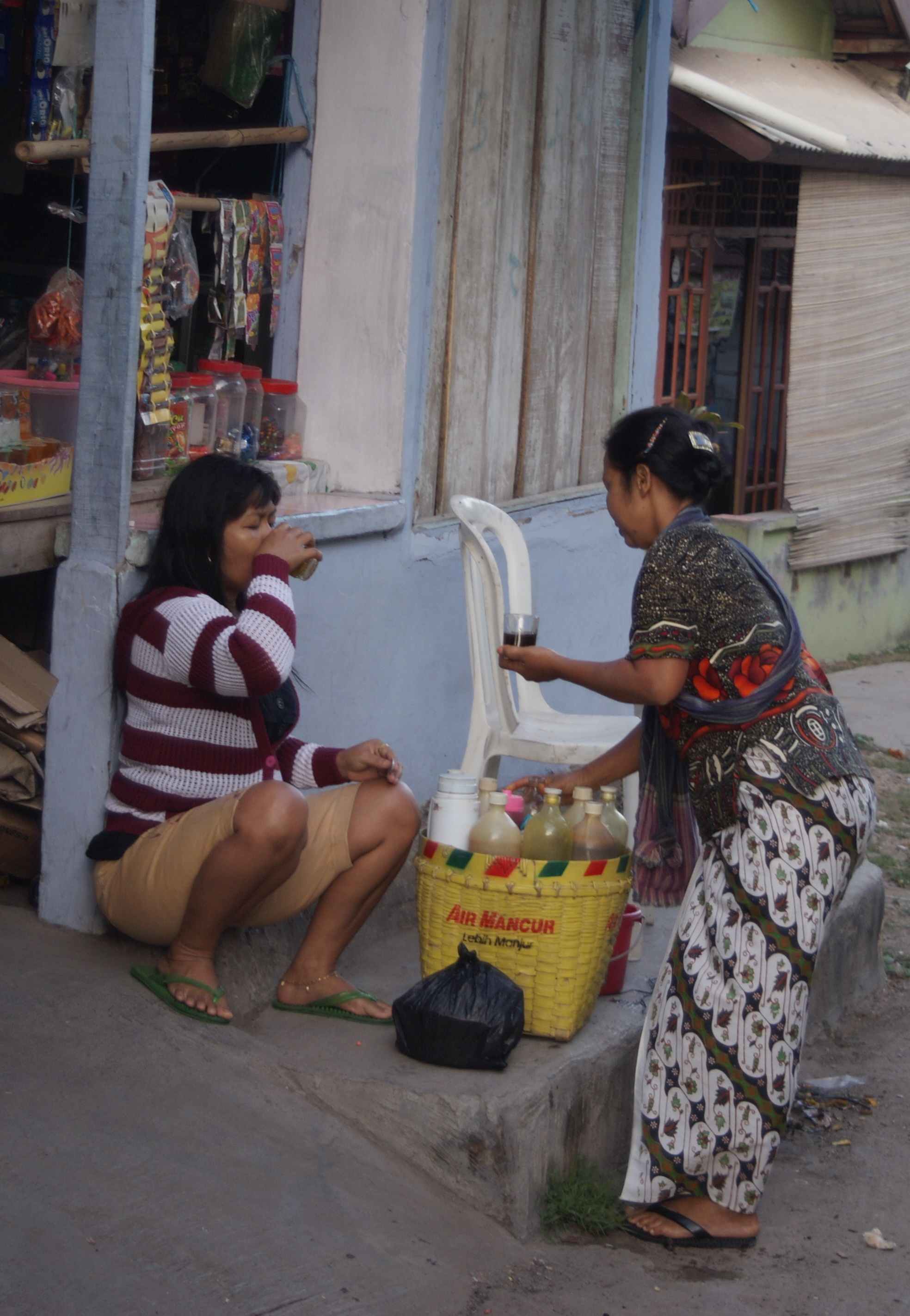
Travelling Mbok Jamu selling jamu gendong attending to her customer

Indonesian physicians were initially not very interested in jamu. During the second conference of the Indonesian Association of Physicians, held in Solo in March 1940, two presentations on the topic were given. During the Japanese occupation, Indonesia's Jamu Committee was formed in 1944. During the following decades, the popularity of jamu increased, although physicians had rather ambivalent opinions about it.

Indonesia—home to highly diversified herbs products—expects domestic sales of herbal and traditional medicine, including food supplements and cosmetics, to expand by 15 percent by 2014 to Rp 15 trillion (US$1.23 billion) compared to 2013, due to its increasingly health-conscious middle-income bracket, according to the Indonesian Herbal and Traditional Medicine Association (Gabungan Pengusaha Jamu/GP Jamu). Jamu contributes Rp 3 trillion (US$73.29 million) to overall sales.

Several Indonesian leading figures are known as the endorser of jamu herbal products, including former first lady Tien Soeharto, business figures Mooryati Soedibyo and Jaya Suprana, and President Joko Widodo. Joko admitted that he had consumed the herbal medicine, locally known as temulawak jahe (the mixture of ginger and curcuma) for 17 years which he believed has helped him in his daily activities as well as to repair the liver and digestive functions.

The 2025 Netflix film Abadi nan Jaya (The Elixir) centers around a zombie outbreak caused by jamu intended to reverse aging.

== Form ==
Jamu is often distributed in the form of powder, pills, capsules, and drinking liquid. Jamu shops, which sell only ingredients or prepare the jamu on the spot as required by buyers, as well as women roaming the street to sell jamu, are common ways to distribute jamu in Indonesia. Nowadays, jamu is also mass-manufactured and exported. There are often concerns about quality, consistency, and cleanliness, not only in the locally distributed but also the manufactured forms.

== Quasi-health ==
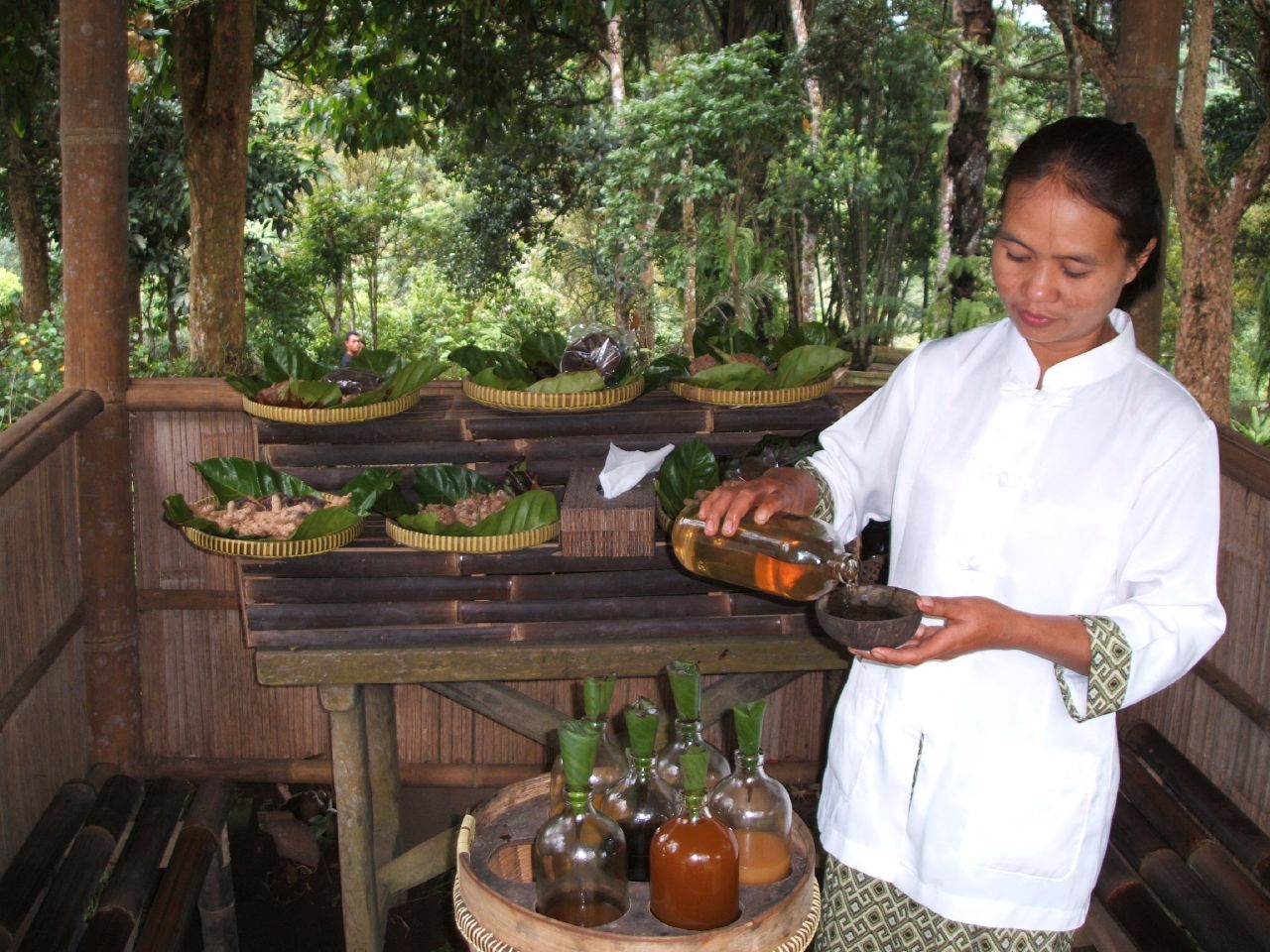
Jamu warung in Central Java

There are a few quasi-health-related uses for jamu, for example, curiously promoted to enhance sexual pleasure, but also traditionally manage post childbirth trauma. There are kinds of jamu to increase sexual stamina for men, as well as others to tighten the vagina for women (with names like Sari Rapat ("Essence of Tightness"), Rapat Wangi ("Tight and Fragrant"), and even Empot Ayam ("Tight as a Chicken's Anus"). Some exported to far as Kenya under names Tongkat ajimat madura, or madura sticks.

== Herbs for jamu ==
There are hundreds of herbs for jamu prescriptions; some are:

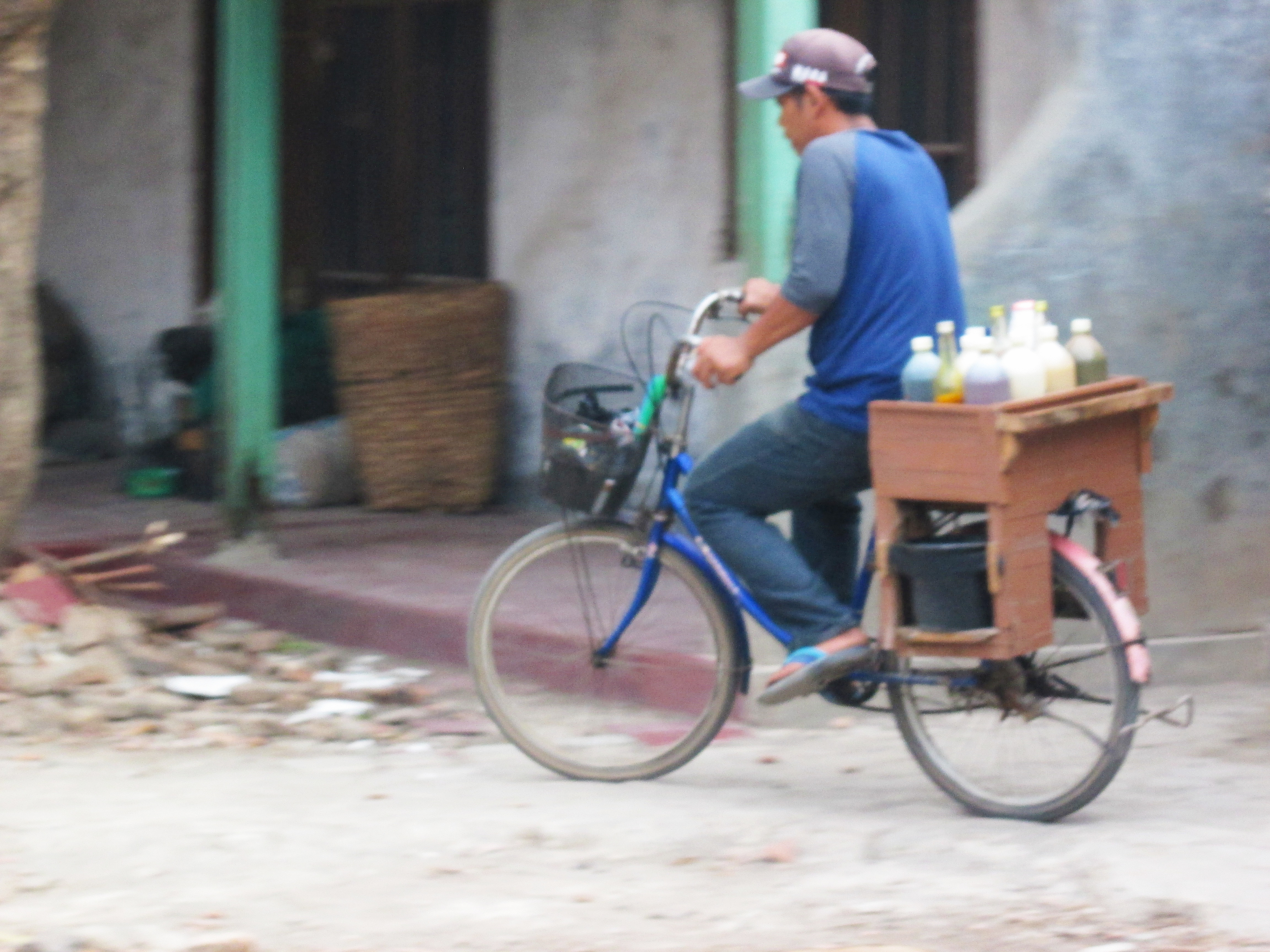
Not only jamu sold by mbok jamu (woman) but jamu also sold by mamang jamu (male) by bicycle

- Rhizomes:
  - Bengle (Zingiber brevifolium)
  - Jahe Ginger (Zingiber officinale)
  - Kencur Aromatic Galangal (Kaempferia galanga)
  - Kunyit Turmeric (Curcuma domestica)
  - Lempuyang (Zingiber zerumbet or Zingiber aromaticum)
  - Lengkuas or Laos Greater Galangal (Alpinia galanga)
  - Temulawak (Curcuma xanthorrhiza)
- Leaves:
  - Brotowali or bratawali (Tinospora crispa or Tinospora tuberculata rumphii)
  - Sambang Darah (Excoecaria cochinchinensis or Excoecaria bicolor)
  - Secang (Caesalpinia sappan)
- Seeds:
  - Adas (Foeniculum vulgare Mill)
- Fruits:
  - Asam Jawa tamarind (Tamarindus indica)
  - Ceplukan Cutleaf groundcherry (Physalis angulata)
  - Jeruk Nipis Key lime (Citrus aurantifolia Swingle)
  - Nyamplung or kosambi (Calophyllum inophyllum)
- Barks
  - Kayu Manis Cinnamon (Cinnamomum burmannii)
- Flowers
  - Ilang-ilang Ylang ylang (Cananga odorata)
  - Melati Jasmine (Jasminum sambac)
  - Rumput Alang-alang (Gramineae)

== Non-herbal elements of jamu ==
Non-herbal materials acquired from animals are also often used in jamu mixture. Among others are:

- Insects
  - Honey
  - Royal jelly
  - Bee larvae
  - Certain types of insects, including larvae
  - Ant nest
- Cattles and dairy products
  - Milks from various species, including cow, buffalo, goat and horse
  - Goat's bile
- Poultry
  - ayam kampung eggs
- Sea creatures
  - Dried seahorse
  - Dried sea cucumber

== Adulteration ==
Under Indonesian Food and Drug Authority (BPOM) regulations, jamu (and other herbal medication) products may not contain any pharmaceutical drug ingredients (Indonesian: bahan kimia obat, BKO), whether originating from an over-the-counter or a prescription-only substance. The BPOM regularly seizes such illegal products, mostly towards jamu marketed for sexual health, which may contain active ingredients in erectile dysfunction drugs such as sildenafil or tadalafil, as well those marketed for sore muscles (pegal linu), which may contain either NSAIDs such as diclofenac or meloxicam, corticosteroids such as dexamethasone, or the over-the-counter analgesic paracetamol.

Reports of adulterated jamu products have also been reported outside Indonesia by international health authorities. One example, Tawon Liar, was found to contain hidden drug ingredients (namely meloxicam and ketorolac, as well as dexamethasone, and in a 2026 update, the opioid tapentadol) (Note: The health authorities of New Caledonia, according to BPOM press release, reported that a different opioid, tramadol, was present in Tawon Liar, possibly from a different batch.) by the U.S. Food and Drug Administration, while another such product, Montalin, was found to contain piroxicam and paracetamol according to Health Sciences Authority of Singapore and Saudi Food and Drug Authority.

== See also ==
- Ramuan
- The useful plants of the Dutch East Indies
