= Jans Kloppenburg-Versteegh =

Dutch East-Indian herbalist

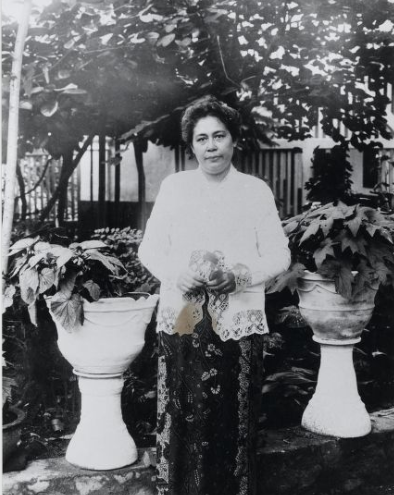

Jans Kloppenburg-Versteegh (1862–1948) (shortened to J. Kloppenburg-Versteegh) was an Indo-Dutch Herbalist.

== Biography ==
Versteegh was born in Central Java (then part of the Dutch East Indies) in May 1862. Versteegh was of Indo-European heritage; her father was an administrator of a coffee plantation. Versteegh gained an interest in local herbs at a young age, learning in how to apply herbal knowledge to local medicine. She went on to publish a number of books on the subject.

== Published works ==
- Kloppenburg-Versteegh, J., Indische planten en haar geneeskracht, Semarang: Masman & Stroink, 1907
