= Humphrey Morrison Burkill =

- Born: 8 December 1914; Singapore, Straits Settlements
- Died: 12 July 2006 (aged 91); Plymouth, United Kingdom
- Spouse: Joan Bloomer
- Children: 1 son and 1 daughter

Humphrey Morrison Burkill OBE (8 December 1914 – 12 July 2006), was a director of the Singapore Botanic Gardens from 1957 to 1969.

== Early life and education ==
Burkill was born to Isaac Henry Burkill and Ethel Maud Morrison on 8 December 1914 in the Director's House on the grounds of the gardens of the Singapore Botanic Gardens. When Burkill was four, he was put in the care of a family from Yorkshire, and attended a preparatory school when he was eight. He attended Repton School when he was thirteen, and later attended Gonville and Caius College, Cambridge. He studied in the University of Cambridge and received a Bachelor of Arts in 1936. He received his postgraduate degree in crop husbandry in 1939.

== Career ==
After getting a job from Dunlop Malayan Estates, Burkill returned to British Malaya to become a rubber planter, and learnt Malay and Tamil, which was expected of him, as well as Telugu and Thai. He later joined the Federated Malay States Volunteer Force.

As the Japanese invaded Malaya during World War II, Burkill became part of the retreat to Singapore, after which he seconded to the Royal Engineers. Following the Fall of Singapore, he was detained in Changi Prison by the Japanese. He was sent to a labour camp in Thailand, where he collected wood cut in the countryside and transported it down a river. As he could speak Thai, he communicated with the local villagers and secretly did illicit trading.

After the Japanese surrendered, he returned to Malaya to work for Dunlop, and became a botanist for the Rubber Research Institute of Malaya in 1948.

Burkill was appointed as the assistant director of the gardens in 1954 by then Gardens director M. R. Henderson. He became the director in 1957, succeeding John William Purseglove. He oversaw changes in the staff when Singapore became part of Malaysia, with the largely British administrators and researchers being replaced by locals such as Chew Wee Lek and Chang Khiaw Lan. He oversaw the first serious investigation of Malayan seaweeds. Burkill delivered a paper on the Role of Singapore Botanic Gardens in the development of orchid hybrids in Singapore during the 1963 World Orchid Conference in Singapore.

Burkill retired from his position as director in the middle of 1969. He was offered work at the Royal Botanic Gardens Kew to revise Useful Plants of West Tropical Africa, which was written by J. M. Dalziel and published in 1937.

== Personal life ==
Burkill married Joan Bloomer on 28 June 1946. They have a son and a daughter. Following his retirement, he and his family moved to England. His wife died in 2004. Burkill died on 12 July 2006 at his residence in Plymouth, England.

== Accolades ==
Burkill was awarded the OBE during the 1970 New Year Honours.

== Legacy ==
The Director's House on the grounds of the Gardens was later renamed Burkill Hall after both Burkill and his father.
