= Joseph Birchall =

English footballer

Personal information
- Full name: Joseph Birchall
- Place of birth: England
- Position: Winger

Senior career*
Years	Team	Apps	(Gls)
1902–1903	Burnley	12	(1)
1903	Preston North End	0	(0)
- * Club domestic league appearances and goals

Joseph Birchall was a professional English footballer who played as a winger.
