= Robert Birchall =

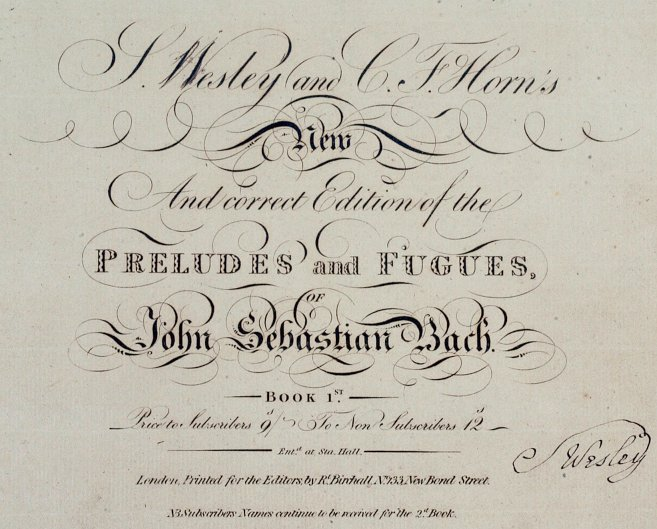
Part of the title page of Robert Birchall's 1810 English edition of Johann Sebastian Bach's Well-Tempered Clavier

Robert Birchall (c. 1750 – 19 December 1819) was an English music seller, publisher, and instrument dealer.

== Biography ==
Scholars had originally placed his birthdate to be c. 1760, but Birchall's age in a 1772 deposition is given as "22 years or thereabouts". Born in London, he may have been apprenticed by 1771 to William Randall, the cousin and one of the successors of printer John Walsh. In 1783, he partnered with a one "T. Beardmore" as Beardmore & Birchall before leaving for another partnership with Hugh Andrews that same year. He issued publications under the names Birchall & Andrews and Birchall & Co. from 1783 to May 1789 when the partnership was dissolved, Andrews taking on the business by himself. From 1789 onward, Birchall continued alone in publishing works, operating out of his address at Bond Street.

Birchall enjoyed a collaboration with composer Ludwig van Beethoven, which began in May 1805 with the publication of Beethoven's Violin Sonata in A major (Op. 47). Birchall also published the original English editions of the piano adaption of Wellington's Victory (Op. 91), the Violin Sonata in G Major (Op. 96), the Piano Trio in B flat major (Op. 97), and Anton Diabelli's piano adaptation of Beethoven's Symphony No. 7. He purchased the copyrights for these four works from Beethoven in 1815. During his later years, Birchall's correspondence with Beethoven also mentioned other possible projects, but these never came to fruition; this was partly a result of Beethoven's high fees and Birchall's declining health. In addition to Beethoven's works, Birchall printed various glees, country dance books, and Italian vocal works. He also published works by George Frideric Handel and Johann Sebastian Bach, including the first English edition of the Well-Tempered Clavier in 1810 edited by Samuel Wesley and Charles Frederick Horn. After Birchall's death, his employee Christopher Lonsdale took over the firm.
