= Cornelis Andries Backer =

Dutch botanist and pteridologist

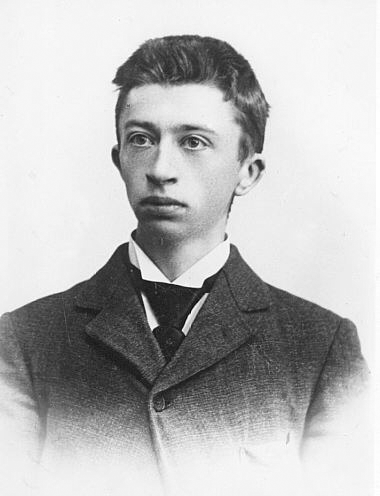
- Backer (September 1900) – 26 years old
- Born: 18 September 1874; Oudenbosch, the Netherlands
- Died: 22 February 1963 (aged 88); Heemstede, the Netherlands
- Known for: Flora of Java
- Scientific career
- Fields: Botany, plant systematics, pteridology
- Institutions: Leiden University, Rijksherbarium

Signature
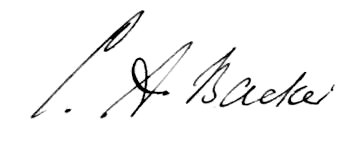

Cornelis Andries Backer (1874–1963) was a Dutch botanist and pteridologist. He was born on 18 September 1874 in Oudenbosch and died on 22 February 1963 at Heemstede, The Netherlands. He stayed thirty years in the Dutch East Indies and did research on plant taxonomy on the islands of Java and Madura.

== Biography ==
=== Netherlands (1874–1900) ===
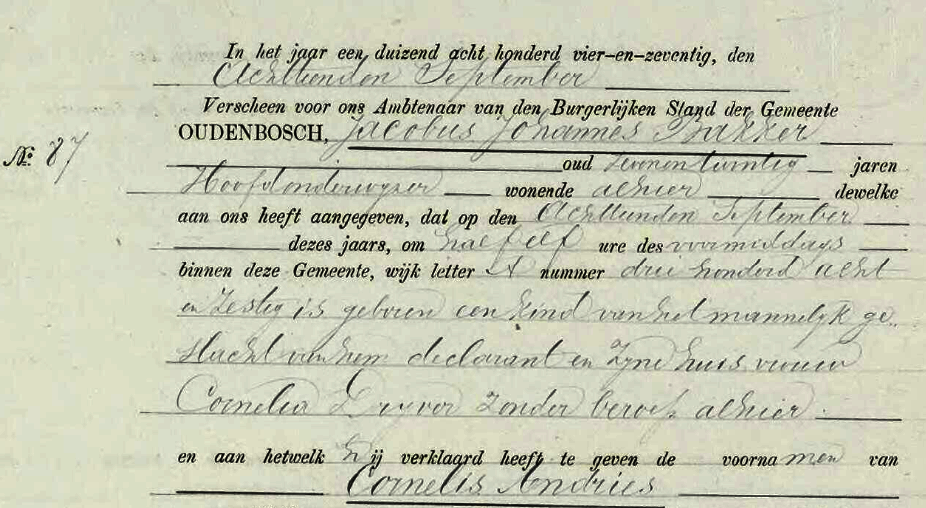
Birth certificate (1874)

From his father's side Backer was a scion of a family of school teachers, from his mother's of the lesser peasantry. On his birth certificate his surname was written Bakker instead of Backer. Following time-honoured custom Backer, when fifteen, attended the State Teachers’ Seminary at Haarlem (1889–1893). His interest in botany had already expressed itself at the Seminary. After his finals he had posts at several small villages. This was the time that he came into contact with contemporary Dutch botanists including Hendrik Heukels (1854–1936) and Eduard Heimans (1861–1914).

=== Dutch East Indies (1901–1930) ===
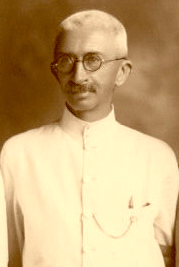
Backer (12 August 1930) – 55 years old (Tosari, East Java)

==== Weltevreden ====
In 1901 Backer left the Netherlands and went to the Dutch East Indies. Between 1901 and 1905 he was employed as a primary school teacher at a private boarding school in Weltevreden (Batavia), (now Gambir, the centre of Jakarta in Java. Immediately he started to collect the plants around him, but to name them unreliable or incomplete treatises had been written, now also outdated and often not readily available. Thus, he decided to write one himself, with the flora of his immediate surroundings as a start, and this marked a milestone in his life and for Malesian botany.

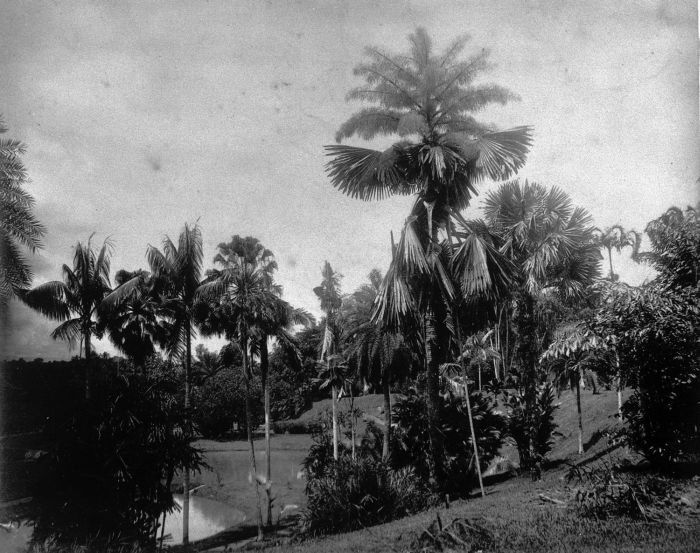
’s Lands Plantentuin in Buitenzorg (1910)

==== Buitenzorg ====
He came into contact with Melchior Treub (1851–1910), the Director of 's Lands Plantentuin in Buitenzorg (now the Bogor Botanical Gardens). Through Treub’s mediation Backer was given an appointment as Assistant at the Laboratory with as instruction to write a critical school flora for Java and to teach at the Agricultural School at Buitenzorg. From 1905 till 1924 Backer was employed at the botanical gardens. He scoured the fields and forests of Java, Madura, and the adjacent Kangean Islands, and so collected about 30,000 specimens while making daily trips of thirty to forty kilometres on foot.

==== Pasuruan ====
From 1924 till 1931 Backer was employed at the ‘Proefstation voor de Java-Suikerindustrie’ (Experimental Station for the sugar industry of Java) in Pasuruan on East Java. He wrote a flora on the weeds of the cane fields of Java (753 species).

==== The problem of volcano Krakatao ====
Melchior Treub sent Backer on two expeditions to the volcano Krakatao, in 1906 and in 1908. In 1929 Backer published his contentious book The problem of Krakatao, as seen by a botanist, in which he maintained that not all plant life had been destroyed by the gigantic eruption of the volcano, but that rootstocks and diaspores might have been buried to sprout again. Indeed, this possibility cannot be ruled out completely because of the failure of the Government to undertake any research immediately after the 1883 eruption of Krakatoa. Only as late as June 1886 the first biologist, Melchior Treub, came to take stock, but grasses had already been observed on the slopes in 1884 by the Dutch geologist Rogier Verbeek (1845–1926).

=== Back in the Netherlands (1931–1963) ===
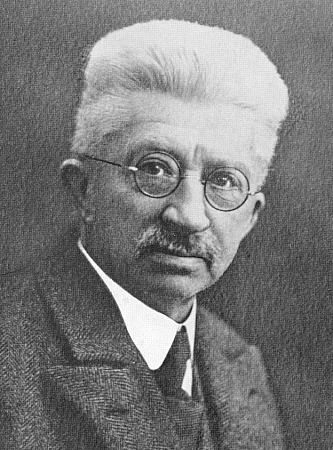
Backer (1934) – 60 years old

In 1931 Backer and his family returned to the Netherlands. They first lived in Haarlem and then settled in Heemstede where he worked until his last years on his ‘magnum opus’, the Flora of Java. Backer made Reinier Cornelis Bakhuizen van den Brink Jr. (1911–1987) co-author of the Flora of Java. On 22 February 1963 Cornelis Andries Backer passed away. The Flora of Java was posthumously published in three parts (1964–1968). In this flora about 6,100 species of flowering plants were described.

== Honours ==
=== Honorary degree ===
In 1936 the Utrecht University on the nomination by the Utrecht Professors Victor Jacob Koningsberger (1895–1966) and August Adriaan Pulle (1878–1955) at the event of the 300th anniversary conferred on him the honorary degree of Doctor of Science because of his botanical achievements.

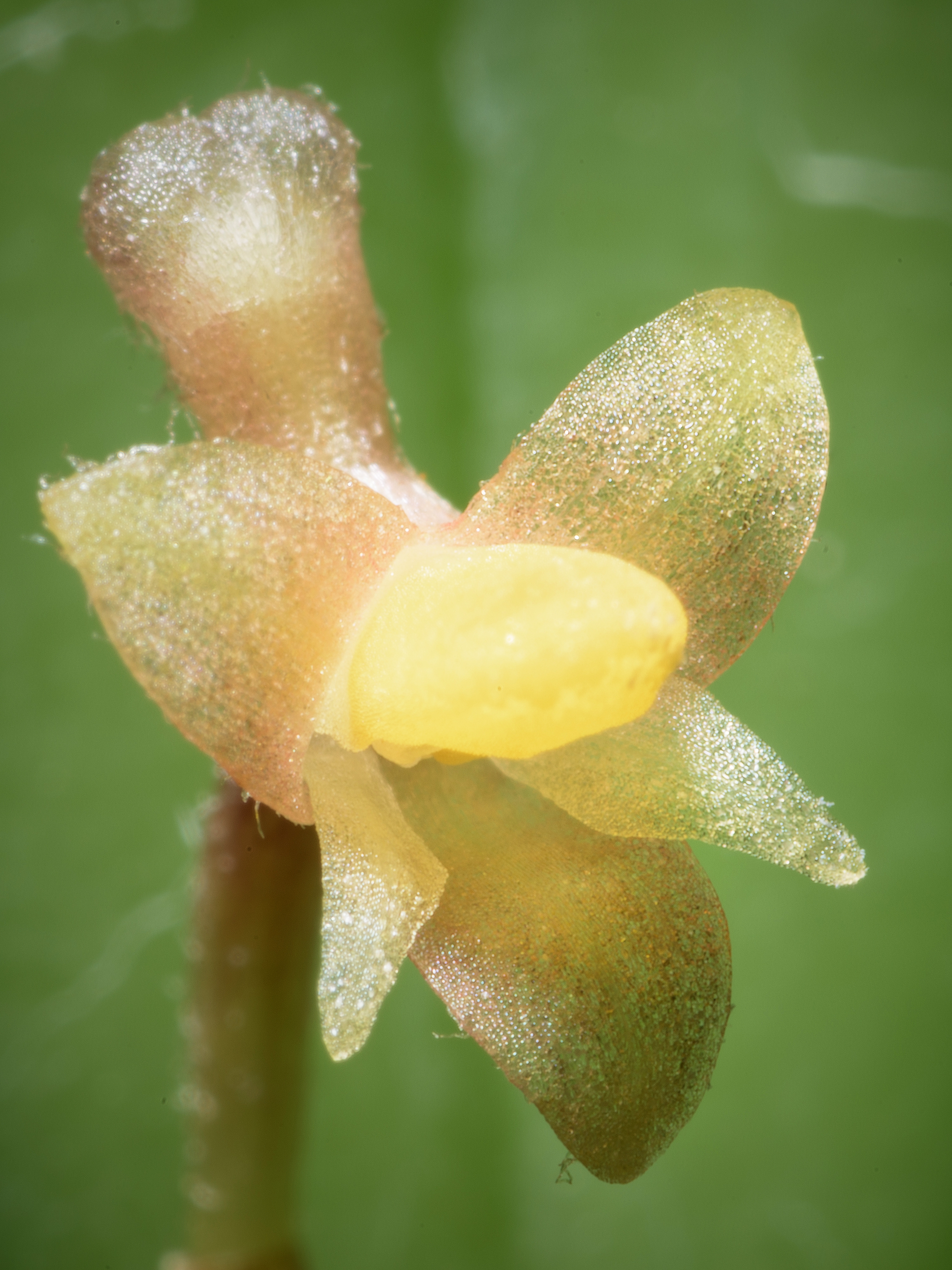
Orchid Ceratostylis backeri. Habitat: Central and West Java – at elevations of 1500 to 2500 m – grows as epiphyte on small trees.

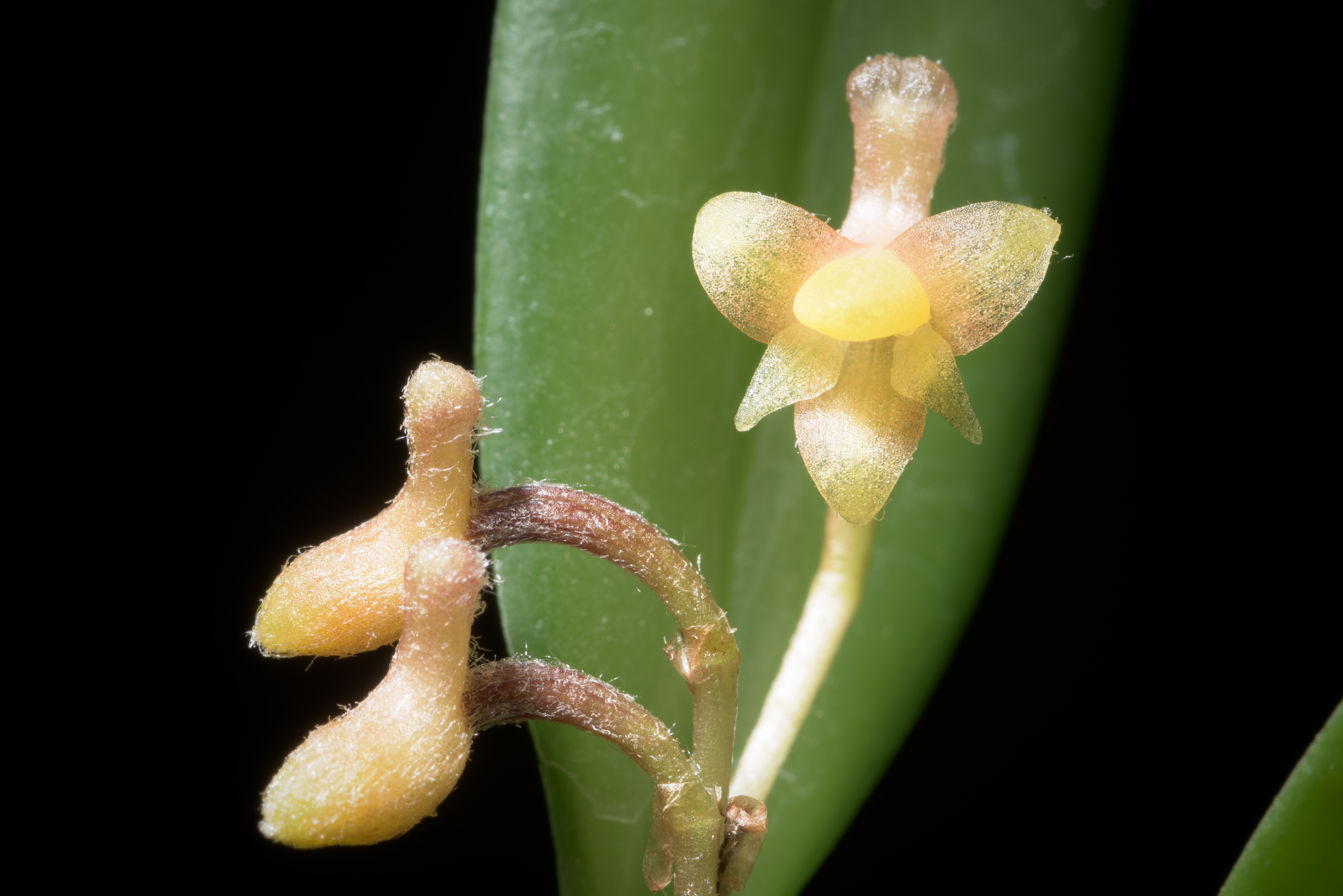
Ceratostylis backeri

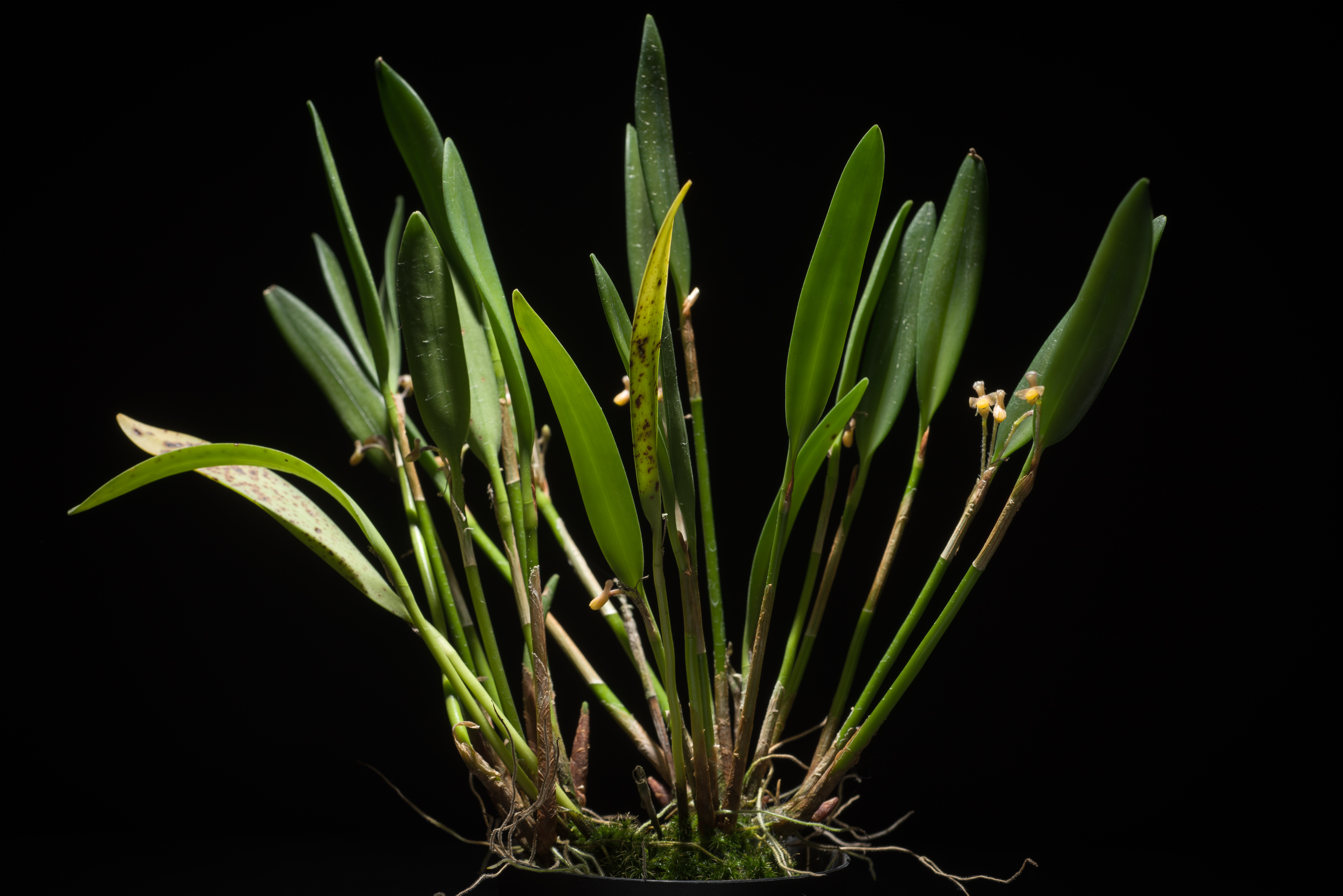
Ceratostylis backeri

=== Plants named after Backer ===
The genus Backeria (Melastomataceae) was named after Backer in 1943 by Reinier Cornelis Bakhuizen van den Brink Jr.

The following species have been named after Backer through the specific name backeri:

- Ceratostylis backeri — Johannes Jacobus Smith 1913
- Dryopteris backeri — Cornelis Rugier Willem Karel van Alderwerelt van Rosenburgh 1908
- Elatostema backeri — Hilde Schröter 1936
- Euphorbia backeri — Ferdinand Albin Pax & Käthe Hoffmann 1938
- Fagara backeri — Reinier Cornelis Bakhuizen van den Brink Jr. 1950 (at present Zanthoxylum backeri — Thomas Gordon Hartley 1966)
- Freycinetia backeri — Benjamin Clemens Masterman Stone 1971
- Habenaria backeri — Johannes Jacobus Smith 1914
- Ixora backeri — Cornelis Eliza Bertus Bremekamp 1937
- Lepidagathis backeri — Cornelis Eliza Bertus Bremekamp 1948
- Nasturtium backeri — Otto Eugen Schulz 1925 (at present Rorippa backeri — B. Jonsell 1979)
- Parastrobilanthes backeri — Cornelis Eliza Bertus Bremekamp 1944
- Pavetta backeri — Cornelis Eliza Bertus Bremekamp 1934
- Rostellularia backeri — Cornelis Eliza Bertus Bremekamp 1948
- Sterculia backeri — I. Gusti M. Tantra 1976

== Bibliography ==
- — (1907). Flora van Batavia: Dicotyledones dialypetalae (Thalamiflorae en Disciflorae) (in Dutch). G. Kolff.
- 1908: Voorlooper eener schoolflora voor Java, Batavia, Departement van Landbouw, G. Kolff.
- 1909: De flora van het eiland Krakatau. In: De opneming van de Krakatau-Groep in Mei 1908. Jaarverslag van den Topographischen dienst in Nederlandsch-Indie over 1908. 4:189–191.
- 1911: Schoolflora voor Java (medeauteur: Dirk Fok van Slooten), Weltevreden, Visser & Co.
- 1912: Aanteekenboekje voor het plantkundig onderwijs in de lagere klassen van middelbare scholen (medeauteur: A.J. Koens), Weltevreden, Visser & Co.
- 1912: Sawah planten, De Tropische Natuur 1: 129–135.
- 1913: Kritiek op de Exkursionsflora von Java (bearbetet von Dr. S.H. Koorders), Weltevreden, Visser & Co.
- 1913: Sawah planten, De Tropische Natuur 2: 74–76, 81–85, 118–122, 132–133.
- 1914: Sawah planten, De Tropische Natuur 3: 55–62.
- 1917–1922: Indische duinplanten, De Tropische Natuur 6: 73–78, 89–92, 97–100, 145–147; 7: 5-11, 55–59; 8: 6–10; 9: 173–191; 10: 12–17; 11: 131–140; 12: 17–22.
- —; D. F. van Slooten; Dutch East Indies. Procistation voor thee (1924). Geïllustreerd handboek der Javaansche theeonkruiden en hunne betekenis voor de cultuur (in Dutch). Ruygrok & Co.
- — (1928). Handboek voor de flora van Java (in Dutch). Drukkerijen Ruygrok & Company.
- 1928–1934: Onkruidflora der Javasche Suikerrietgronden, Pasoeroean, Proefstation voor de Java-Suikerindustrie.
- — (1929). The problem of Krakatao as seen by a botanist. Printed by H. Van Ingen.
- 1929: The problem of Krakatao as seen by a botanist, Weltevreden, Visser & Co., ’s-Gravenhage, Martinus Nijhoff.
- 1931: De vermeende sterilisatie van Krakatau in 1883, Vakblad voor Biologen XII: 157–162.
- 1936: Verklarend woordenboek der wetenschappelijke namen van de in Nederland en Nederlandsch Indië in het wild groeiende en in tuinen en parken gekweekte varens en hoogere planten, Groningen, P. Noordhoff N.V., Batavia, Noordhoff-Kolff.
- 1936: Verwideringscentra op Java van uitheemsche planten, De Tropische Natuur 25: 51–60.
- — (1939). Varenflora voor Java: overzicht der op Java voorkomende varens en varenachtigen, hare verspreiding, oekologie en toepassingen (in Dutch). 's Lands Plantentuin.
- — (1949). Dutch-English taxonomic-botanical vocabulary. Flora Malesiana.
- 1940–1948: Beknopte flora van Java (7 volumes), (emergency edition), Leiden, Rijksherbarium.
- 1951: Sonneratiaceae (co-author: Cornelis van Steenis, Flora Malesiana 74: 280–289.
- — (1968). Flora of Java. Bishen Singh Mahendra Pal Singh.
- 1963–1965–1968: Flora of Java (three volumes), (co-author: Reinier Cornelis Bakhuizen van den Brink Jr.), Groningen, Noordhoff.
- — (1973). Atlas of 220 Weeds of Sugar-cane Fields in Java. Ysel Press.
- 2000: Reprint. Verklarend woordenboek der wetenschappelijke namen van de in Nederland en Nederlandsch Indië in het wild groeiende en in tuinen en parken gekweekte varens en hoogere planten, Amsterdam/Antwerpen, L.J. Veen.
