= Isaac Henry Burkill =

British botanist

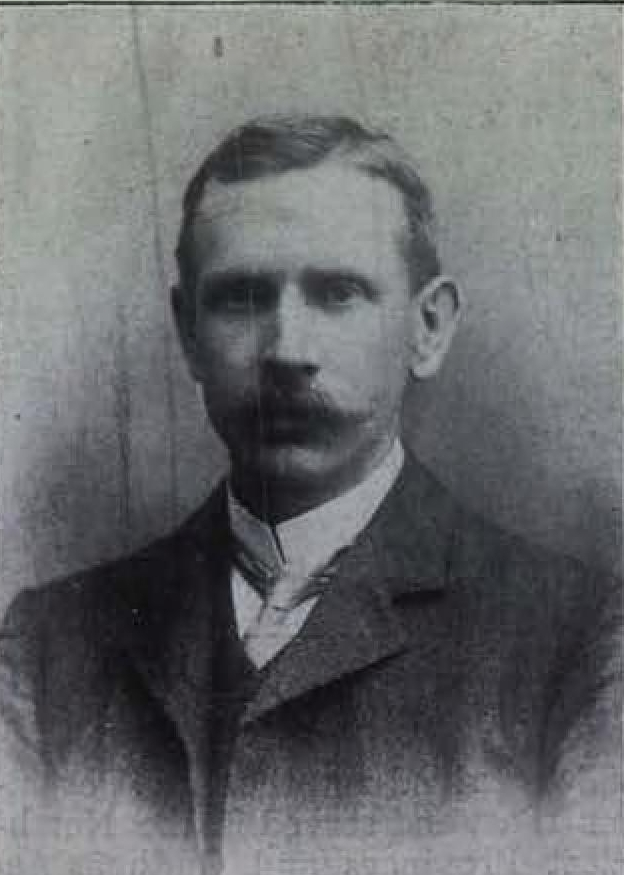
- c. 1907
- Born: 18 May 1870 near Leeds, Yorkshire, England
- Died: 8 March 1965 (aged 94); Leatherhead, Surrey, England
- Education: University of Cambridge
- Awards: Linnean Medal (1952)
- Scientific career
- Fields: Botany
- Workplaces: University of Cambridge; Royal Botanic Gardens, Kew; Botanic Garden at Calcutta; Botanic Gardens, Singapore
- Author abbrev. (botany): Burkill

Isaac Henry Burkill (18 May 1870 – 8 March 1965) was an English botanist who worked in India and in the Straits Settlements (present day Singapore). He worked primarily in economic botany but published extensively on plant biology, ethno-botany, insect-plant interactions and described several species. He published a two volume compilation on the plants of economic importance in the Malay Peninsula, collating local names and knowledge. He also wrote a detailed history of botany in India. The plant genera Burkillia and Burkillianthus were named in his honour.

== Life and career ==
Burkill was born in Chapel Allerton, Leeds, Yorkshire, he studied at Repton School and received a B.A. with Honours in Natural Science from Caius College, Cambridge winning the Frank Smart Prize. He then joined the University Herbarium at Cambridge as Curator from 1891 to 1896 during which time he obtained a master's degree receiving a Walsingham medal in 1894. In 1897 he joined the Royal Botanic Gardens, Kew as a Herbarium assistant and became a principal assistant in 1899. In 1901 he moved to India as an Assistant Reporter on Economic Products to the Government of India. He worked at the Indian Museum in Calcutta under Sir George Watt who was the Reporter. In 1911-12 he joined as botanist on the Abor Expedition. In 1912 he succeeded H. N. Ridley as Director of the Botanic Gardens, Singapore. He continued the work of his predecessor on the para-rubber and other aspects of economic botany but also reorganized the herbarium, collected specimens from across the region and worked intensively on vernacular names and local knowledge on medicinal plants. In 1935, ten years after his retirement, he published his two-volume Dictionary of economic products of Malay Peninsula which has been reprinted many times. Burkill also collected and compiled information on the collectors of specimens in the region. Burkill also worked in collaboration with the forestry department, conducting research on dipterocarps.

Burkill married his cousin Ethel Maud Morrison in 1910. Their son, Humphrey Morrison Burkill, was also a distinguished botanist who served as director of the Singapore Botanic Gardens from 1957 to 1969.

== Botanical publications ==
Burkill conducted research on insect pollination and floral biology over the course of many years. He published a series of eight articles in the Journal of the Asiatic Society of Bengal from 1906 to 1916. He also encouraged other researchers in the region to study pollination including amateur botanists like Maude Lina West Cleghorn. Burkill applied evolutionary ideas to suggest values of adaptations. In his 1908 study of flowers along a ridge in the Sikkim Himalayas, he suggested that the preponderance of pendulous flowers in the region were an adaptation to protect the nectar and pollen from rain and in his 1952 Hooker lecture he suggested that yams had evolved underground storages to protect themselves from pigs and humans.

- Burkill, I.H. (1906). "Note on the pollination of flowers in India. Note no 1. The pollination of Thunbergia grandiflora, Roxb. in Calcutta". Journal of the Asiatic Society of Bengal. 2 (10): 511–514.
- Burkill, I.H. (1906). "Notes on the pollinatio of flowers in India. Note no 2. The pollination of Corchorus in Bengal and Assam". Journal of the Asiatic Society of Bengal. 2 (10): 515–520.
- Burkill, I.H. (1906). "Notes on the pollination of flowers in India. Note no. 3. The mechanism of six flowers of the North-West Himalaya". Journal of the Asiatic Society of Bengal. 2 (10): 521–525.
- Burkill, I.H. (1907). "Notes on the pollination of flowers in India. Note no 4. On Cotton in Behar". Journal of the Asiatic Society of Bengal. 3 (7): 517–526.
- Burkill, I.H. (1908). "Notes on the pollination of flowers in India. Note no 5. Some autumn observations in the Sikkim Himalayas". Journal of the Asiatic Society of Bengal. 4: 179–195.
- Burkill, I.H. (1910). "Notes on the pollination of flowers in India. Note no 7. A few observations made in the Central Provinces and Behar". Journal of the Asiatic Society of Bengal. 6: 101–107.
- Burkill, I.H. (1916). "Notes on the pollination of flowers in India. Note no. 8. Miscellanea". Journal of the Asiatic Society of Bengal. 12: 239–265.

Burkill also wrote a seven part series on the history of botany in India, published initially in the Journal of the Bombay Natural History Society and later as a separate book. This work covered the range of botanical workers in India and is an important source on the topic although there were some minor errors such as a mention of "Dapoli" in place of "Dapuri". Burkill similarly wrote a study on the history of the Singapore botanic garden.

- Burkill, I.H. (1954). "Chapters on the history of botany in India. I. From the beginning to the middle of Wallich's service". Journal of the Bombay Natural History Society. 51: 846–878.
- Burkill, I.H. (1956). "Chapters on the history of botany in India. II. The advances, and in particular the plant collecting, of the thirties and the forties of the 19th century". Journal of the Bombay Natural History Society. 54: 42–86.
- Burkill, I.H. (1961). "Chapters on the History of Botany in India. III. At the middle of the 19th century". Journal of the Bombay Natural History Society. 58 (3): 678–706.
- Burkill, I.H. (1962). "Chapters on the History of Botany in India. IV. The Royal Gardens at Kew begin to guide the direction of Botany in India". Journal of the Bombay Natural History Society. 59 (2): 335–359.
- Burkill, I.H. (1962). "Chapters on the history of botany in India V. The undertaking of two great enterprises, the flora of the higher plants and the forest service". Journal of the Bombay Natural History Society. 59 (3): 747–777.
- Burkill, I.H. (1963). "Chapters on the history of botany in India. VI. The publication of Hooker's Flora of British India and what its publication released". Journal of the Bombay Natural History Society. 60 (1): 49–83.
- Burkill, I.H. (1963). "Chapters on the history of botany in India. VII. Epilogue". Journal of the Bombay Natural History Society. 60 (2): 356–370.

== Awards and Distinctions ==
- Honorary Fellow of the Association for Tropical Biology (and Conservation) 1963.
- Linnean Medal in 1952.
