= Tacca ampliplacenta =

Scientific classification
- Kingdom: Plantae
- Clade: Tracheophytes
- Clade: Angiosperms
- Clade: Monocots
- Order: Dioscoreales
- Family: Dioscoreaceae
- Genus: Tacca
- Species: T. ampliplacenta

Binomial name
- Tacca ampliplacenta L.Zhang & Q.J.Li

Species of flowering plant

Tacca ampliplacenta is a species of flowering plant in the yam family Dioscoreaceae, which is endemic to Yunnan, China. It was discovered Yunnan, China.

It was first described in 2008 by Ling Zhang and Qing-Jun Li.

== Description ==
T. ampliplacenta is a perennial herb with a cylindrical rhizome. It has mauve leaves at the apex.

T. ampliplacenta differs from T. integrifolia by having involucral bracts which are roughly decussate and having the two inner bracts ovate oblong whereas T. integrifolia's innermost bracts resemble rabbits' ears. It differs from T.chantrieri by having the seeds tightly connected to the flesh and difficult to separate from the flesh. There are five to ten radical pinnately nerved leaves. The red-wine coloured flower stalks are axillary. The inflorescence is an umbel with up to 25 flowers, which have four involucral bracts. The flowers are triangular and greenish purple when young. The buds are a black-purple. There are three petal like stigmas.

It flowers from early July to late August and fruits the following year from June to July.

== Distribution ==
It is found from the south west to the west of Yunnan Province in dense dank forest.
