= Black Bat =

Black Bat may refer to:

- Black Bat (Amalgam Comics), an Amalgam Comics character
- Black Bat (pulp fiction character), multiple characters from pulp magazines
- Black Bat Squadron, a Chinese reconnaissance squadron
- Cassandra Cain, a DC Comics character also known as Black Bat
- Tacca chantrieri, a species of flower known as black bat flower
