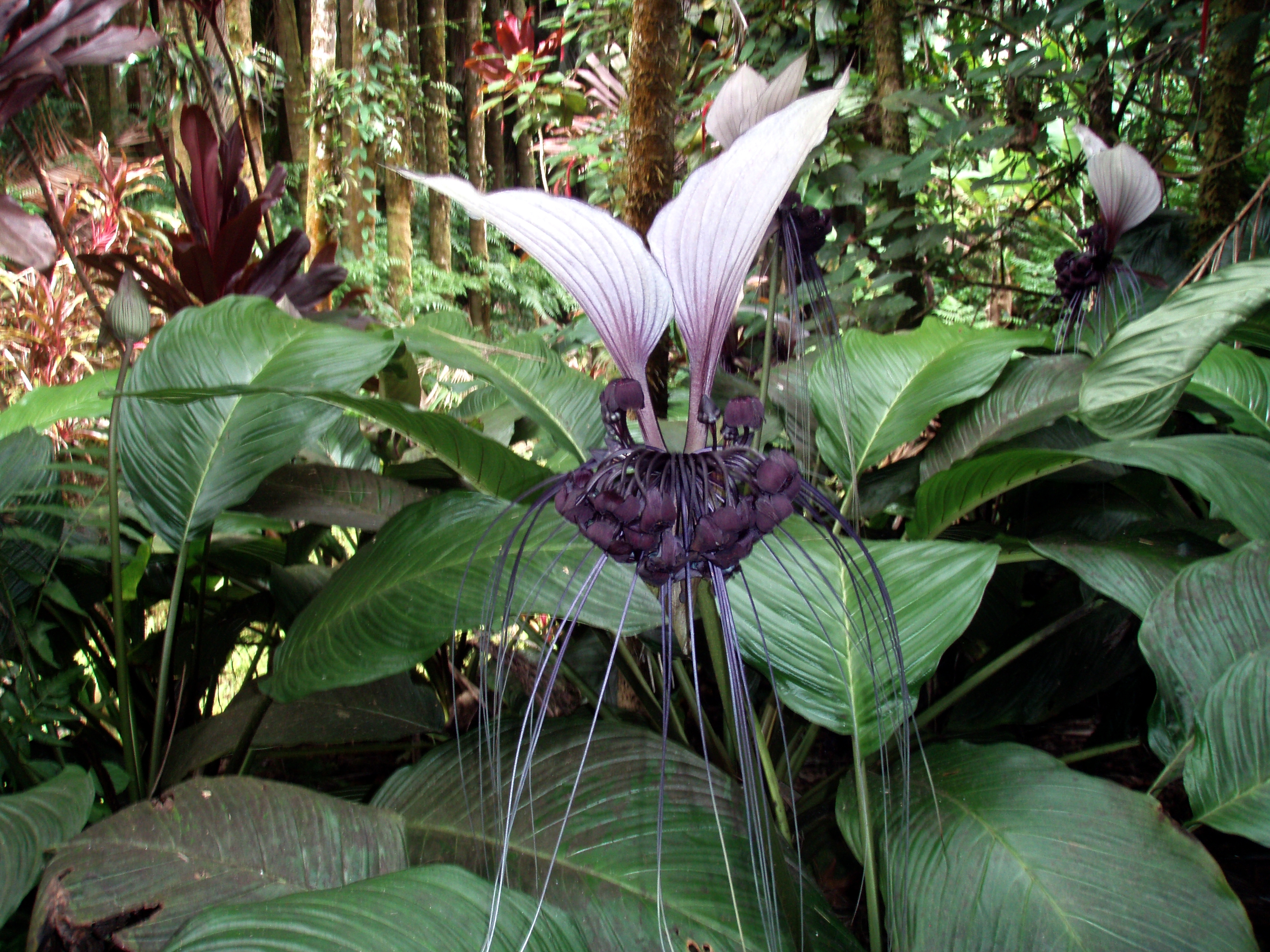
- White Bat Flower (Tacca integrifolia)

Scientific classification
- Kingdom: Plantae
- Clade: Embryophytes
- Clade: Tracheophytes
- Clade: Spermatophytes
- Clade: Angiosperms
- Clade: Monocots
- Order: Dioscoreales
- Family: Dioscoreaceae
- Genus: Tacca; J.R.Forst. & G.Forst.

Synonyms
- Leontopetaloides Boehm; Ataccia C.Presl; Chaitaea Sol. ex Seem.; Schizocapsa Hance

= Tacca =

Bat flowers

Genus of flowering plants

The genus Tacca, which includes the batflowers and arrowroot, consists of flowering plants in the order Dioscoreales, native to tropical regions of South America, Africa, Australia, Southeast Asia, and various Oceanic islands. In older texts, the genus was treated in its own family Taccaceae, but the 2003 APG II system incorporates it into the family Dioscoreaceae. The APG III and APG IV systems continue to include Tacca in Dioscoreaceae.

== Description ==
Many Tacca species have nearly black flowers, with conspicuous involucral bracts and bracteoles like whiskers. Engbert Drenth hypothesized that species of this genus attracted "carrion and dung flies" for pollination and that the fleshy seam of the seed might be attractive to ants and hence that ants might aid in seed dispersal.

== Taxonomy ==
Earlier classifications placed the genus within the monogeneric family Taccaceae, which in turn was the sole family in the order Taccales. Dahlgren recognised the similarities to the genera within the Dioscoreales, and incorporated the family into that order.

=== Subdivision ===
There are at least 16 species,

- Tacca ampliplacenta L.Zhang & Q.J.Li - Yunnan
- Tacca ankaranensis Bard.-Vauc., 1997 - Madagascar
- Tacca bibracteata Drenth - Sarawak
- Tacca borneensis Ridl. - Borneo
- Tacca celebica Koord. - Sulawesi
- Tacca chantrieri André, 1901 - Indochina, Assam, Bangladesh, Tibet, Guangdong, Guangxi, Guizhou, Hainan, Hunan, Yunnan
- Tacca ebeltajae Drenth - Papua New Guinea, Solomon Islands
- Tacca integrifolia Ker Gawl., 1812 - Tibet, Bhutan, Assam, Bangladesh, Indochina, India, Pakistan, Java, Malaysia, Sumatra, Borneo
- Tacca leontopetaloides (L.) Kuntze, 1891 - widespread across tropical Africa, Madagascar, Indian Subcontinent, Southeast Asia, New Guinea, Australia, and various islands of the Indian and Pacific Oceans
- Tacca maculata Seem., 1866 - Western Australia, Northern Territory, Fiji, Samoa
- Tacca palmata Blume - Indonesia, Indochina, Malaysia, Philippines, New Guinea
- Tacca palmatifida Baker - Sulawesi
- Tacca parkeri Seem. - South America
- Tacca plantaginea (Hance) Drenth, 1972 - Indochina, southern China
- Tacca reducta P.C.Boyce & S.Julia - Sarawak, Borneo, Malesia
- Tacca subflabellata P.P. Ling & C.T. Ting, 1982 - Yunnan

Synonyms:

- Tacca lanceolata Spruce - Brazil, Venezuela = Tacca parkeri Seem.

== Cultivation ==
Several species are cultivated as ornamental plants for their bold foliage and large flowers. The well-known T. chantrieri goes by the names of black batflower, bat-head lily, devil flower or cat's whiskers. Tacca integrifolia is known as the purple or white batflower. Other cultivated varieties include the arrowroot, T. leontopetaloides, and T. cristata aspera.

== Gallery ==
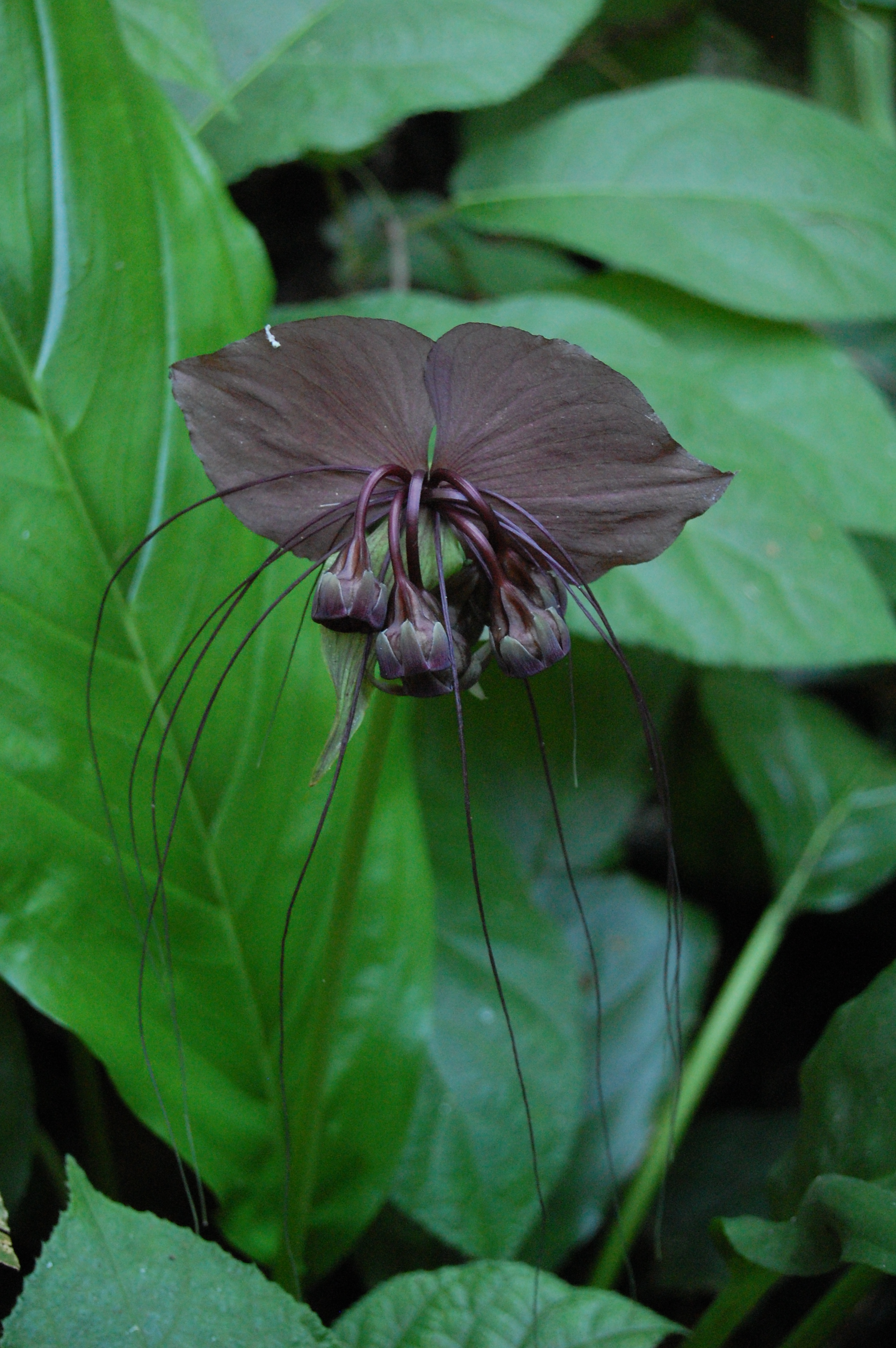
Black bat flower, Tacca chantrieri, close-up of flower

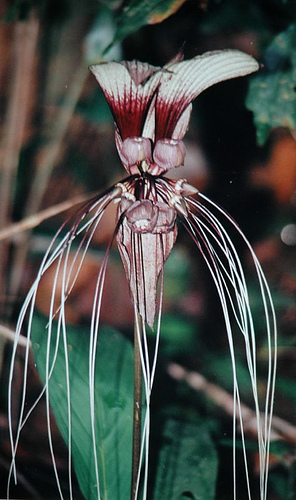
Tacca cristata, flowering

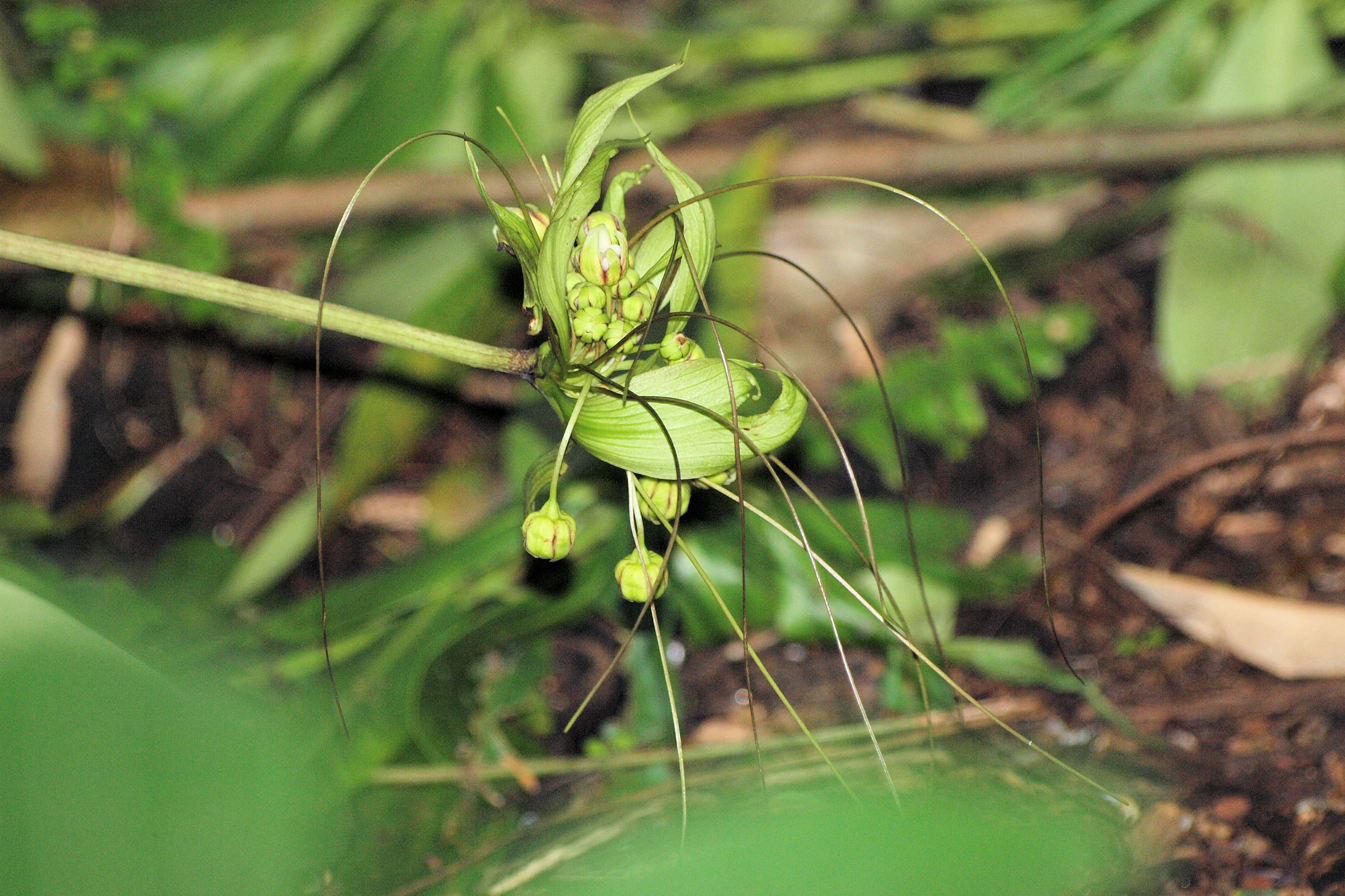
Ankarana arrowroot, Tacca ankaranensis, flower

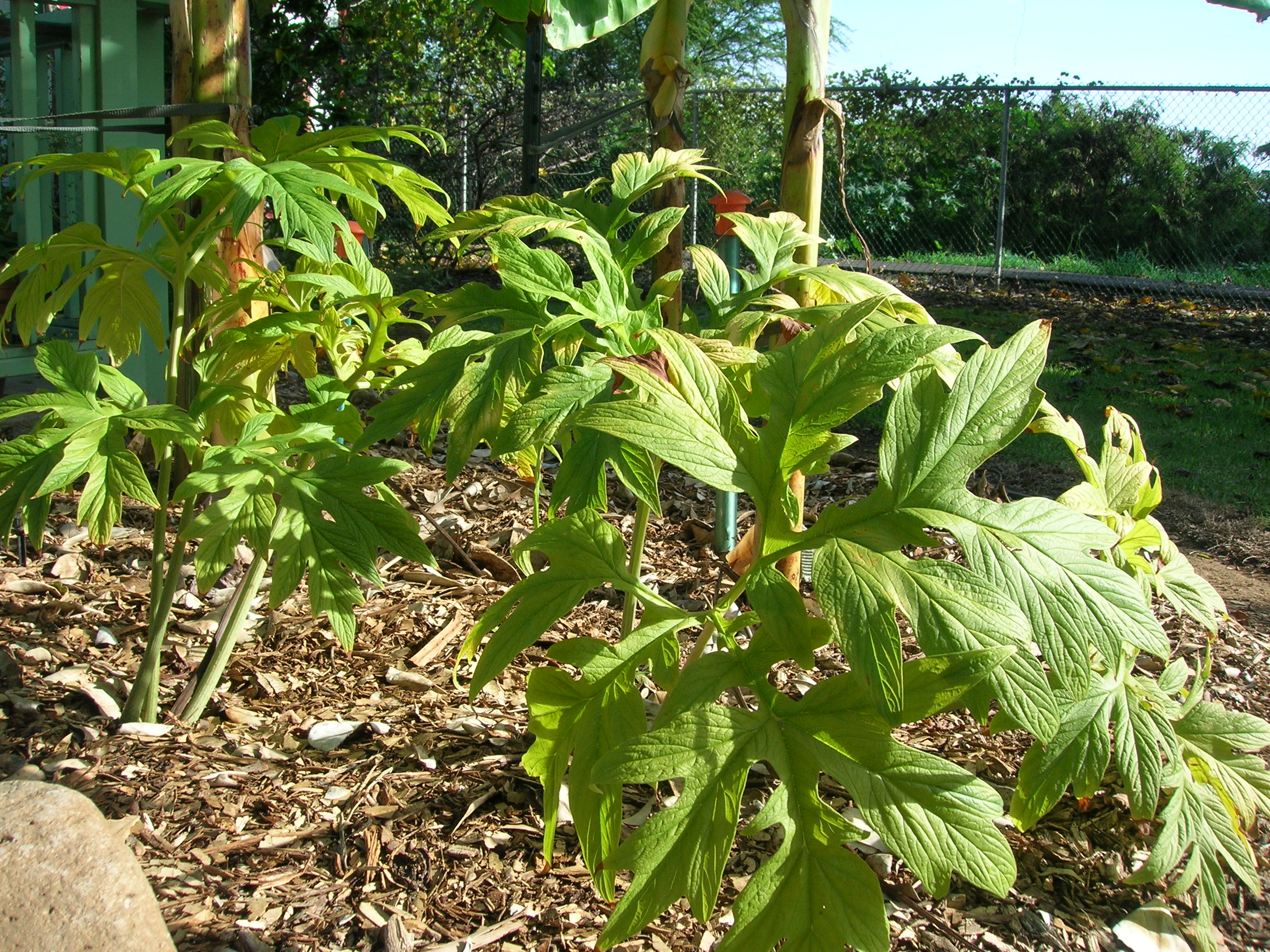
Polynesian arrowroot, Tacca leontopetaloides, mature plants

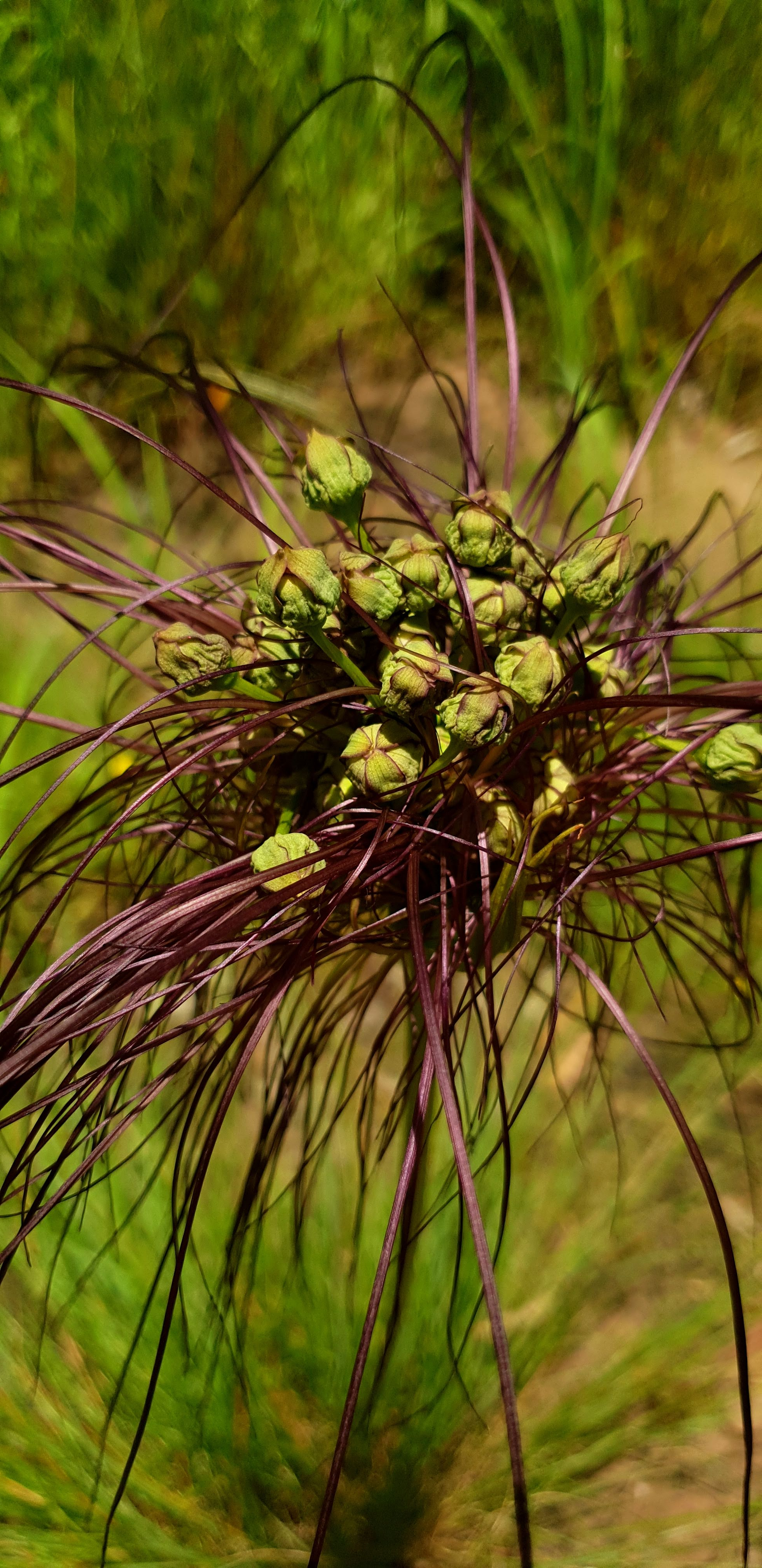
Tacca maculata Mirima National Park

== Bibliography ==
- Dahlgren, Rolf; Clifford, H. T. (1982). The monocotyledons: A comparative study. London and New York: Academic Press.
- Germplasm Resources Information Network: Tacca
- Taccaceae in L. Watson and M.J. Dallwitz (1992 onwards), The families of flowering plants Archived 2007-01-03 at the Wayback Machine
- Huxley, A., ed. (1992). New RHS Dictionary of Gardening. Macmillan.
