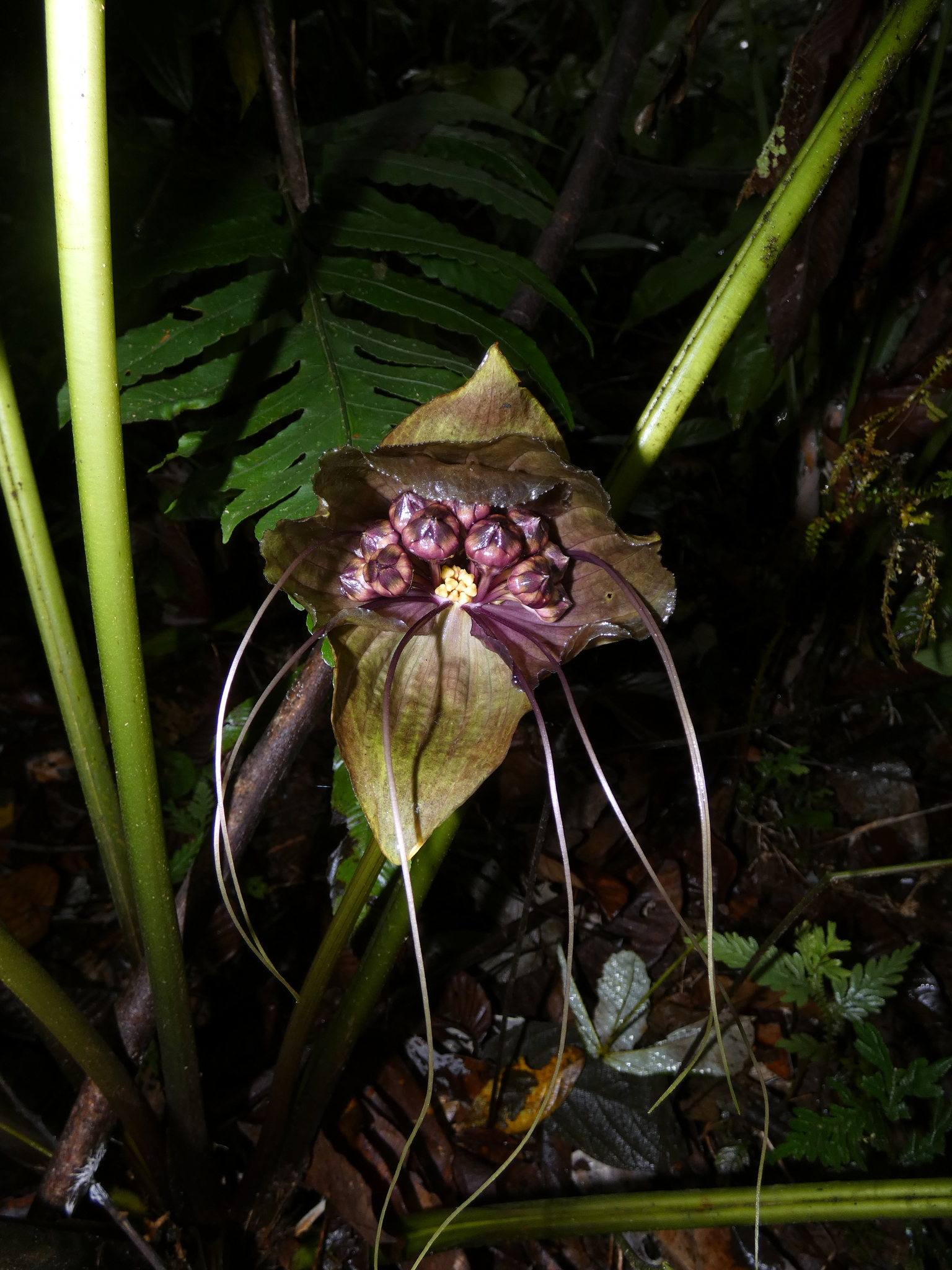

Scientific classification
- Kingdom: Plantae
- Clade: Tracheophytes
- Clade: Angiosperms
- Clade: Monocots
- Order: Dioscoreales
- Family: Dioscoreaceae
- Genus: Tacca
- Species: T. borneensis

Binomial name
- Tacca borneensis Ridl.

= Tacca borneensis =

Species of plant

Tacca borneensis is a plant in the Dioscoreaceae family, native to west Borneo.

It was first described by Henry Nicholas Ridley in 1908.

== Description ==
Ridley describes the plant as:

A large tufted plant with the habit of T. cristata. Leaves ovate acuminate, petiole 6 inches or more long, blade 24 inches long, 9 inches across glabrous nerves about 9 pairs primary distant ascending one intramarginal running to the tip, margin undulate. Scape stout 6 inches long. Involucral bracts 4, subequal and similar, ovate sessile obtuse opposite pubescent on the back 2½ inches long l½ inch wide, the two inner ones shortly petioled. Filamentous bracts rather short. Flowers smaller than those of T. cristata purple. Sepals oblong slightly narrowed at the base apex rounded. Petals ovate acute mucronate, ¼ inch long. Stamens, with very short but distinct filament, anthers ovate base retuse, stigma, too-much crushed. Ovary and pedicel ½ inch.

Borneo : Sarawak on Matang, (Ridley.)
The broad ovate leaves of this plant would be quite sufficient to distinguish it from T. cristata. The involucral bracts too are very distinct, the outer ones broadly ovate, the inner ones narrowed slightly at the base, and all minutely and scantily pubescent. The flowers are smaller and the stamens more distinctly stalked.
