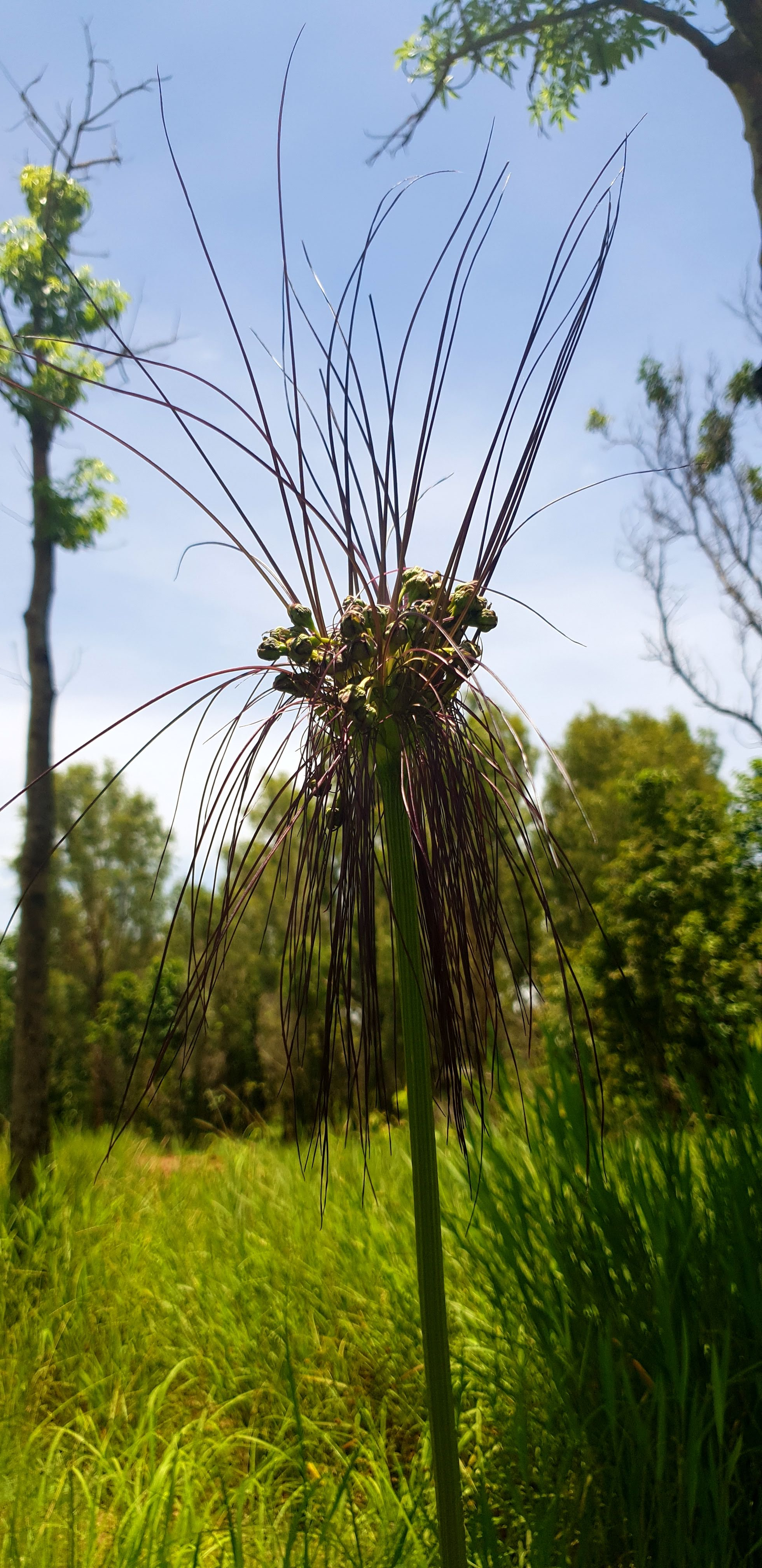
- in Mirima National Park

Scientific classification
- Kingdom: Plantae
- Clade: Tracheophytes
- Clade: Angiosperms
- Clade: Monocots
- Order: Dioscoreales
- Family: Dioscoreaceae
- Genus: Tacca
- Species: T. maculata

Binomial name
- Tacca maculata Seem.

= Tacca maculata =

Species of plant

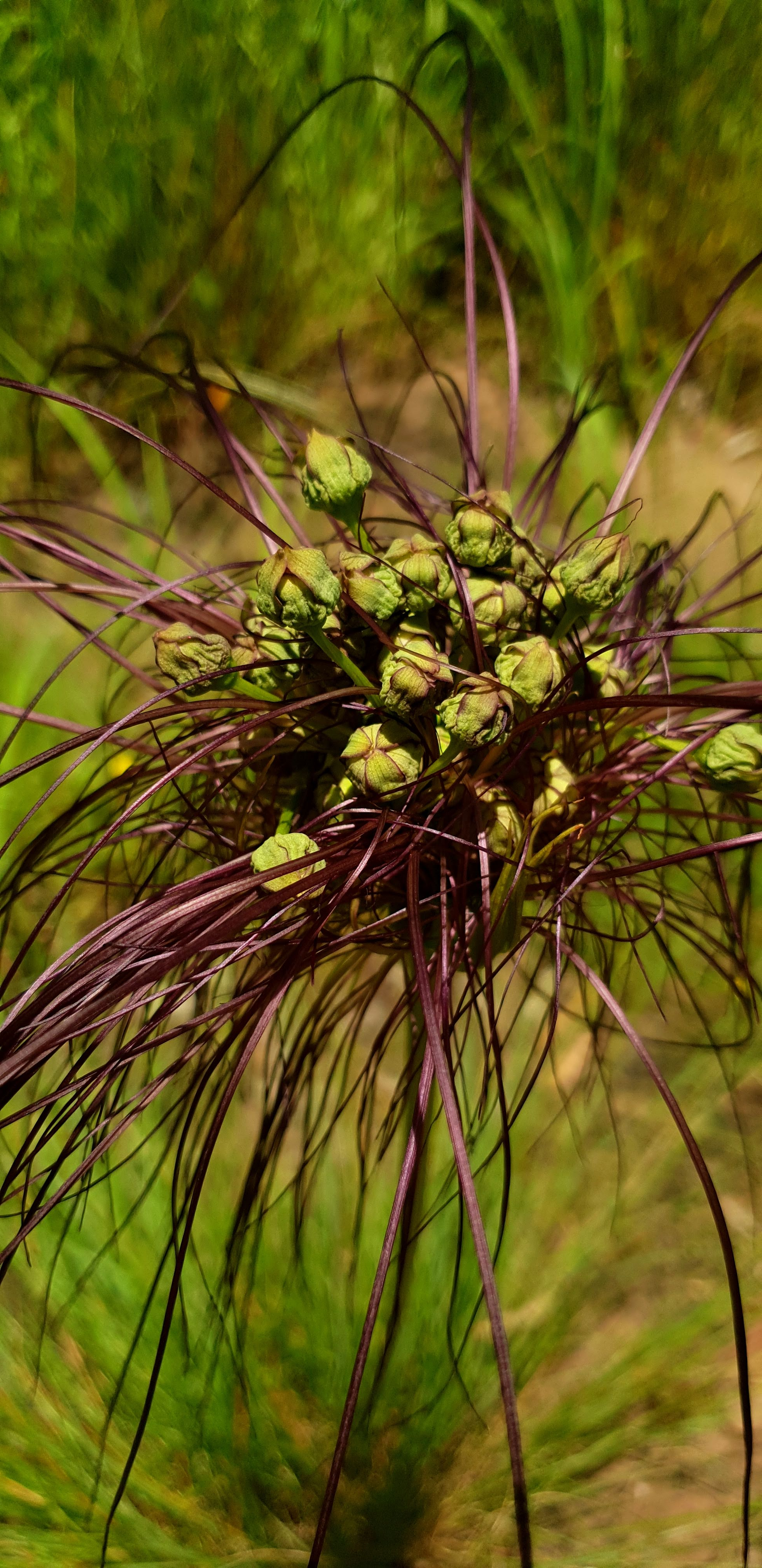
Mirima National Park

Tacca maculata is a plant in the Dioscoreaceae family, native to Western Australia, the Northern Territory, Fiji and Samoa

It was first described by Berthold Carl Seemann in 1866.

== Description ==
Tacca maculata has few leaves on petioles up to 1.9 m long, and (usually greater than 1 m long). The leaf lamina start trisected but then become irregularly dissected. The scape of the inflorescence is up to 2 m long. There are three or four involucral bracts and they are lanceolate to ovate. There are 20 to 40 flowers on pedicels which are up to 5 cm long. The sepals and petals are similar, and green on the outside, maroon on the inside. The style is about 2 mm long and has three glandular patches at the base. The fruit is rounded and topped with a persistent perianth.

== Habitat ==
T. maculata usually grows in well-drained lateritic soils.
