= Taccalonolide =

Class of chemical compounds

Chemical structure of taccalonolide A

Taccalonolides are a class of microtubule-stabilizing agents isolated from Tacca chantrieri that has been shown to have selective cancer-fighting properties. Other examples of microtubule-stabilizing agents include taxanes and epothilones, both of which prevent cancer cells from dividing by interfering with tubulin. While taxanes like paclitaxel and docetaxel have been used successfully against breast, ovarian, prostate, and non–small-cell lung cancers, intrinsic and acquired drug resistance limit their anticancer properties. Unlike taxanes, taccalonolides appear to work through a different mechanism of action that does not involve tubulin, although recently isolated taccalonolides AF and AJ have shown tubulin-interaction activity. The discovery of taccalonolides opens up new possibilities to treat cancer cells, especially ones that are taxane- or epithilone-resistant.

== Discovery ==
The first taccalonolide was isolated in 1963 from the tubers of Tacca leontopetaloides when researchers were exploring the "bitter principle" of the plant. Named taccalin, the bitter, light yellow powder and its hypothesized properties would help build the infrastructure for the elucidation of the structure of taccaolonolides 24 years later.

The structures of taccalonolides A and B were elucidated in 1987 as a complex pentacyclic steroidal-like structure with the molecular formula of C_{36}H_{46}O_{14} and taccolonolide E was isolated in 1991. The most recent taccalonolides, AC-AF and H2, were elucidated using spectroscopic methods in 2011. Each taccalonolide contains a C2-C3 epoxide and all except taccalonolide C have a C23-C26 lactone ring.

Taccalonolides in the cancer-fighting context were discovered in a mechanism-based screening program designed to identify microtubule-disrupting agents from natural products. After a crude extract with Taxol-like microtubule binding properties was identified, bioassay-directed purification yielded taccalonolides E and A.

== Effects ==
Like other microtubule-stabilizing agents, taccalonolides induce the formation of abnormal mitotic spindles, leading to mitotic arrest, Bcl-2 phosphorylation, MAPK activation, nucleus breakdown, formation of micronuclei, and initiation of apoptosis.

== Mechanism in action ==
Unlike other microtubule-stabilizing agents, most taccalonolides do not bind to the taxane-binding site of tubulin. The exact mechanism of action has not yet been elucidated, although a recent study found that taccalonolides AF and AJ may interact directly with tubulin.

=== Role in cancer therapy ===
Microtubule-targeting agents have been used in an anti-cancer context for more than 50 years, from the clinical use of vinblastine in 1961. Recent studies show that taccalonolides have promise as a new and effective cancer-fighting agent to circumvent multiple drug resistance mechanisms. The potential advantages of taccalonolides include: 1) a novel structure, 2) a novel mechanism, 3) more persistent (less reversible) activity than other MT-stabilizers, and 4) concentrations effective in interphase and mitotic cells that are very similar.

=== In vitro ===
In vitro, taccalonolides are substantially less potent than taxanes. However, taccalonolides A, B, E, and N have shown cytotoxic potency in the high nanomolar range against cervical, ovarian, breast, and lung cancer cell lines. Because they do not bind directly to tubulin, taccalonolides have shown efficacy in cell lines and tumors with taxane-resistance mediated by overexpression of P-glycoprotein (Pgp) multidrug transporter or expression of class III β-tubulin. They have also shown efficacy against cells with expression of mutations in the paclitaxel binding site or expression of ABC transporter multidrug resistance protein 7 (MRP7) (which show resistance to epothilone B). A recent study showed that taccalonolide A and γ-radiation act in an additive manner to cause cell death.

=== In vivo ===
Taccalonolide A has been shown to more potent than paclitaxel in vivo, although the nature of the differences between in vitro and in vivo potency is not yet known. Taccalonolides A and E were potent against Pgp-expression Mam17/ADR synergeic cells in mouse models and were shown to be effective antitumor agents in doxorubicin and paclitaxel insensitive tumors.

== Future directions ==
Currently, complete chemical synthesis is not an option due to structural complexity. However, taccalonolide AJ was semisynthesized as an epoxidation product of taccalonolide B, suggesting that partial synthesis may be a possibility. Purification of taccalonolides from the roots and rhizomes of T.chantrieri plants is time-consuming and expensive.

A non-toxic, readily bioavailable formulation for taccalonolides is needed. The in vivo studies performed involved formulation with a solution moderately toxic to patients. One possibility is the encapsulation of a drug into a carrier molecule, which has been successfully done with several hydrophobic drugs, including paclitaxel.

Finally, it is imperative to elucidate the mechanism of action of taccalonides to further both drug development and identification of other molecules capable of producing taccalonolide-like effects.
