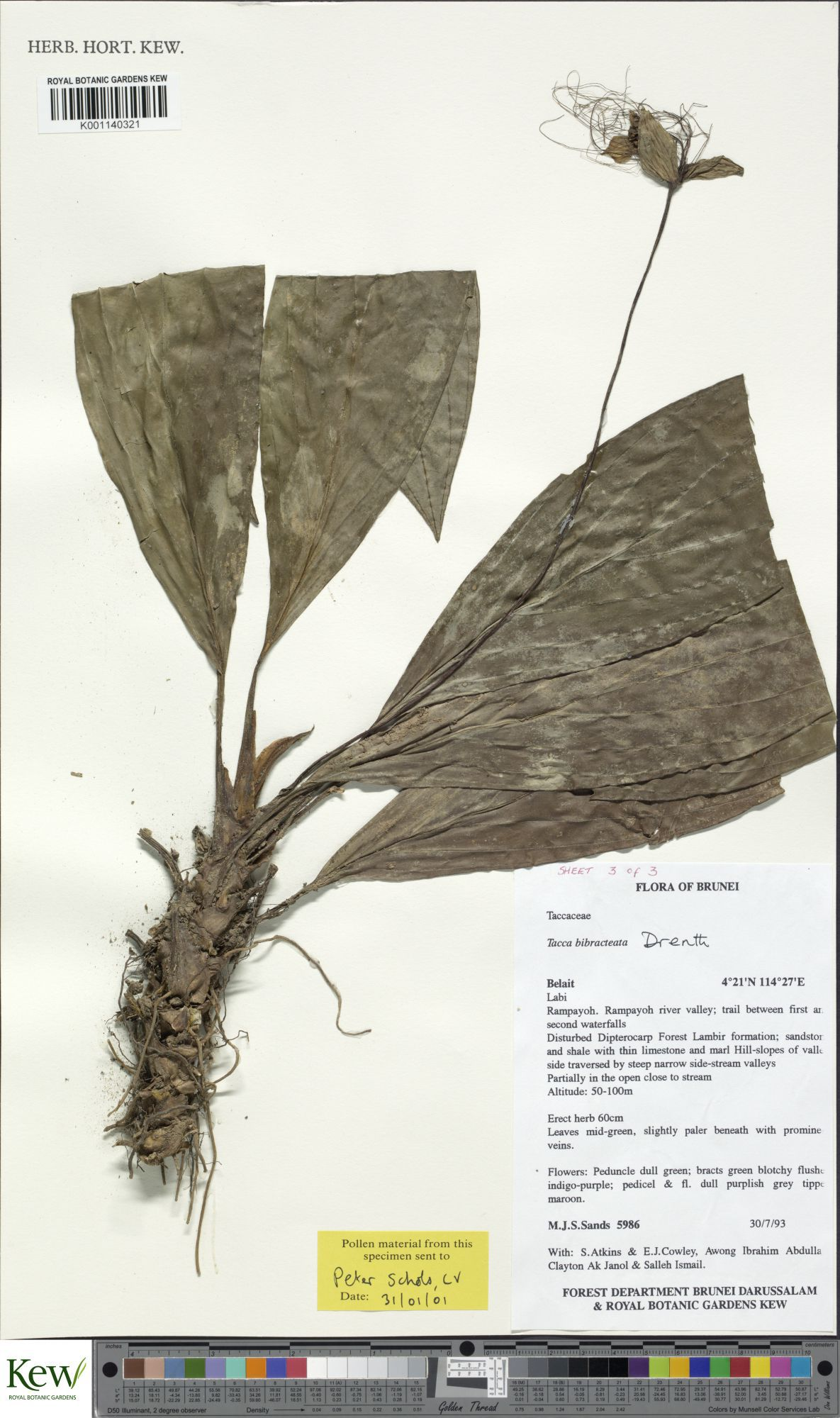

Scientific classification
- Kingdom: Plantae
- Clade: Tracheophytes
- Clade: Angiosperms
- Clade: Monocots
- Order: Dioscoreales
- Family: Dioscoreaceae
- Genus: Tacca
- Species: T. bibracteata

Binomial name
- Tacca bibracteata Drenth

= Tacca bibracteata =

Species of plant

Tacca bibracteata is a plant in the Dioscoreaceae family, native to Sarawak.

It was first described by Engbert Drenth in 1908.

== Description ==
Tacca bibracteata has 6-7 entire oblong leaves with attenuate bases and acuminate apices, and pinnate nerves. It has four to many filiform bracts, and just two involucral bracts, and it is this characteristic which gives the species epithet, bibracteata. The apparently solitary inflorescence has up to ten flowers which are green and tinged with violet or very dark purple.
