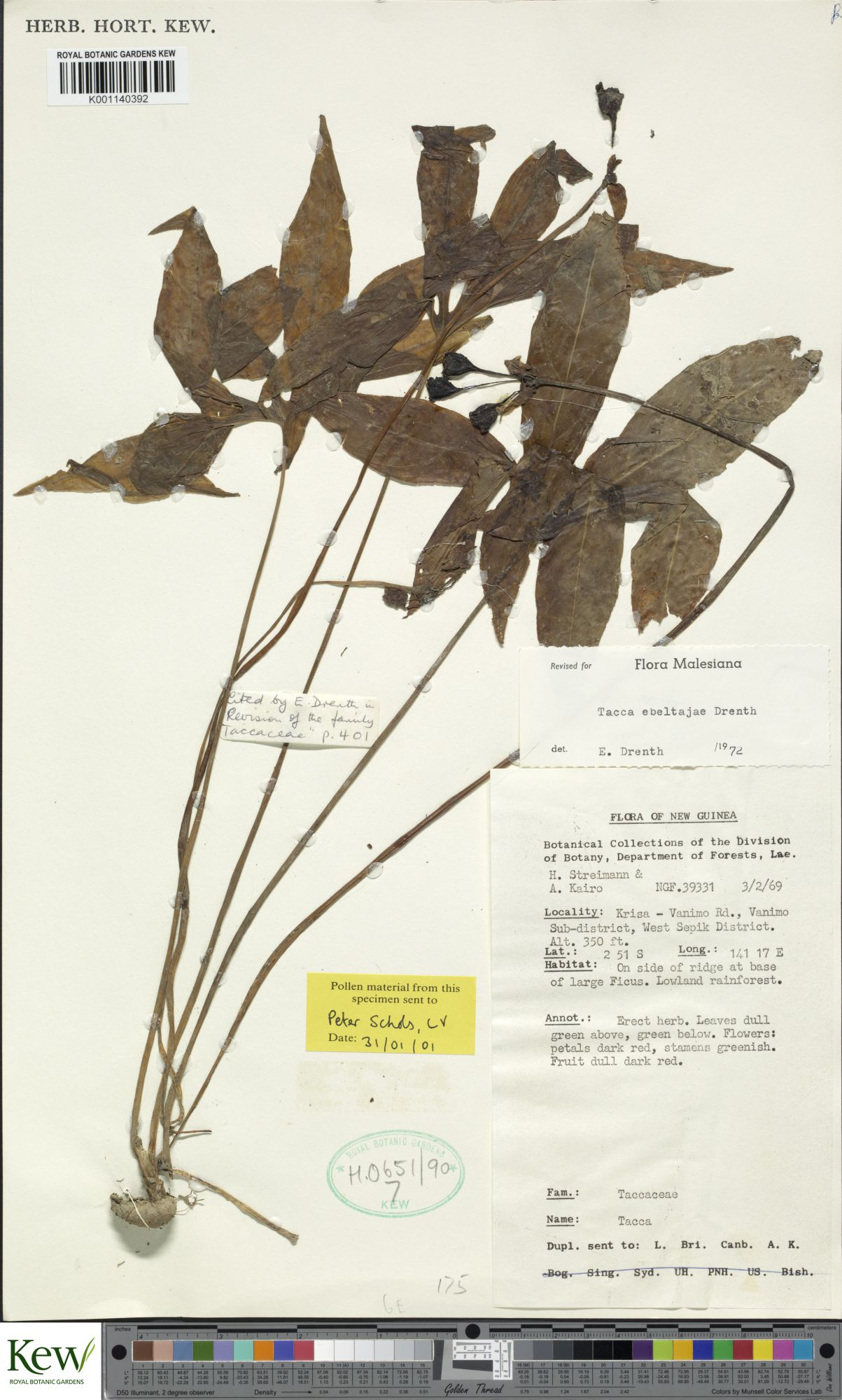

Scientific classification
- Kingdom: Plantae
- Clade: Tracheophytes
- Clade: Angiosperms
- Clade: Monocots
- Order: Dioscoreales
- Family: Dioscoreaceae
- Genus: Tacca
- Species: T. ebeltajae

Binomial name
- Tacca ebeltajae Drenth

= Tacca ebeltajae =

Species of plant

Tacca ebeltajae is a plant in the Dioscoreaceae family, native to New Guinea and the Solomon Islands.

It was first described by Engbert Drenth in 1973.
