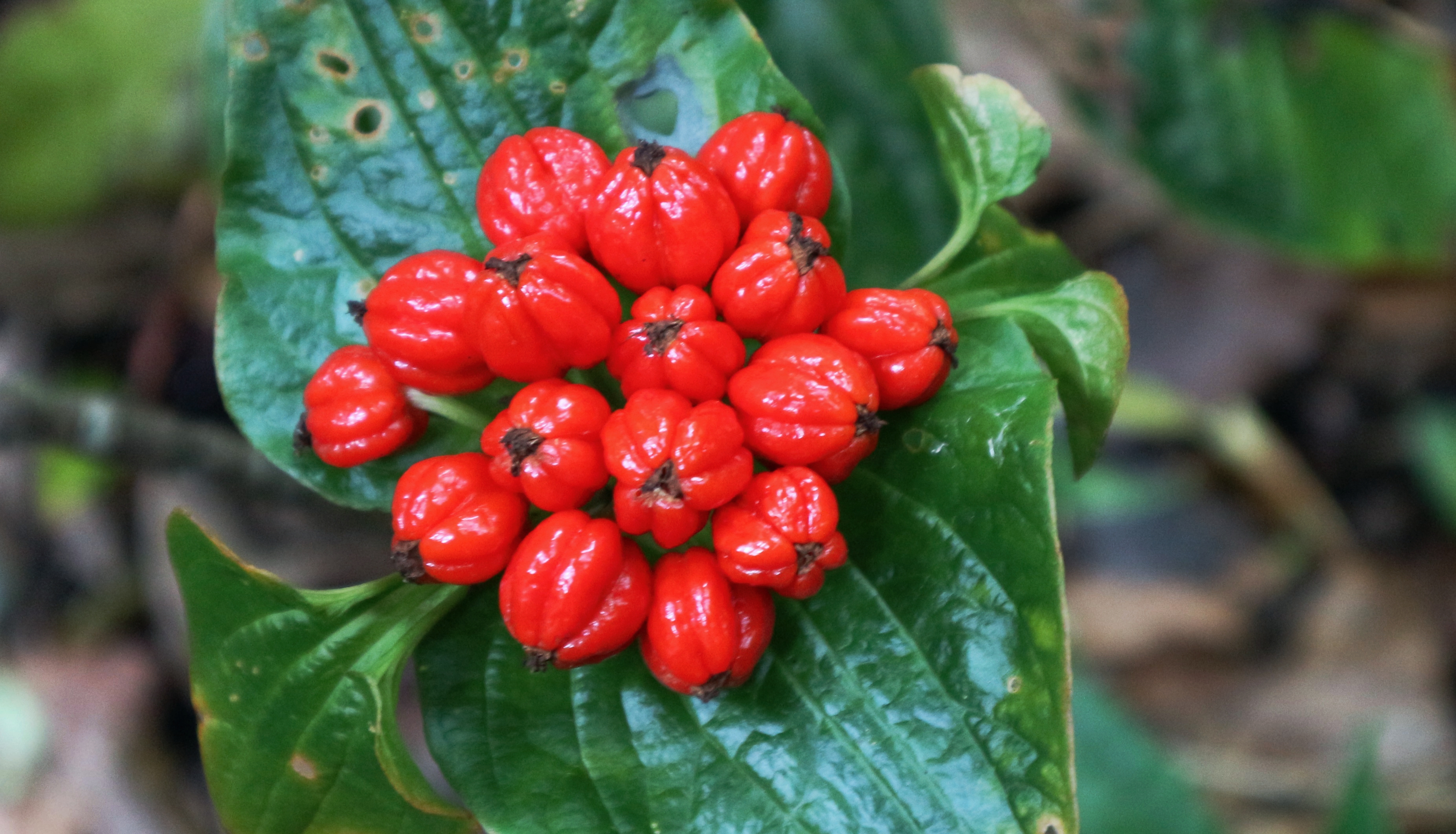

Scientific classification
- Kingdom: Plantae
- Clade: Tracheophytes
- Clade: Angiosperms
- Clade: Monocots
- Order: Dioscoreales
- Family: Dioscoreaceae
- Genus: Tacca
- Species: T. palmata

Binomial name
- Tacca palmata Blume

= Tacca palmata =

Species of plant

Tacca palmata is a plant in the Dioscoreaceae family, native to Borneo, Cambodia, Indonesia, Malaysia, New Guinea, Philippines, Sulawesi, Sumatra, Thailand, and Vietnam.

It was first described by Carl Ludwig Blume in 1827.
