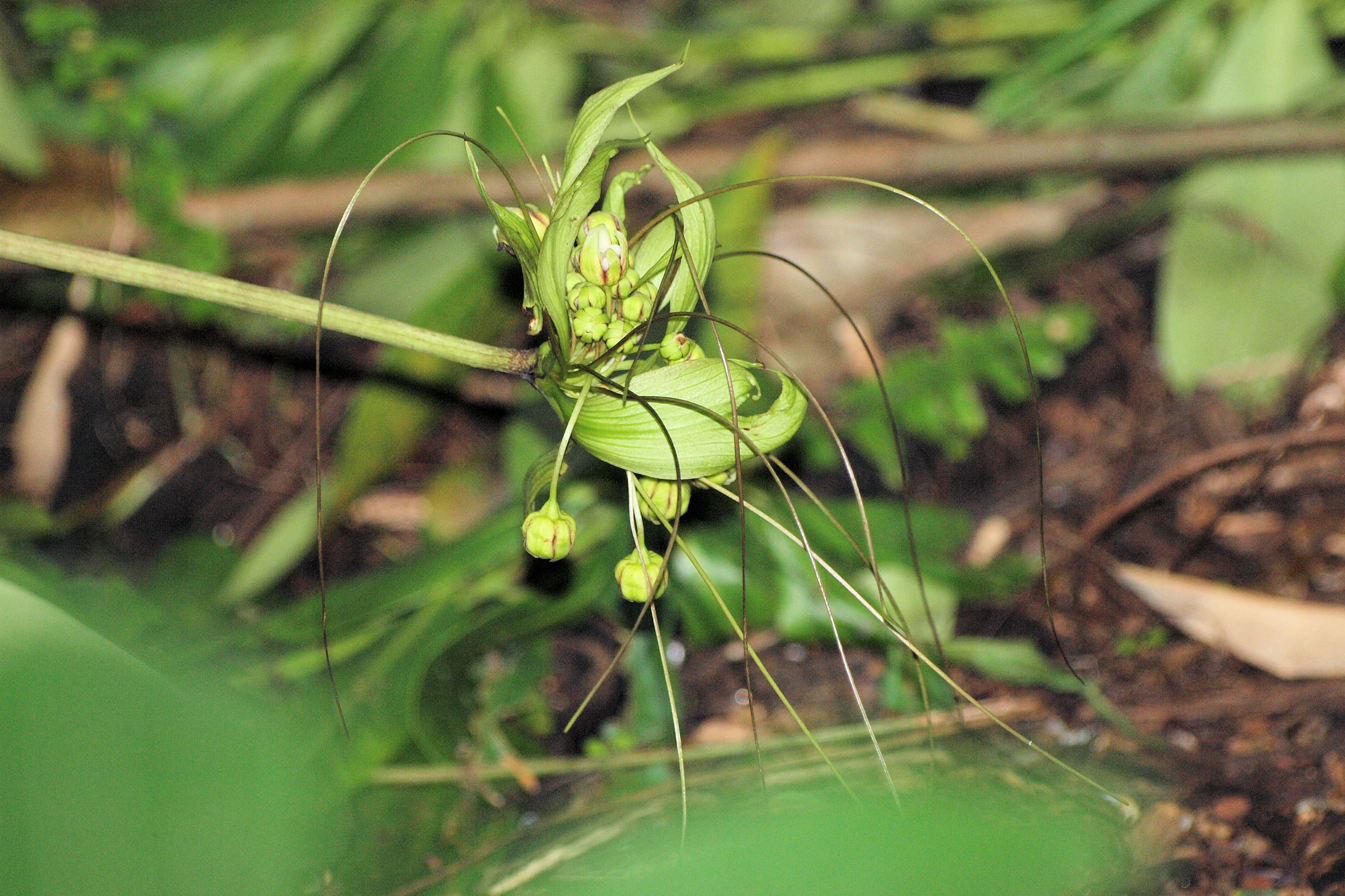

Scientific classification
- Kingdom: Plantae
- Clade: Tracheophytes
- Clade: Angiosperms
- Clade: Monocots
- Order: Dioscoreales
- Family: Dioscoreaceae
- Genus: Tacca
- Species: T. ankaranensis

Binomial name
- Tacca ankaranensis Bard.-Vauc.

= Tacca ankaranensis =

Ankarana arrowroot

Species of flowering plant

Tacca ankaranensis is a species of flowering plant in the yam family Dioscoreaceae, which is endemic to Madagascar. It was discovered on the Ankarana massif in far northern Madagascar.

It was first described in 1997 by Martine Bardot-Vaucoulon.
