= Mirima National Park =

National park in Western Australia

- IUCN category II (national park)
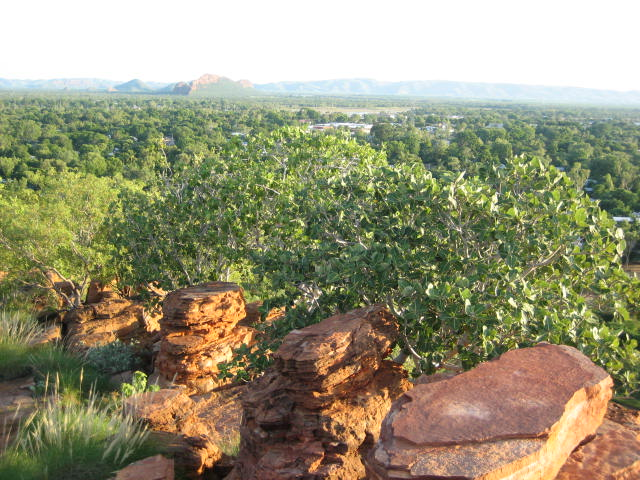
- Kununurra from Mirima National Park lookout

- Location within Western Australia
- Location: Western Australia
- Nearest city: Kununurra
- Coordinates: 15°46′26″S 128°45′49″E
- Area: 20.68 km^{2} (7.98 sq mi)
- Established: 1982
- Governing body: Department of Environment and Conservation
- Website: Official website

Mirima National Park also commonly known as Hidden Valley National Park is a National Park in far northern Western Australia located at the eastern side of the Kimberley region. It is located approximately 2,220 kilometres (1,379 mi) from Perth just outside the township of Kununurra.

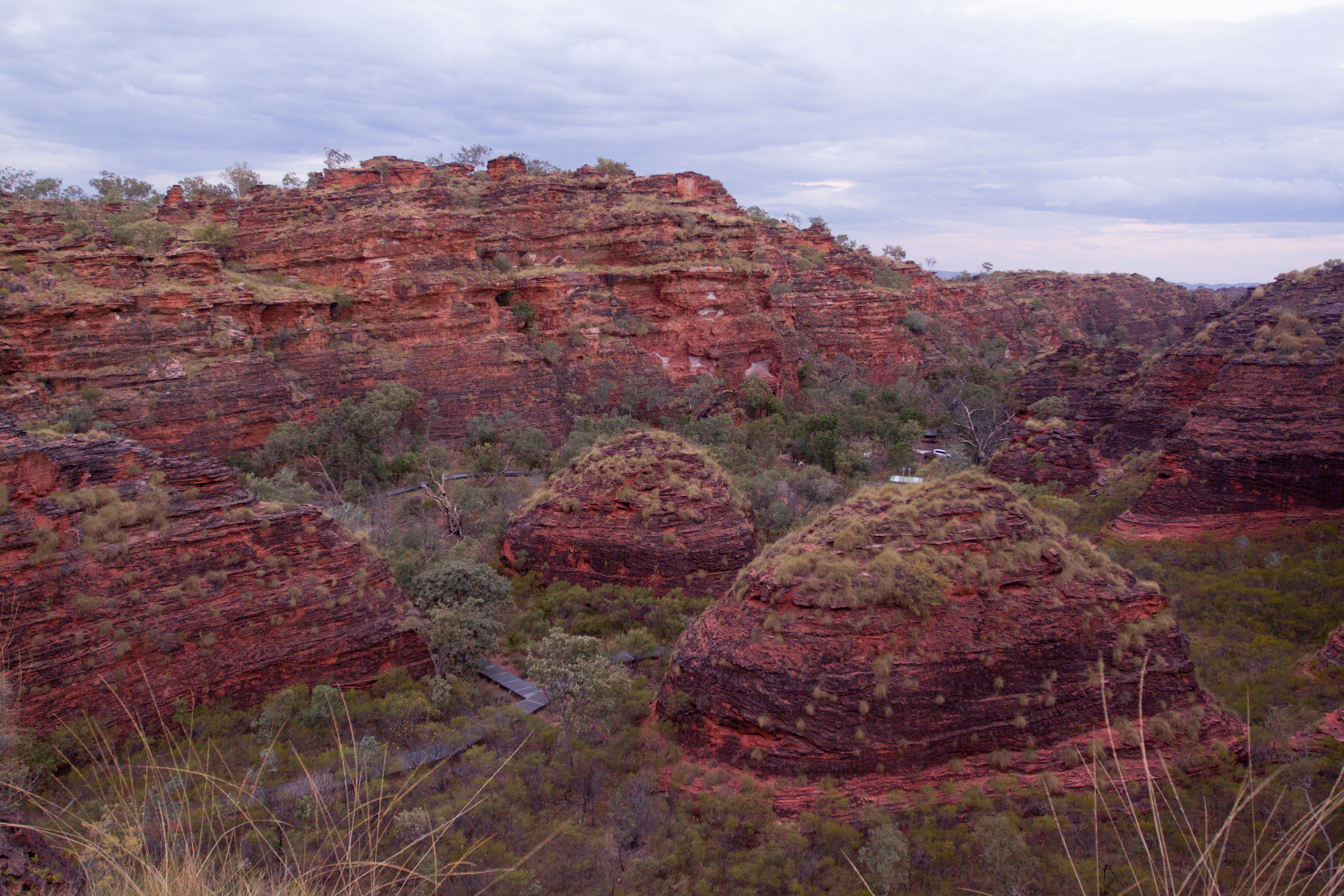
Sandstone formations at Hidden Valley National Park

The park covers a total area of 2,068 hectares (5,110 acres) and was declared a national park in 1982.

Unusual sandstone formations dominate the park and are often compared to the Bungle Bungles.

The area is of great significance to the local indigenous peoples, the Miriuwung, and several examples of rock art can be found within the park.

"Mirima" is the name given by the Miriwoong people to the area extending some 150 kilometres to the north and south, and 170 kilometres to the east and west from Kununurra.

Access to the park is via a sealed bitumen road and an entry fee to the park applies. Camping and fires within the park are not permitted. Facilities include toilets, tables, information shelters and three walk trails around the park.

== See also ==
- Protected areas of Western Australia
