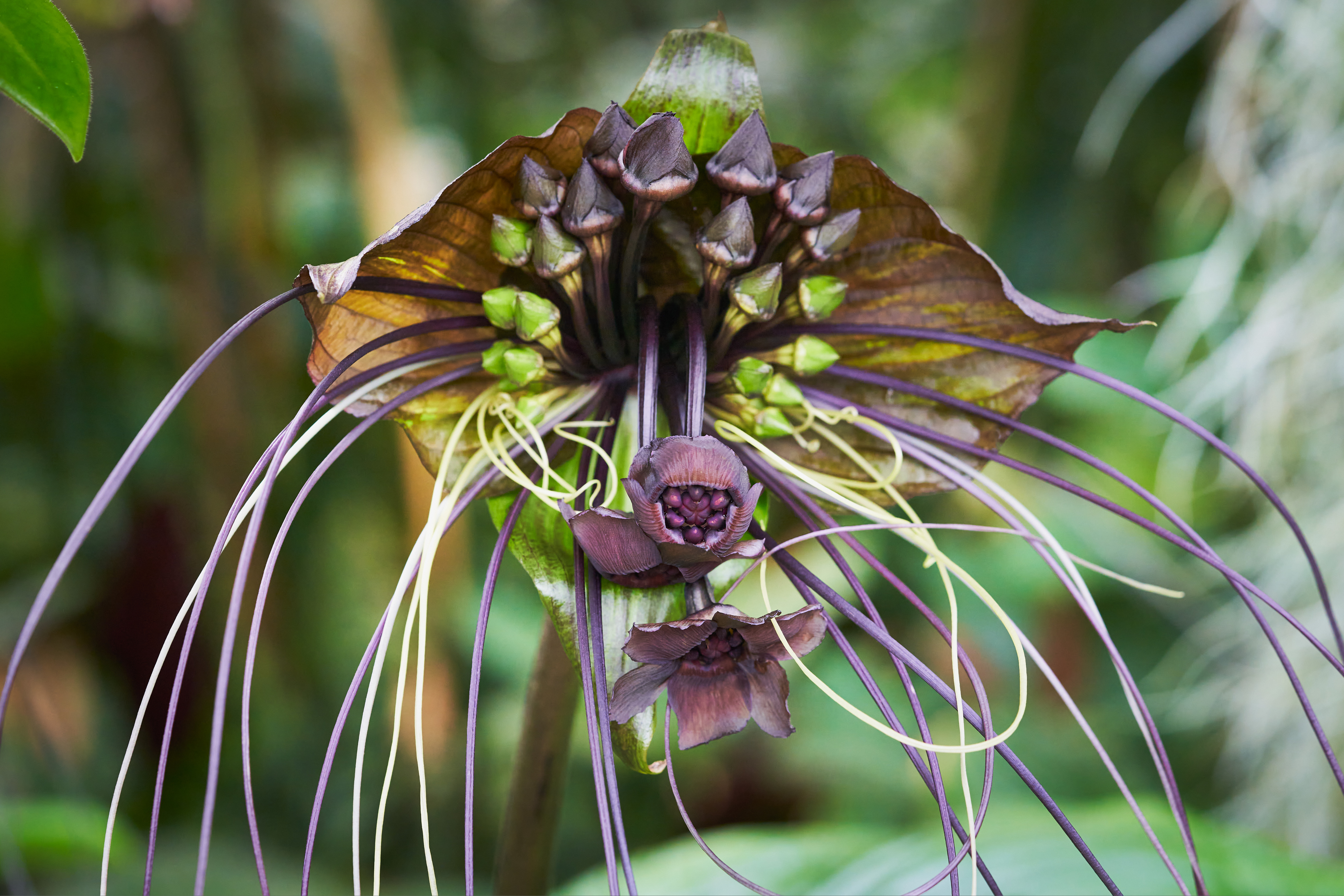

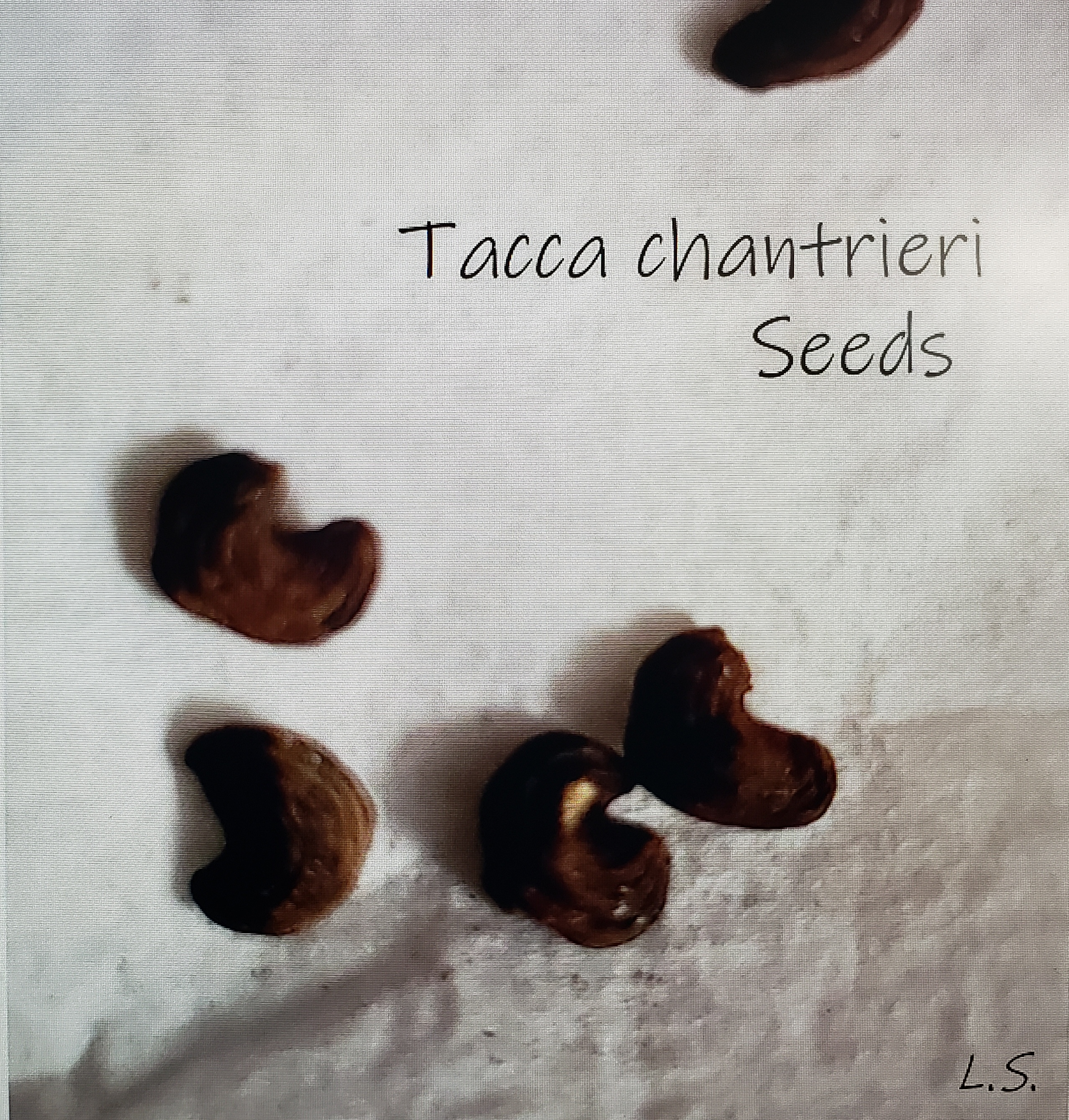
- Seeds of T. chantrieri

Scientific classification
- Kingdom: Plantae
- Clade: Embryophytes
- Clade: Tracheophytes
- Clade: Spermatophytes
- Clade: Angiosperms
- Clade: Monocots
- Order: Dioscoreales
- Family: Dioscoreaceae
- Genus: Tacca
- Species: T. chantrieri

Binomial name
- Tacca chantrieri André, 1901

Synonyms
- Schizocapsa breviscapa (Ostenf.) H.Limpr. Tacca esquirolii (H.Lév.) Rehder; Tacca garrettii Craib; Tacca macrantha H.Limpr. Tacca minor Ridl. Tacca paxiana H.Limpr. Tacca roxburghii H.Limpr. Tacca vespertilio Ridl. Tacca wilsonii H.Limpr. Clerodendrum esquirolii H.Lév.

= Tacca chantrieri =

Black bat flower

Species of plant

Tacca chantrieri is a species of flowering plant in the yam family Dioscoreaceae. It was first described in 1901 by Édouard André. T. chantrieri is native to southeastern Asia. It is commonly known as the black bat flower due to its shape and coloring. The bat flower has unique pollination method in that it is mostly autonomous self pollinating. T. chantrieri prefers environments similar to its native region with tropical, moist conditions. The bat flower has been commonly used in traditional Chinese medicine. Its purported uses are wide in range from common ailments to more complex conditions such as cancer.

== Description ==
There are ten species in the genus Tacca. T. chantrieri is often referred to as the bat flower, devil flower, or cat whiskers. It is an unusual plant in that it has black flowers. T. chantrieri has bracts that look like wings and are large in area. The flower can be up to 12 inches across. Its height can range anywhere from 50–100 cm tall. The bracteoles look like long whiskers hanging from a bat that can be 8-10 inches in length. Some researchers believe that the bracteoles have photosynthetic properties.

== Geographical range ==
T. chantrieri is found in Southeast Asia spanning regions in Assam, Bangladesh, Cambodia, Southern China, Hainan, Laos, Malaysia, Myanmar, Thailand, Tibet, and Vietnam. It covers the widest geographical range of its genus. However, its range has been lessened due to overexploitation, habitat destruction, and forest fragmentation.

== Pollination ==
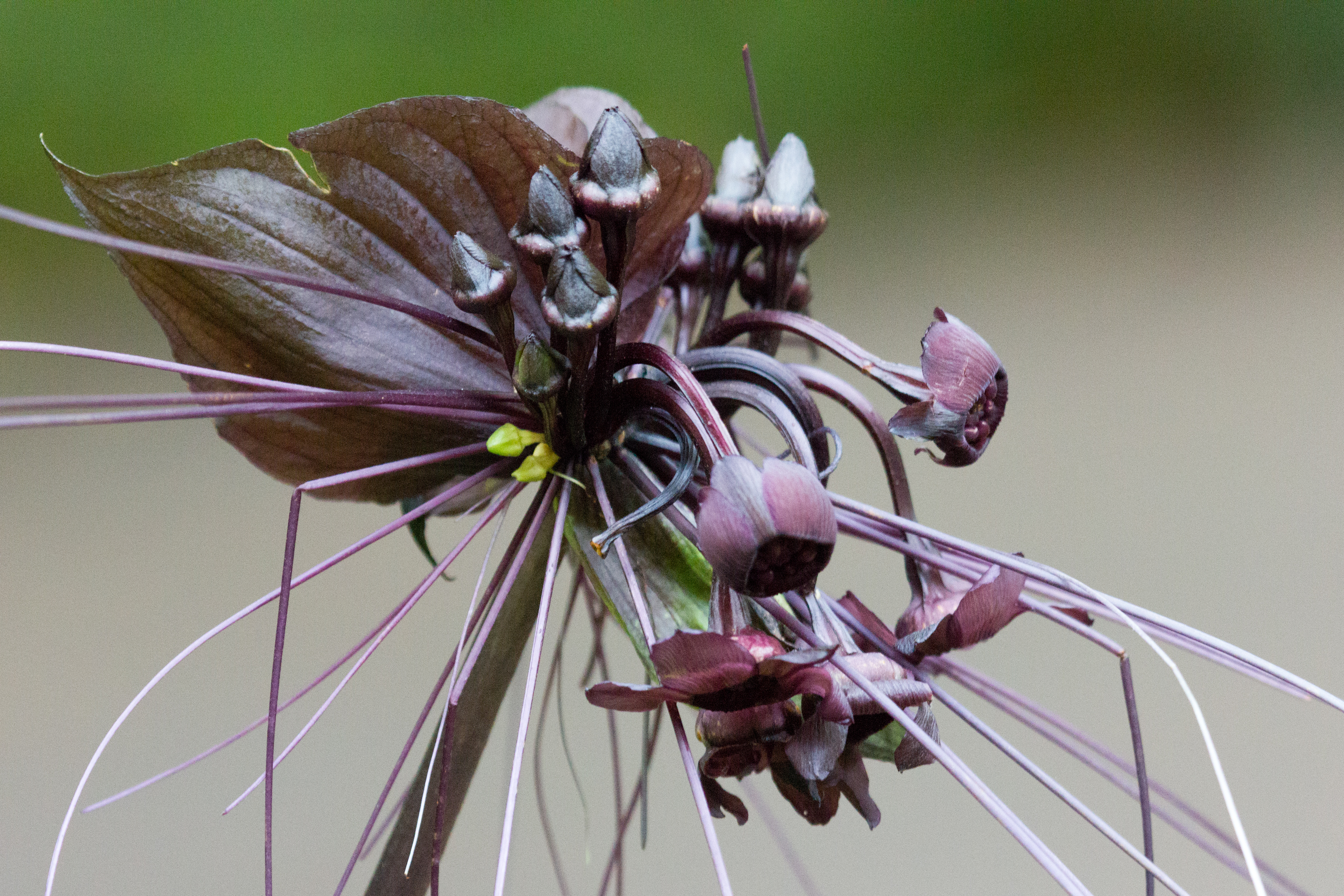
T. chantrieri's stamen, bracts, and bracteoles.

T. chantrieri's colors range from dark brown, purple, and even sometimes green. These colors, under ordinary circumstances, act as a carrion mimic. They attract attention for animals that consume decaying matter; however, that is not the case with T. chantrieri. Flies may enter through the opening in the flower and crawl inside thinking that there is decaying matter in the center of the flower. Light serves as a guide for the flies through the tunnel of the flower; however, because the flowers have nothing to offer to the visitors, they soon try to leave. The structure of the flowers makes this near impossible. It is the "helmet-like stamens" that make it incredibly difficult for the insect to leave the flower. Plants with greater energy investments in floral structures like T. chantrieri are more attractive to pollinators and benefit from increased genetic variability due to cross-pollination. However, pollination experiments for T. chantrieri yielded results that showed despite expensive energy investments in extravagant floral displays, most seeds produced by T. chantrieri resulted from autonomous self-pollination. This may be from bug visitation being infrequent; however, the pollen bundles on most stigmas indicated self-pollination which occurs prior to flower opening. Some believe that it once had a foul smell in order to attract pollinators along with its ornate floral display. Another theory is that there was once a relationship with a pollinator that is now extinct.

== Cultivation ==
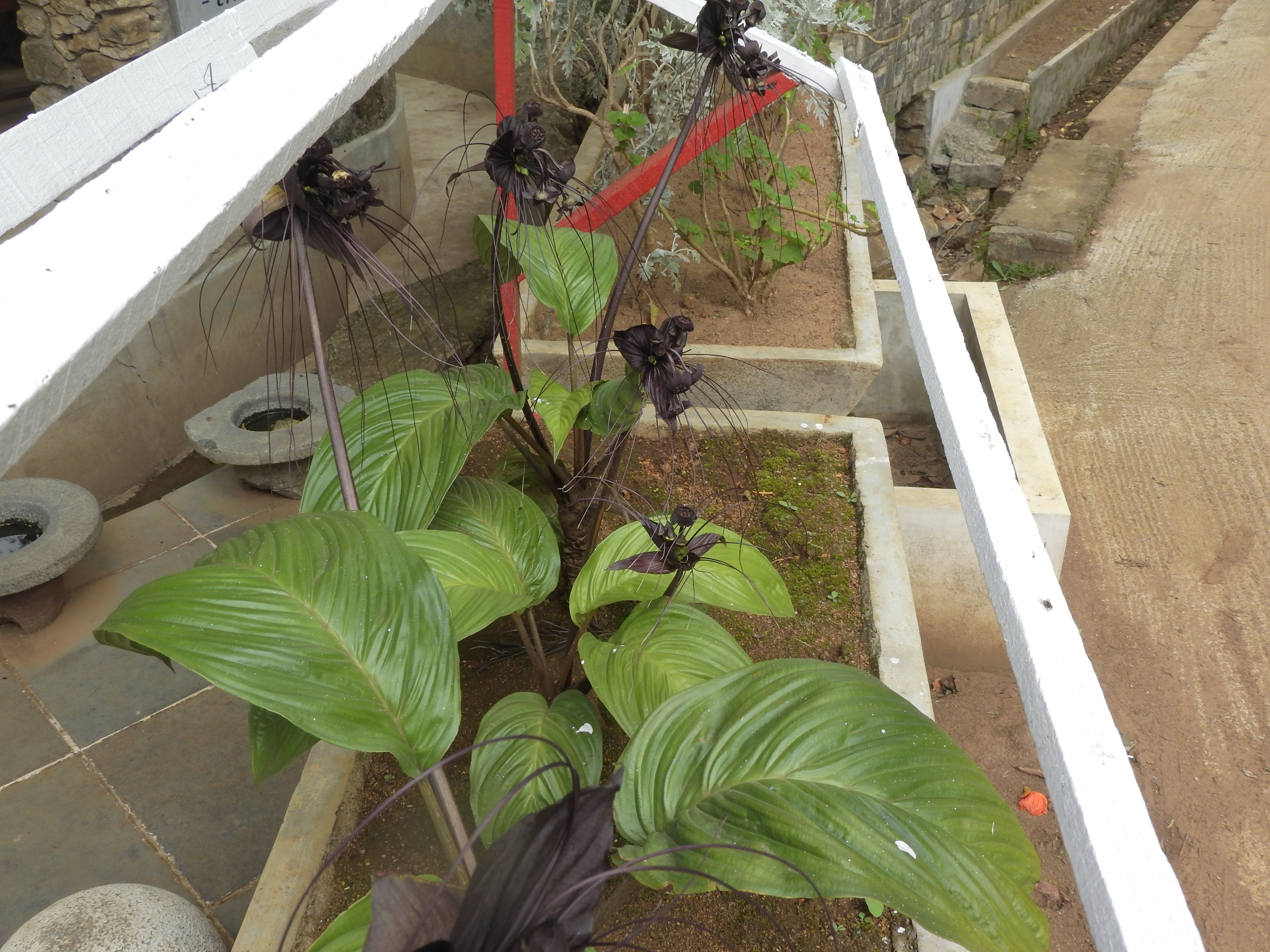
Example of outdoor cultivation of T. chantrieri

T. chantrieri flowers from April to July. The flowering parts of T. chantrieri should be left uncut, if cut the flower will quickly decline. T. chantrieri will begin its flowering process after at least two leaves have grown. It can bloom up to 8 times in one growing season. T. chantrieri has similar growing conditions to Orchids. T. chantrieri is a geophyte, which means it contains rhizomes. T. chantrieri's rhizomes prefer a moist, tropical, and densely nutrient based biome. It can be both an in ground plant and a house plant, it flourishes in low to medium lighted areas. These flowers are mostly free from pest and disease; however, gardeners should be careful of slugs and snails. If the plant is indoors it needs to have a simulated humidity with regular misting. The bat flower can be propagated by the rhizome, tuber division, and sometimes seeds.

== Uses ==
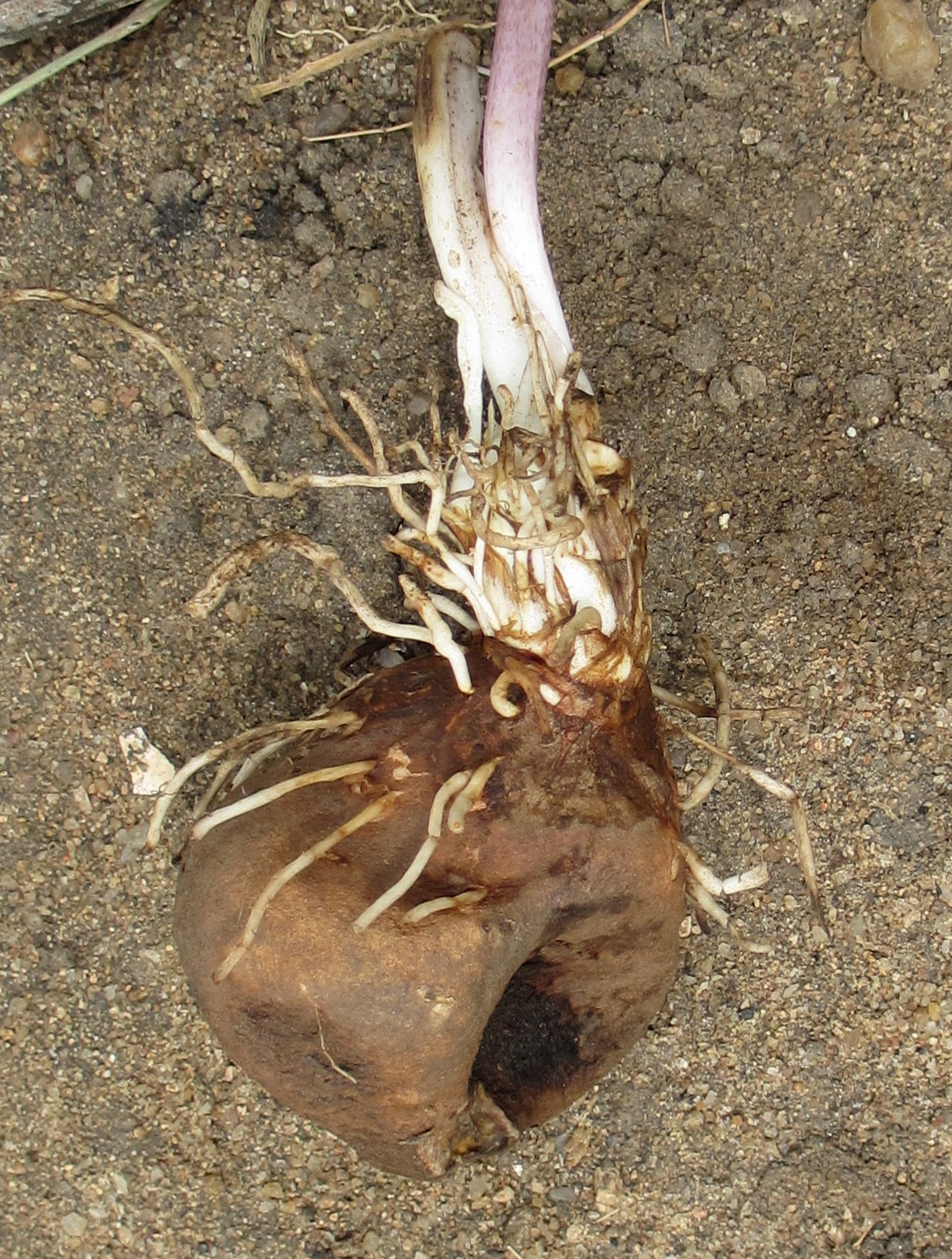
Tuber and rhizomes of T. chantrieri

T. chantrieri has many medicinal properties that have been used in Chinese medicine over history. These qualities lie in T. chantrieri's rhizomes or root stalks. Rhizomes in T. chantrieri contain a wide range of medicinal compounds such as saponins and diarylheptanoids. These medicinal extracts commonly treat ailments such as: high blood pressure, gastric ulcers, burns, hepatitis, and enteritis. These complex compounds are also used for the basis of many common pharmaceuticals. Taccalonolides E and A are microtubule stabilizers that are also derived from root extracts of T. chantrieri. These agents have anticancer properties due to its cytotoxic activity.

== See also ==
- Taccalonolide
- Tacca
