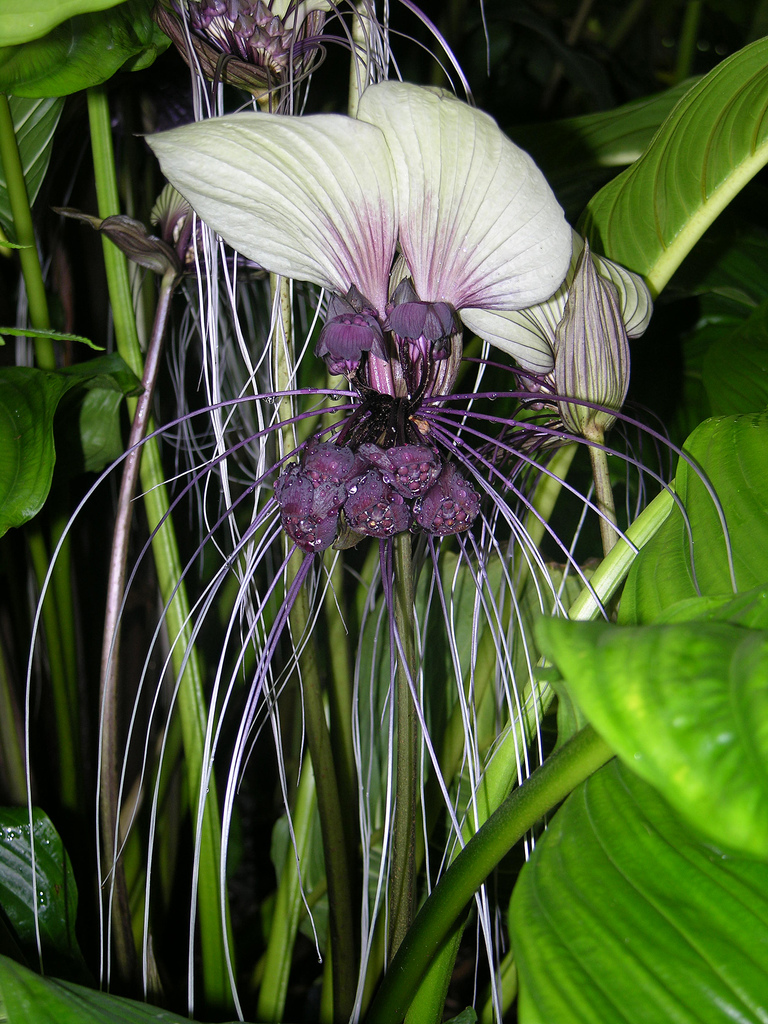

Scientific classification
- Kingdom: Plantae
- Clade: Tracheophytes
- Clade: Angiosperms
- Clade: Monocots
- Order: Dioscoreales
- Family: Dioscoreaceae
- Genus: Tacca
- Species: T. integrifolia

Binomial name
- Tacca integrifolia Ker Gawl., 1812

Synonyms
- Ataccia aspera (Roxb.) Kunth; Ataccia cristata (Jack) Kunth; Ataccia integrifolia (Ker Gawl.) C.Presl; Ataccia laevis (Roxb.) Kunth; Ataccia lancifolia (Zoll. & Moritzi) Kunth; Tacca aspera Roxb.; Tacca choudhuriana Deb; Tacca cristata Jack; Tacca laevis Roxb.; Tacca lancifolia Zoll. & Moritzi; Tacca rafflesiana Jack ex Wall. [Invalid]; Tacca sumatrana H.Limpr.

= Tacca integrifolia =

White batflower

Species of flowering plant

Tacca integrifolia, also known as the white batflower or the black lily, is a species of flowering plant in the family Dioscoreaceae. It is native to tropical and subtropical rainforests in hilly regions of South Asia, including India, Pakistan, Bangladesh, Indochina, the Malay Peninsula, Sumatra, Java and eastern China.

== Habitat ==
It grows in the understorey of humid primary and secondary rainforests. The substrates it grows in are rocky soil and sandy soil underneath leaf litter.

== Description ==
Tacca integrifolia is a herb growing from a thick, cylindrical rhizome as long as 12 cm (5 in) and a diameter of 3 cm (1 in). Its oblong-elliptical or lanceolate leaf blades are borne on long stems, some 50 by 20 cm (20 by 8 in) including the petioles, with tapering bases and slender pointed tips. White batflowers that grow in hilly areas are larger in size than batflowers that grow elsewhere.

=== Umbels ===
The flower scape is about 55 cm (22 in) long and is topped with a pair of involucral bracts, broad and erect, white with mauve venation. Among the individual nodding flowers, which are arranged in an umbel, are further long, filiform (thread-like) bracts. The perianth of each flower is tubular and purplish-black, 1 to 2 cm (0.4 to 0.8 in) long, with two whorls of three perianth lobes, the outer three narrowly oblong 12–15 cm (5–6 in) long and the inner three broadly obovate.

The fruits are fleshy berries some 2 cm (0.8 in) long, and the seeds, which have six longitudinal ridges, have the remains of the perianth lobes still attached.

== Ecology ==
The stamens are attached to the tube of the perianth in a helmet-like manner and, with the flat-topped stigma lobes, may form an insect trap; a sweet musky odour has been detected from these flowers and this may attract flies as pollinators. After pollination, the scape bends over and the developing fruits rest on the ground. The fleshy fruits are a dull colour with soft jelly-like pulp, and it is possible that the seeds are dispersed by rodents and other small mammals as they feed on the fruits.

== Use ==
In the Malay Peninsula, its leaves are dried to make cigarette wrappers.
