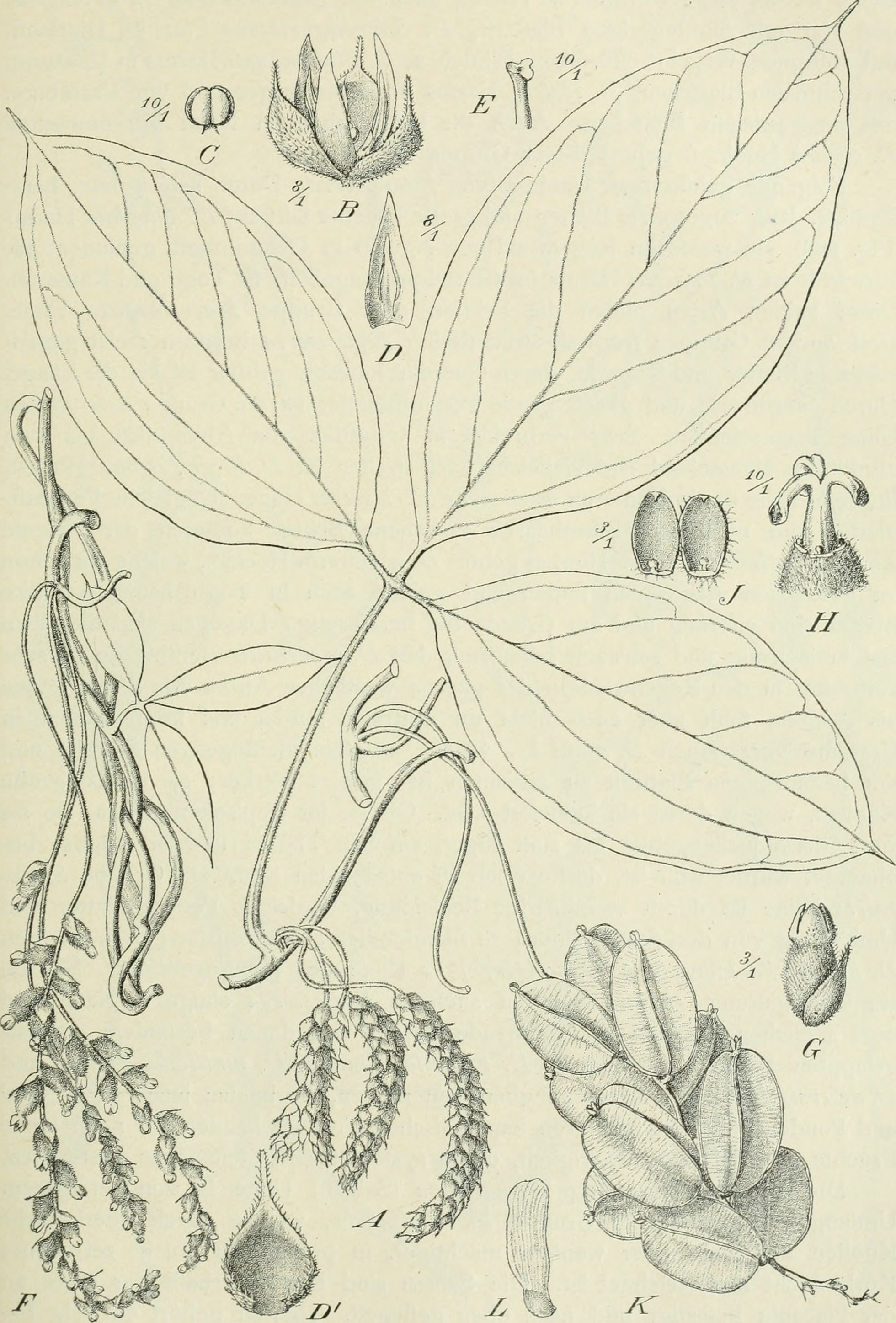
- Die Pflanzenwelt Afrikas, insbesondere seiner tropischen Gebiete - Grundzge der Pflanzenverbreitung im Afrika und die Charakterpflanzen Afrikas (1910)

Conservation status
- Least Concern (IUCN 3.1)

Scientific classification
- Kingdom: Plantae
- Clade: Tracheophytes
- Clade: Angiosperms
- Clade: Monocots
- Order: Dioscoreales
- Family: Dioscoreaceae
- Genus: Dioscorea
- Species: D. quartiniana

Binomial name
- Dioscorea quartiniana A.Rich.

= Dioscorea quartiniana =

Species of herbaceous vine

Dioscorea quartiniana is a climbing tuber geophyte in the family Dioscoreaceae. It is native to Benin, Botswana, Burundi, Chad, Congo, Côte d'Ivoire (Ivory Coast), Eritrea, Ethiopia, Gambia, Ghana, Kenya, Madagascar, Malawi, Mozambique, Namibia, Nigeria, Rwanda, Sierra Leone, South Africa, Sudan, Tanzania, Uganda, Zambia, and Zimbabwe. This species occurs in forests, grasslands, and rocky areas.

== Uses ==
It is cultivated for food in Cameroon and East Nigeria.
