= Dioscorea trilinguis =

Conservation status
- Least Concern (IUCN 3.1)

Scientific classification
- Kingdom: Plantae
- Clade: Tracheophytes
- Clade: Angiosperms
- Clade: Monocots
- Order: Dioscoreales
- Family: Dioscoreaceae
- Genus: Dioscorea
- Species: D. trilinguis

Binomial name
- Dioscorea trilinguis Griseb.

Synonyms
- Dioscorea trilinguis var. edwallii Uline ex R.Knuth

Species of herbaceous vine

Dioscorea trilinguis it is a species of flowering plant in the family Dioscoreaceae. It is a climbing tuberous geophyte that is native to southeastern Brazil (Bahia, Rio de Janeiro, São Paulo), and is found growing in tropical forests, dry forests, and on clay soil.
