= Dioscorea bernoulliana =

Conservation status
- Least Concern (IUCN 3.1)

Scientific classification
- Kingdom: Plantae
- Clade: Tracheophytes
- Clade: Angiosperms
- Clade: Monocots
- Order: Dioscoreales
- Family: Dioscoreaceae
- Genus: Dioscorea
- Species: D. bernoulliana

Binomial name
- Dioscorea bernoulliana Prain & Burkill

Species of yam

Dioscorea bernoulliana is a type of yam in the family Dioscoreaceae. It is native to Belize, Guatemala, Honduras, and Mexico. It usually grows in woodlands, forests, and mangrove swamps.
