= Dioscorea orizabensis =

Conservation status
- Data Deficient (IUCN 3.1)

Scientific classification
- Kingdom: Plantae
- Clade: Tracheophytes
- Clade: Angiosperms
- Clade: Monocots
- Order: Dioscoreales
- Family: Dioscoreaceae
- Genus: Dioscorea
- Species: D. orizabensis

Binomial name
- Dioscorea orizabensis Uline

Species of herbaceous vine

Dioscorea orizabensis is a species of yam in the family Dioscoreaceae. It is native to the Jalisco and Veracruz states of Mexico. The plant is a climbing tuberous geophyte which grows in mountain forests.
