= Fort Pasir Panjang =

Colonial Singapore defensive structure

Coordinates: 01°15′57.39″N 103°48′10.42″E

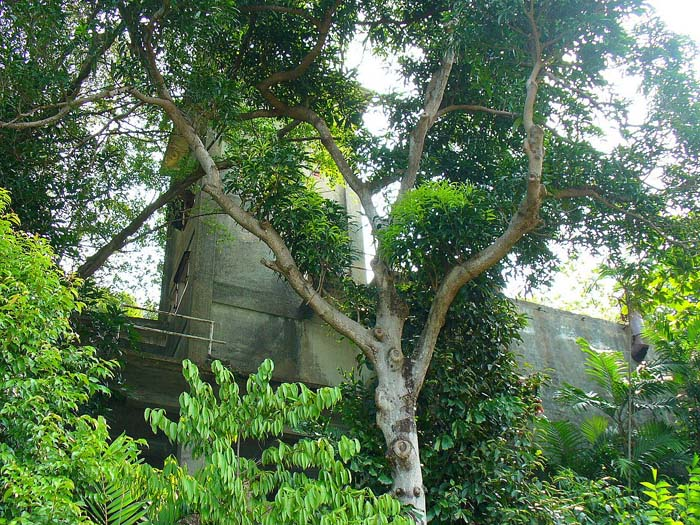
The Fort's watch tower located at the edge of the entrance of Singapore's Keppel Harbour. The tower provided a commanding view of approaching ships entering into the harbour

Fort Pasir Panjang or Labrador Battery is located within Labrador Park at the southern tip of Singapore island. It was one of the 11 coastal artillery forts built by the British in the 19th century to defend the western passageway into Keppel Harbour against piracy and foreign naval powers. During the 1942 Battle of Pasir Panjang, the fort played a supporting role but a limited one in defending the Malay Regiments against the Japanese invasion at Bukit Chandu. In 1995, the site was gazetted by the National Heritage Board as one of the 11 World War II sites in Singapore.

== History ==
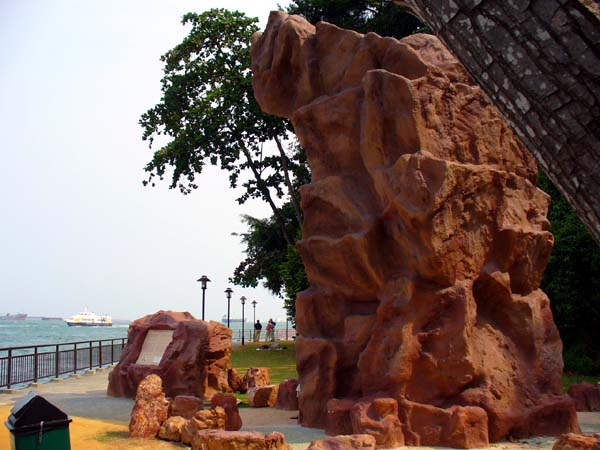
The symbolic replica of the Long Ya Men at Tanjong Berlayer near where Fort Pasir Panjang stands

Labrador was named after Labrador Bay which it overlooks the deep and calm water off its shores. The Long Ya Men or "Dragon's Teeth Gate", two craggy granite outcrops formerly stood on each side of the entrance to the New Harbour (now Keppel Harbour) as a navigation landmark to ancient mariners. The two rock outcrops were subsequently blown up by the Straits Settlement surveyor, John Thomson, in August 1848 to widen the entrance to the harbour. Labrador's strategic value was recognised by the British as early as 1843 when plans were made to set up defences to protect Singapore, an important trading post founded by Sir Stamford Raffles of the British East India Company in 1819.

=== Piracy ===
The New Harbour was later renamed as Keppel Harbour in 1900 after Admiral Sir Henry Keppel of HMS Meander, who carried out an on-site survey to build an anchorage in the harbour in the 1880s. He was also known for his successful campaigns against the pirates in 1842 that were boldly harassing merchant ships in close proximity to the harbour. Piracy became less of a danger to the trade of Singapore only from the 1850s.

The original, Western Harbour limit is marked by a white obelisk, near the former site of Long Ya Men. This obelisk still stands at Tanjong Berlayer Point ("Tanjong" means "land's end" in Malay) to indicate where the southernmost tip of the Asian Continent was.

=== Defences ===
In 1878, as part of the review of the defences of Singapore against threats from European powers in the region, it was decided that forts be built on either side of the entrance to New Harbour. Fort Pasir Panjang was built on Labrador and Fort Siloso on Pulau Blakang Mati (now Sentosa). It was found that the steep cliffs and thick mangrove swamps surrounding the two forts acted as an ideal natural barrier to intruders.

==== Underwater mines ====
To strengthen the defence further, by 1881, mines were laid in the waters between the two forts and the eastern entrance of the harbour. The mines were tethered to the seabed but floated dangerously under the surface of the water unseen to any enemy marine vessels. To enable safe passage of ships, a 'friendly safe channel' was created through the minefields. The work involved in the laying of minefields under the narrow channel (just 240 m apart) had actually led to rumours that tunnels running under the channels were constructed to link the two forts. There are, however, no archival records to prove that these tunnels were ever constructed.

==== Gun emplacements ====
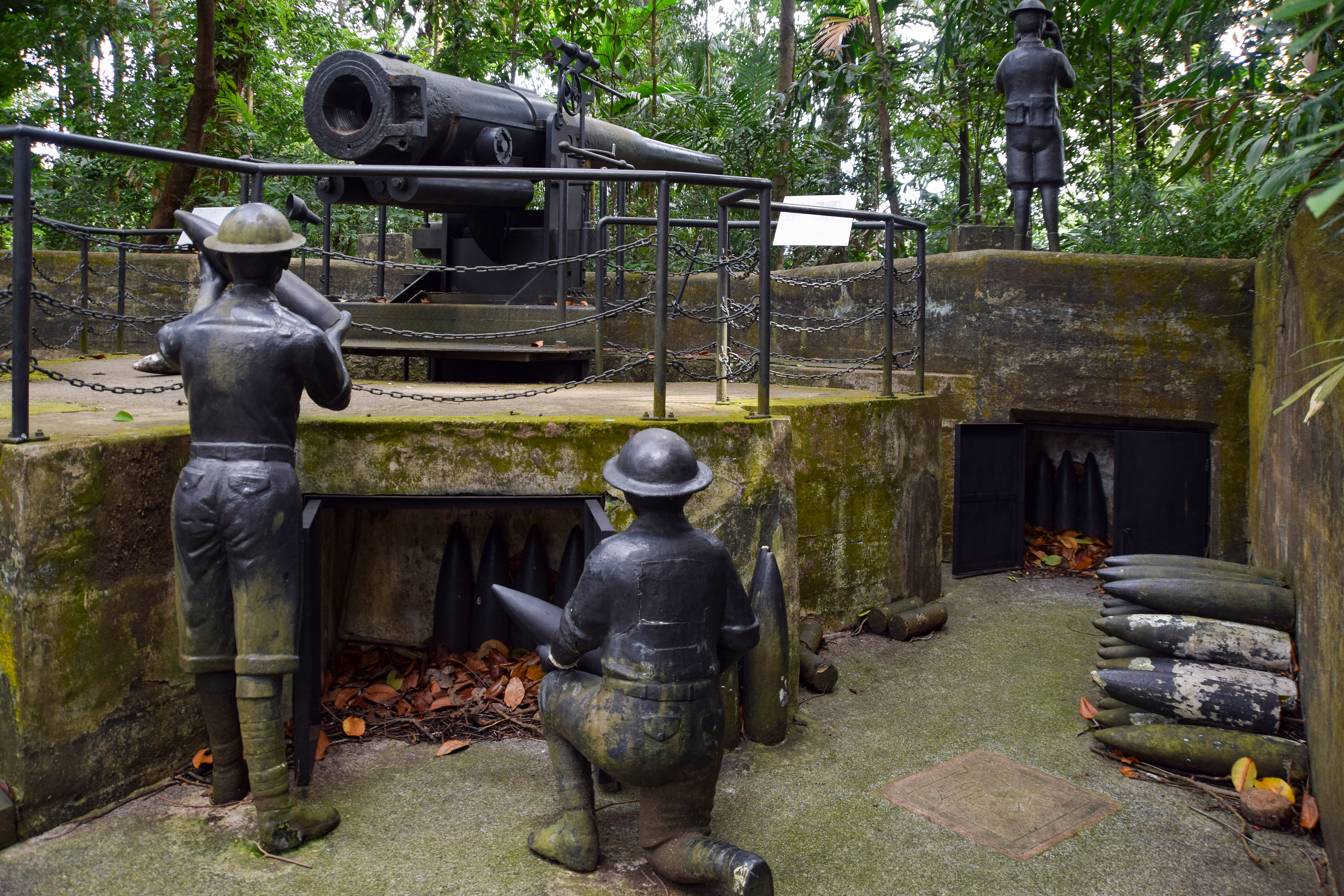
A gun emplacement of Fort Pasir Panjang outfitted with a QF 6-inch Mk II rifled Breech Loading gun (2024)

The Fort came under the operation of the 7th Coast Artillery Regiment, which received orders from Faber Fire Command led by Brigadier A.D. Curtiss. A gun emplacement is a position or platform specially prepared to support large heavy guns and artillery. The first type of gun put on Fort Pasir Panjang was the 7-inch Rifled Muzzle-Loading (R.M.L.). Two of these guns were first installed in 1878 so as to provide a temporary defence for the fort. They were, however, removed soon after.

The defence reviews of 1885, then proposed that these guns be reinstalled together with the 9.2-inch Rifled Breech-Loading (R.B.L.) guns. While the latter guns came into the Fort much later, the 7-inch R.M.L. were already in place by 1886.

In 1896, a proposal was forwarded to replace the 7-inch R.M.L. gun with two 6-inch Quick-Firing (Q.F.) guns. This came out of the suggestion that the 7-inch R.M.L. has neither sufficient range accuracy nor rapidity of fire for effective defence. Even the engineer of the Fort, H.E. McCallum referred to these guns as being "the worst in the service".

The emplacement was eventually modified to contain 2 × 6 in (152 mm) Q.F. guns. This modern type of gun definitely better in terms of its accuracy and rapidity to counter the speedy motor torpedo boats that appeared in the 1880s. Each shell used by these 6-inch Q.F. weighed 45 kilograms.

==== 7-inch rifled muzzle-loading gun ====
- Weight: 6.5 tons.
- Muzzle velocity: 1,500 feet per second (460 m/s).
- Rounds per minute: 2–3
- Type of ammunition used: Common shells, shrapnel shells and case shots.

==== 6-inch quick-firing gun ====
- Weight: 7 tons.
- Muzzle velocity 2,150 feet per second (655 m/s).
- Rounds per minute: 25–30.
- Maximum range: 15,700 yards (14,400 m) on a central pivot.

==== The Casemate ====
The Casemate was built in 1886 to serve as an ammunition store for the guns. It also acted as a shelter for gunners and infantry groups stationed at the Fort. It is situated at the highest point of the hill and served the 9.2-inch R.M.L. guns nearby. The casemate has four rooms, one of the rooms held the entrance to a tunnel that led to underground store rooms beneath the first emplacement. Lim Bo Seng, a war hero of Singapore, was a major brick supplier in the late 1930s, with his main client, the colonial government. Bricks supplied by Lim lay in certain sections of the casemates at the Fort. His other projects included the construction of Alexandra Hospital, the army barracks in Changi and many defence works in the 1930s.

==== Tunnels ====
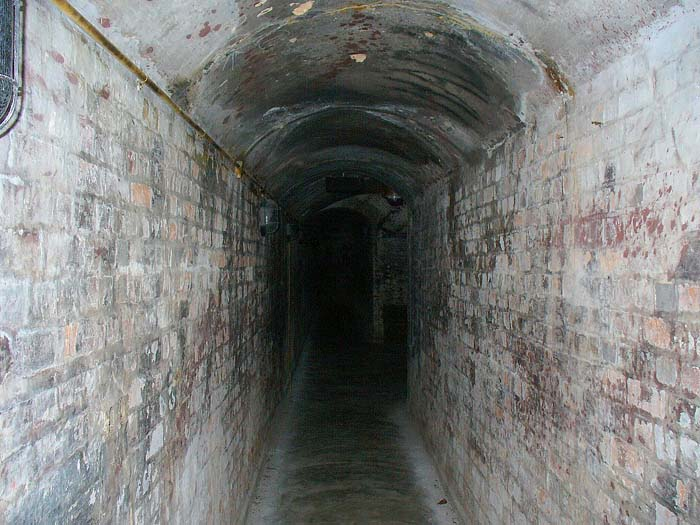
A hidden tunnel leading to the ammunition store below the gun emplacement of Fort Pasir Panjang

The tunnels, constructed in 1886, leads to underground storerooms constructed to serve gun emplacements located directly above it. To date, the tunnels serving Gun Emplacement III are the most extensive tunnels discovered at Labrador Park.

As one walks into the tunnel, there is an enlarged chamber allowing for two-way human traffic. This was important since the walkways in the tunnel tended to be very narrow. The tunnel then splits into two. One branch leads to the cartridge storeroom and hoist area, while the other leads to the shell storeroom and hoist area. A hoist is a mechanical pulley system to lift the shells and cartridges from the underground room to the emplacement above it. The allocation of separation hoists for the shells and the cartridges allows for convenience and a more systematic operation of the gun above.

As per 2016, the tunnel entrances have been sealed off from public.

==== Uses of the underground rooms ====
The underground storerooms played important roles in the Fort. For one, they protected ammunition from being ignited by enemy fire. Secondly, the use of hoists facilitated easy movement and retrieval of ammunition. Thirdly, the tunnel provided protection for the gunners not involved in the actual manning of the gun. Lastly, they help to protect the gun and gunners above from any accidental explosions in the underground room itself. The tunnels lead to the following areas:

- Lighting room — Given the inflammable nature of the store, no naked flames were allowed in any rooms with the exception of this room.
- Cartridge room — For the storage of cartridges.
- Cartridge lift area — Where the hoist raising the cartridges to the emplacement aboveground was found.
- Filled shell store — For the storage of shells filled with gunpowder.
- Shell lift area — Where the hoist raising the Filled Shells to the emplacement aboveground was found.

=== Japanese invasion ===
Before the onset of World War II (WWII), Fort Pasir Panjang was subsequently upgraded to Labrador Battery. Tank obstacles, land mines and beach defences were put in place around the Fort. Air bases and garrisons were quickly sited in Malaya to counter the Japanese invasion threat. In anticipation of a coastal attack, 11 forts and gun batteries protected the coastal south of Singapore:

1. Fort Pasir Panjang
2. Fort Siloso
3. Mount Imbiah Battery
4. Fort Serapong
5. Fort Connaught
6. Fort Canning
7. Fullerton
8. Palmer
9. Faber Fire Command
10. Fort Silingsing
11. Fort Teregah

By the eve of the Japanese invasion, Singapore had become one of the most fortified countries in the world.

=== Battle for Pasir Panjang ===
By 13 February 1942, the Japanese had already reached Pasir Panjang Ridge (present Kent Ridge Park) after destroying the Allied artillery force on Chwee Chian Hill (where Poh Ern Shih Temple stands today). This location was near the Alexandra area where the main ammunition stores and a military hospital were situated. The men of the 1st Battalion, Charlie Company, Malay Regiment, led by Lieutenant Adnan Bin Saidi fought bravely to the last. Many Japanese soldiers were killed or wounded. The guns from Labrador assisted the Malay Regiment in their 48-hour struggle against the Japanese by firing high-explosive shells at enemy troops. However, with Japanese reinforcements, the Malay Regiment were finally surrounded and massacred. Three lucky ones, together with Lieutenant Abbas Abdul-Manan managed to escape and later rejoined 30 surviving soldiers of a British battalion in the nearby area.

After their conquest of Pasir Panjang Ridge, the Japanese proceeded to march towards the city of Singapore for their final decisive thrust against remaining Allied forces there. Perched on a hill (near present Keppel Country Club) along Pasir Panjang Road, the escaped Malay and British soldiers had gathered together and waited patiently to ambush the Japanese convoy heading towards the city. Using mounted Bofors guns, they let loose deluge of gunshots causing the Japanese to scramble for cover. The Japanese tanks attempted to move forward to engage the enemy but they could not advance due to the sea of dead and wounded bodies blocking its way. About 100 Japanese soldiers were killed during the ambush before the Anglo-Malay force retreated to the city to join their fellow men for their final stand against the Japanese.

=== Alexandra Hospital massacre ===
On 14 February 1942, seeking reprisal for their great loss and also retaliation against retreating soldiers from the 44th Indian Brigade who had fired from Alexandra Hospital, 3 groups of Japanese soldiers went on a blind rampage and entered the hospital from the rear bayoneting everyone they found, regardless of whether they were soldiers, patients and medical staff. They killed a British officer, Lieutenant W.E.J. Weston, who was carrying a white flag to meet them. Even a young patient, Corporal Holden, who was lying on an operating table was not spared. About 200 defenceless souls were massacred. Some managed to escape death by falling to the floor and pretending to be dead.

The following day, Lieutenant-General Renya Mutaguchi, commander of the Japanese 18th Division toured the hospital and distributed tinned fruits, all the while apologising profusely for the brutality of his soldiers and assured the staff of their safety. He also ordered the execution of the Japanese soldiers responsible for the massacre, within the hospital grounds.

=== Ineffective guns ===
A common misunderstanding is that the British only anticipated a seaward attack and that the guns of Singapore could only fire out to sea. On the eve of the Japanese attack on Singapore, with the exception of the 15" guns at the Buona Vista Battery, all large guns in Singapore had 360-degree traverse. The guns of the Labrador Battery could and did fire inland as they did at advancing Japanese troops in February 1942.

Nonetheless, the Labrador Battery guns had limited effect during the battle and the rounds allocated to it were more armour-piercing cartridges rather than high explosive rounds which were more effective against the infantry. As a result, these guns were ineffective and saw little action during the Battle of Singapore.

== Aftermath ==
Before the British surrendered to the Japanese on 15 February 1942, they destroyed all remaining coastal artillery to prevent any possible usage by the invading Japanese forces.

After World War II, there was a worldwide disbandment of British forts as advances in air defence systems caused them to become obsolete. Today, the ruins of coastal fortifications are still visible at Labrador Battery, Mount Faber, Fort Siloso and Fort Canning that serve as a lasting reminder of their wartime legacy in Fortress Singapore.

== See also ==
- Fort Siloso
- Fort Canning
- Fort Tanjong Katong

== Bibliography ==
- Lim, David (2005). Labrador Park—The Adventure Begins. Singapore: SNP Panpac. ISBN 981-252-855-5.
- Bose, Roman (1995). Fortress Singapore—The Battlefield Guide. Singapore: Times Book International. ISBN 981-204-365-9.
- Patridge, Jeff (1998). Alexandra Hospital: From British Military to Civilian Institution 1938—1998. Singapore: Alexandra Hospital & Singapore Polytechnic Publication. ISBN 981-04-0430-1.
- National Library Board (2004). Picture Collection—"Fortress Singapore"? A Week To Remember (February 8th to 15th 1942). Singapore: National Library Board.
