= Tanjong Katong MRT station =

Mass Rapid Transit station in Singapore

Tanjong Katong TE25 丹戎加东 தஞ்சோங் காத்தோங்
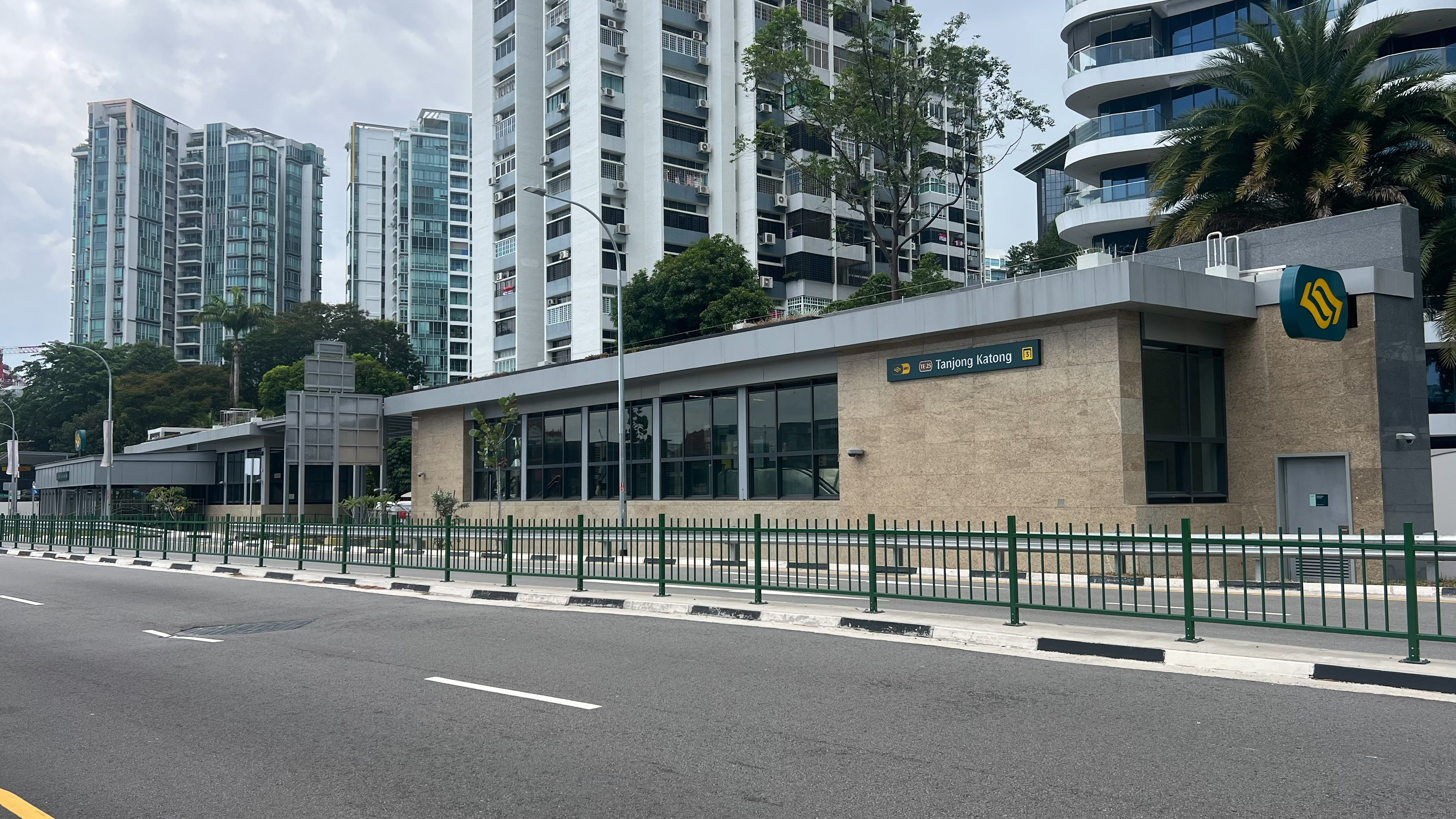
- Exit 3 of the station

General information
- Location: 2 Amber Road, Singapore 439846
- Coordinates: 01°17′57″N 103°53′51″E
- System: Mass Rapid Transit (MRT) station
- Owner: Land Transport Authority
- Operator: SMRT Trains
- Line: Thomson–East Coast Line
- Platforms: 2 (2 stacked platforms)
- Tracks: 2
- Connections: Bus, Taxi

Construction
- Structure type: Underground
- Platform levels: 2
- Cycle facilities: Yes
- Accessible: Yes

Other information
- Station code: TKT

History
- Opened: 23 June 2024; 2 years ago
- Former names: Amber

Services
Preceding station	Mass Rapid Transit	Following station
Katong Park towards Woodlands North	Thomson–East Coast Line	Marine Parade towards Bayshore
Track layout
Location
- Location within Singapore Rail central area

Tanjong Katong MRT station is an underground Mass Rapid Transit (MRT) station on the Thomson–East Coast Line (TEL) in Singapore. Located underneath Amber Road at the intersection with Tanjong Katong Road South and Meyer Road, the station serves nearby condominiums such as Aalto and King's Mansion. The station is operated by SMRT Trains.

First announced in August 2014 as Amber MRT station, the station was renamed following a public poll in July 2016. Six houses and an apartment were acquired for the station's construction, despite opposition from the owners over compensation disputes. Tanjong Katong station commenced operations on 23 June 2024 along with the other stations of TEL Phase 4.

Built with a stacked platform configuration, the station features circular skylights and a leaf-shaped ceiling over the concourse. The station features two public artworks, The Waters Are Blue, Yet I Pine For You by Sim Chi Yin as part of the Art in Transit (AIT) Programme and Riding the Waves of Change by students of Tanjong Katong Girls' School (TKGS).

== History ==
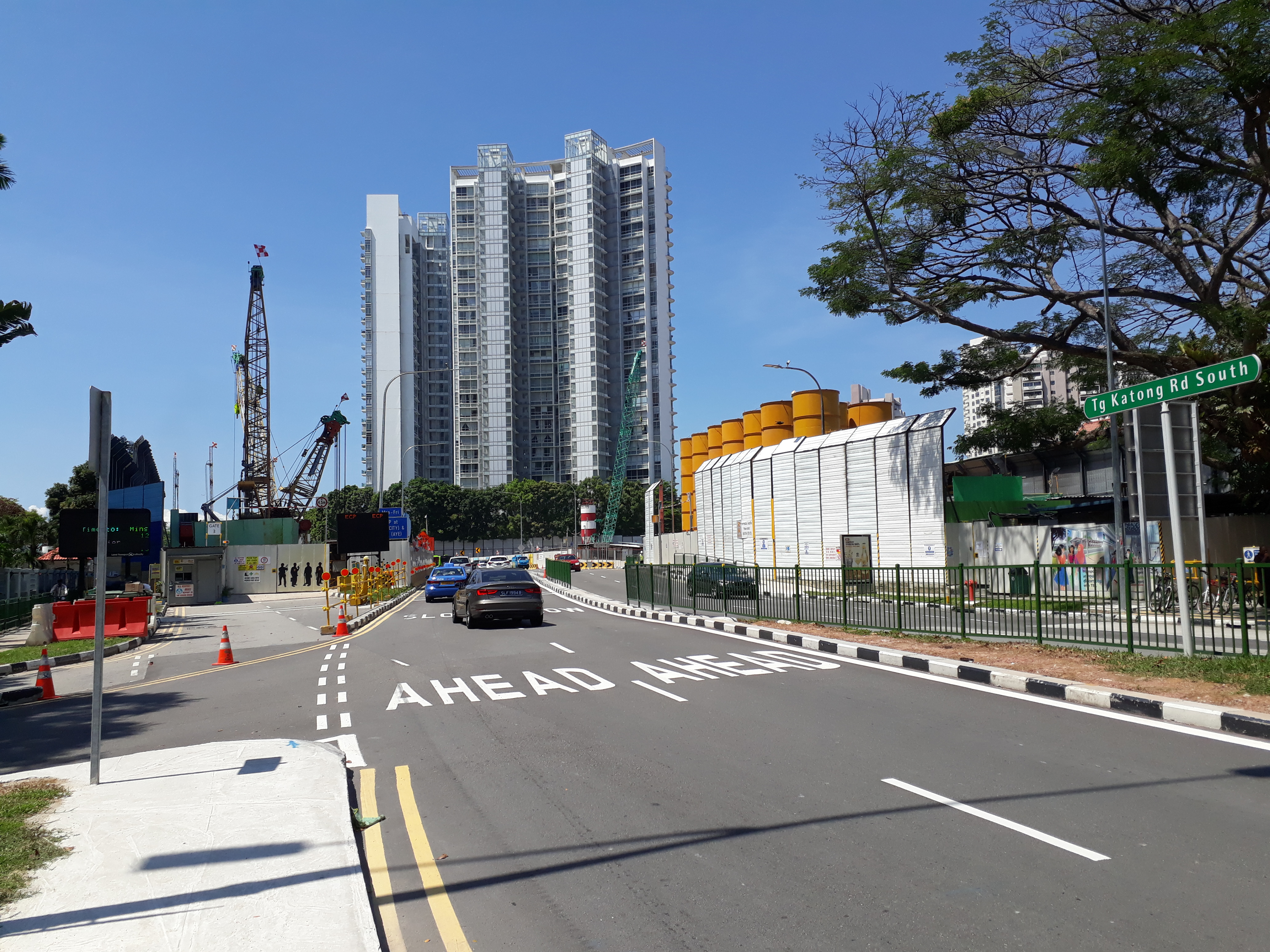
Tanjong Katong station under construction in April 2019

In August 2014, the Land Transport Authority (LTA) announced that Amber station would be part of the proposed Thomson–East Coast Line (TEL), with the station to be constructed as part of the TEL's eastern stretch, consisting of 9 stations between Tanjong Rhu and Sungei Bedok. For the entire month of October 2015, there was a public poll for the names of stations in the eastern portion of the TEL, including Amber, where its alternative proposed name was "Tanjong Katong". Following the poll, it was announced in July 2016 that the station name will be Tanjong Katong.

The contract for the design and construction of Tanjong Katong station was awarded to Woh Hup (Private) Limited for S$146 million in April 2016. Construction was scheduled to commence in that year with a targeted completion date of 2023.

External Image
- Artist's impression of Tanjong Katong MRT station Source: Woh Hup Pte Ltd

Six semi-detached houses along Amber Road and a three-storey apartment block along Tanjong Katong Road were acquired to build the station by the Singapore Land Authority (SLA). The acquisition was opposed by the affected residents as they felt the 18-month period for relocation was "too tight" and the compensation sum too low. In April 2016, two residents still stayed at the apartment block while the owners sought more compensation through the Appeals Board (Land Acquisition). The owner of Sin Aik Provision shop at the ground floor claimed he needed more time to move out the goods and find a new shop space. However, the SLA rejected the request as it would delay the TEL construction beyond 2023, and gave the owners until 31 May to move out or face eviction. Construction started by July 2016.

By January 2019, Tanjong Katong along with other stations in the Tanjong Rhu-Bayshore stretch were designated to be 'Stage 4' of the TEL. Initially expected to open in 2023, it was pushed to 2024 along with other TEL Stage 4 stations due to delays from the COVID-19 pandemic. In October 2022, it was announced that Stage 4 of the TEL was expected to open in 2024. In February 2024, the LTA handed over the TEL Stage 4 stations to SMRT Trains for final testing. A month later, the LTA announced that the station would open on 23 June, with an open house event held between 10:00 am and 9:00 pm on 21 June to allow commuters to familiarise themselves with the new stations. Tanjong Katong station opened on 23 June 2024.

== Details ==
Tanjong Katong station serves the TEL and is between the Katong Park and Marine Parade stations, with an official station code of TE25. As part of the TEL, the station is operated by SMRT Trains. Located underneath Amber Road near the junction of Tanjong Katong Road South and Meyer Road, the station has three entrances serving nearby private residential properties including the Aalto, Amber Skye, King's Mansion, and One Amber.

Due to land constraints, the station has a stacked platform configuration. The station box has a depth of 25 metres (82 ft). Circular skylights over the escalators allow natural illumination of the station in daytime. Two of the station entrances have green roofs with solar panels. The leaf-shaped ceiling of the ticketing concourse is inspired by the history of Tanjong Katong. Like the other TEL4 stations, hybrid cooling fans at the platforms complement the station's air-conditioning to improve air circulation while lowering energy consumption.

Platform on different levels

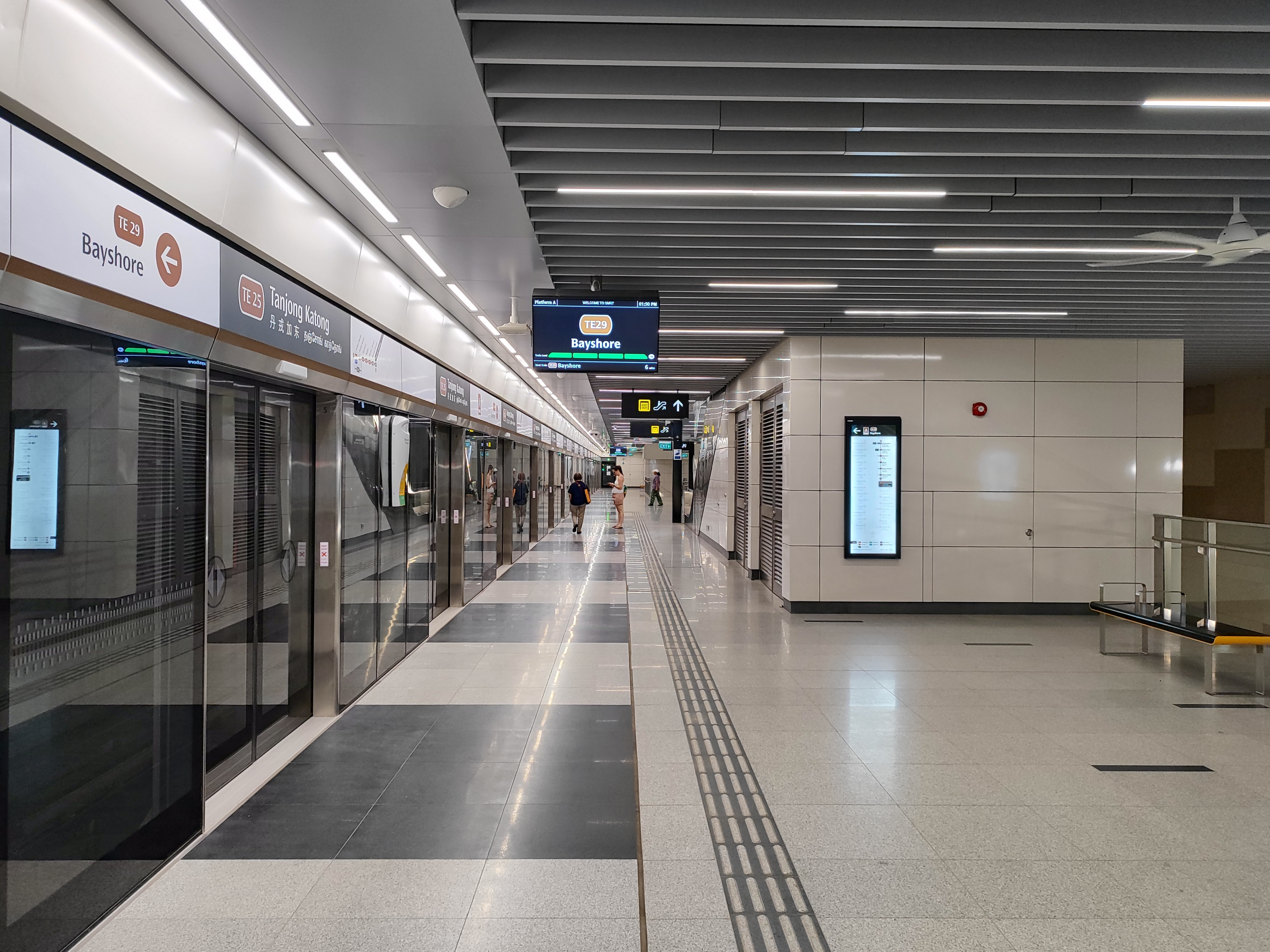
Platform A (upper)

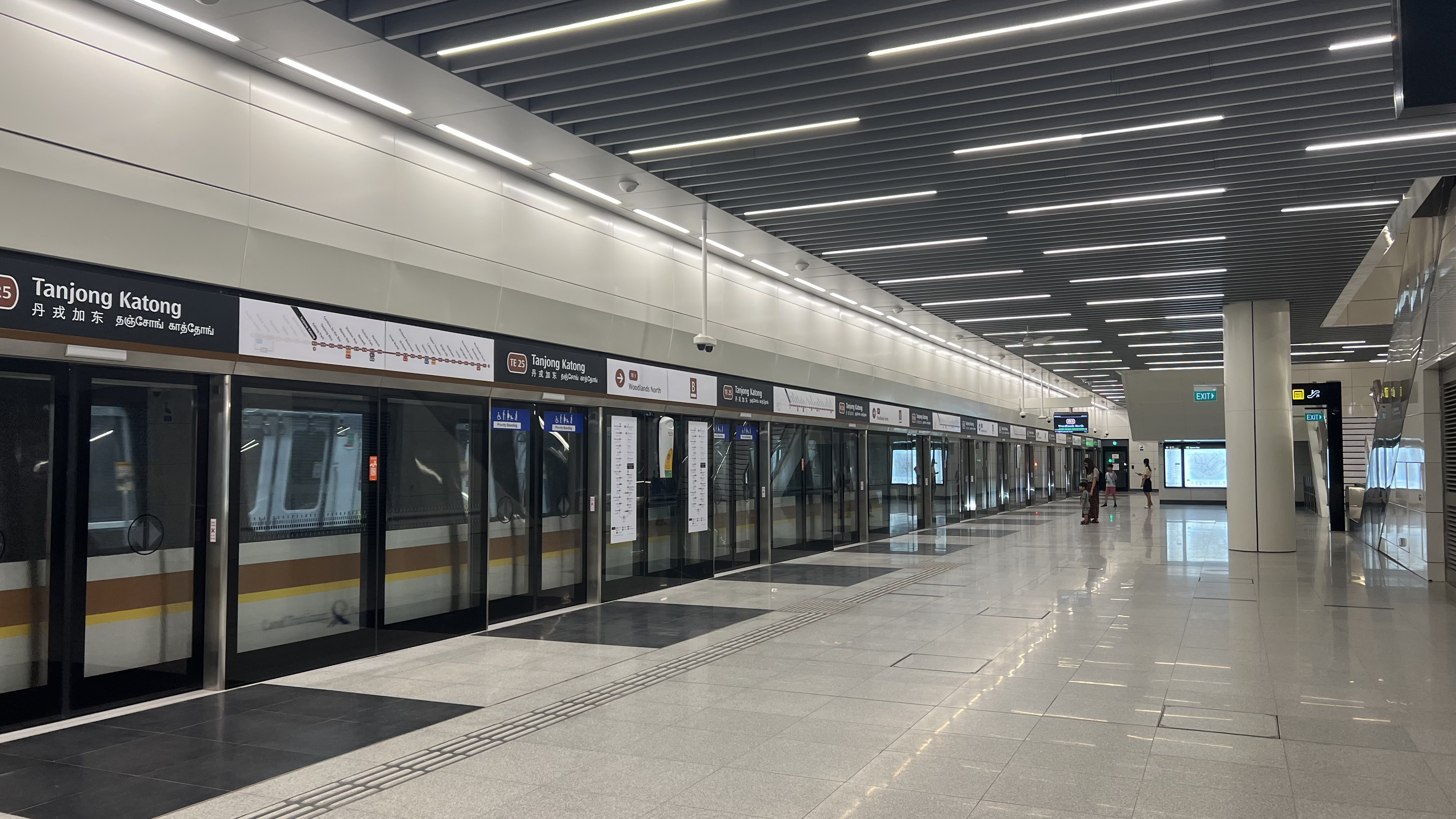
Platform B (lower)

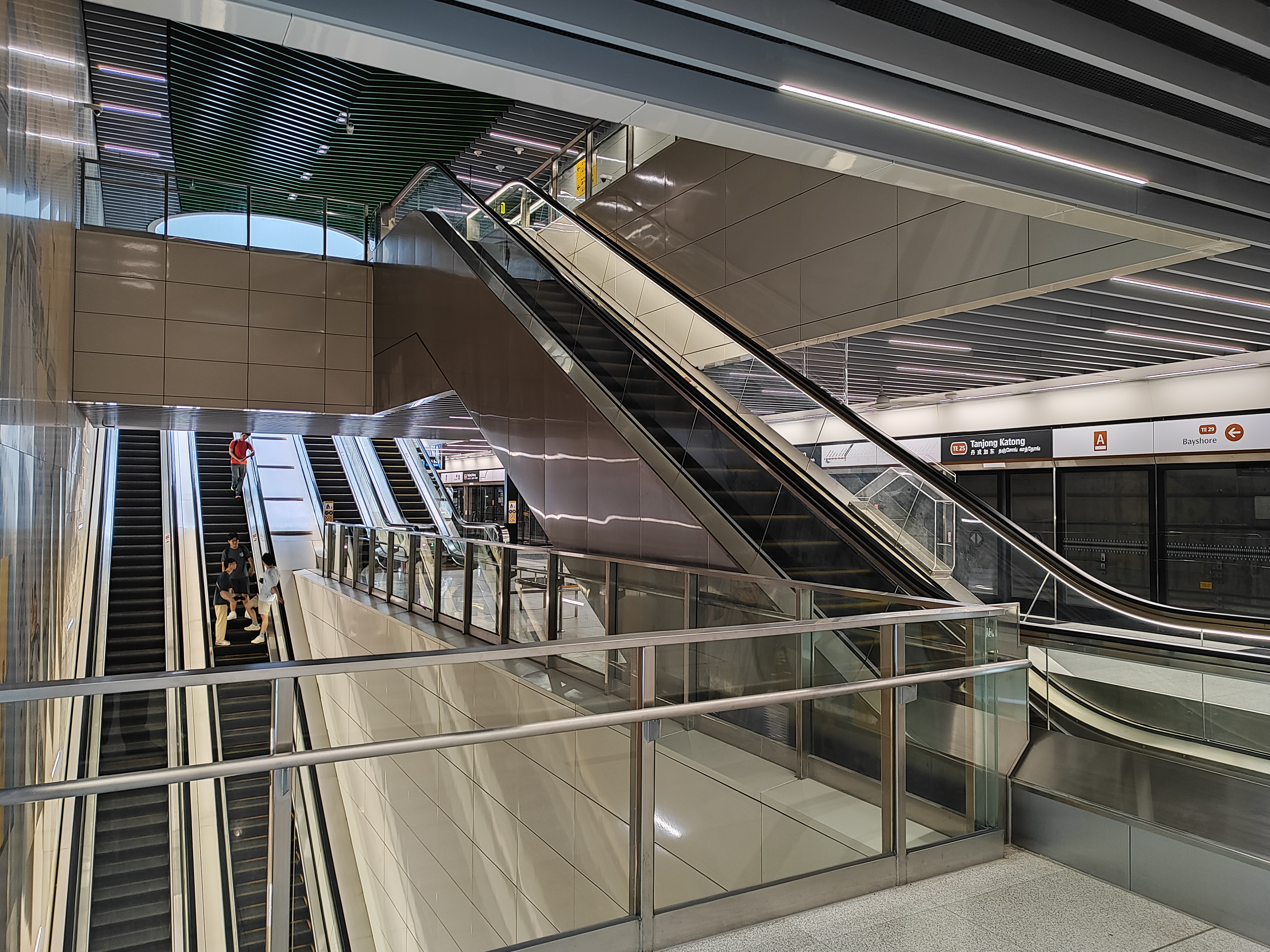
Set of escalators leading to different levels of the station

The Waters Are Blue, yet I Pine for You by Sim Chi Yin is displayed at this station as part of the Art in Transit programme, a showcase of public artworks on the MRT network. The artwork, which the title was derived from the first stanza of local folk song Di Tanjung Katong, is a 11.3 m (37 ft) collage on a three-storey wall near the escalators connecting the station's main concourse to the upper and lower platforms. To portray Tanjong Katong's past and memories, the work combines archival photographs with Sim's images of the present, superimposed over a photo of the former Big Splash water park. Other images depict the local swimming clubs in the area, Kampong Amber and the endangered Katong turtles. Sim had expressed interest in the area's "hidden histories" and used visual motifs to highlight gaps in the archives and official histories, which was a recurring theme in her work.

Another mural, Riding the Waves of Change by Tanjong Katong Girls School students, depicts the development of Katong from a Peranakan enclave to present urbanised neighbourhood. According to the students, the recurring motifs of the Katong turtle symbolises Katong's history and its "commitment to sustainability" as Katong "rides the waves of change". As a part of a collaboration between the National Arts Council and the LTA for Singapore Art Week 2025, Tanjong Katong station had the mural National Antiquities Parade by The Temporal Displacement Agency and the Mountbatten Community Arts and Culture Club. The mural portrays the Mountbatten Community playing with clay soldiers and reenacting the last National Day Parade held at the former Kallang Stadium.
