= Parkway Parade =

Coordinates: 1°18′07″N 103°54′17″E

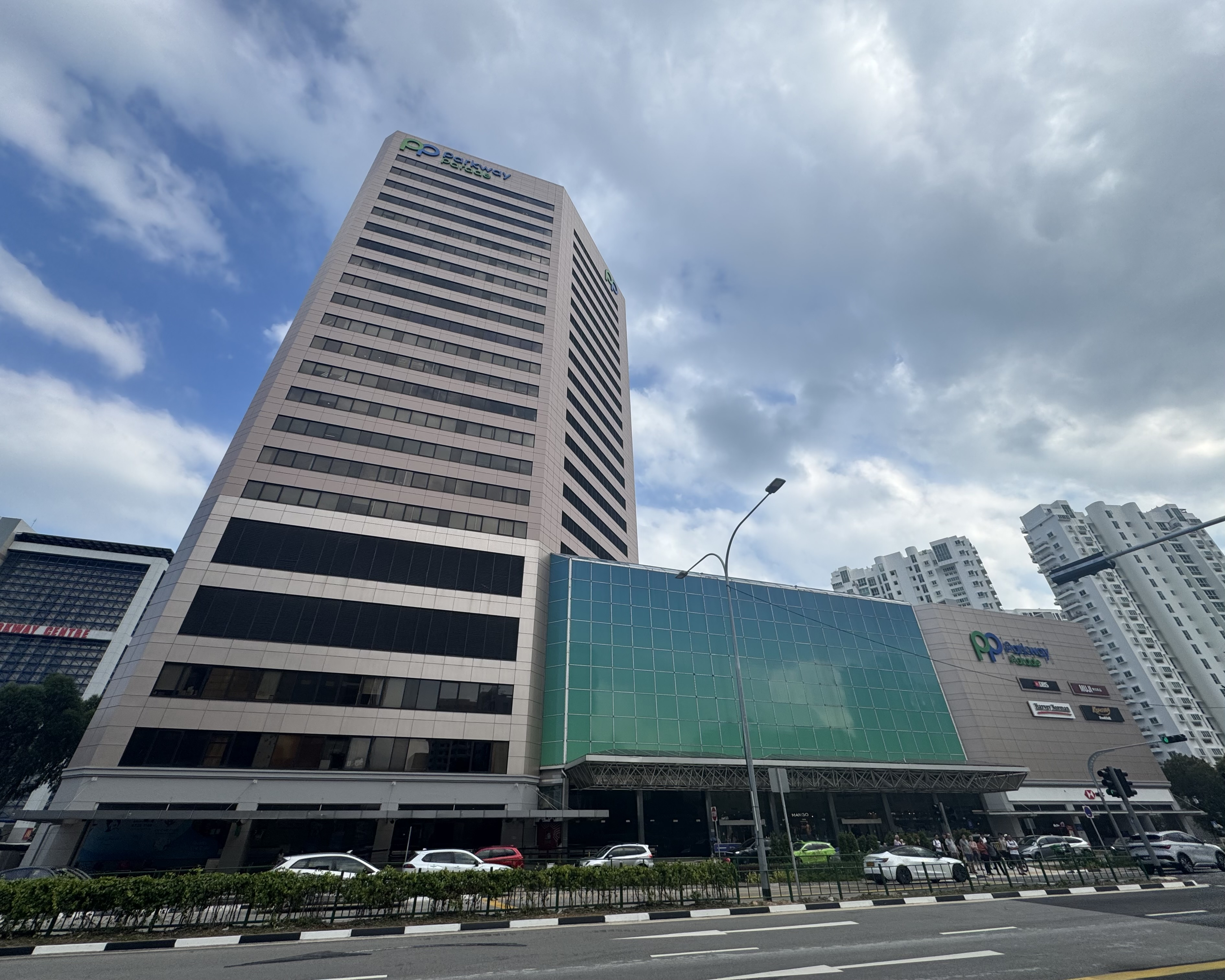
- Parkway Parade in 2026
- Location: Marine Parade, Singapore
- Address: 80 Marine Parade Road
- Opened: 20 December 1983; 42 years ago (Soft opening); 9 March 1984; 42 years ago (Official opening)
- Developer: Parkway Holdings
- Manager: Lendlease
- Owner: Mixed-use development with sub-divided strata ownership, owned by Parkway Parade Partnership Limited fund managed by Lend Lease
- Num. of stores: 270
- Num. of anchor tenants: FairPrice Xtra; CS Fresh; Kopitiam Food Hall; Daiso; Muji; Best Denki; Harvey Norman; Toys 'R' Us
- Floor area: 565,697 square feet (52,555.0 m^{2})
- Floors: 7
- Parking: 1,184 (incl. 16 family, 12 handicap and 8 green lots)
- Public transit: TE26 Marine Parade
- Website: www.parkwayparade.com.sg

Parkway Parade is a suburban shopping centre in Marine Parade, Singapore. Officially opened in March 1984, it has a 22-floor office tower and a seven-storey shopping mall with a basement. Developed by Parkway Holdings, the company sold the building to Asia Pacific Investment Company in 2000. The mall is managed by Lendlease.

== Building ==
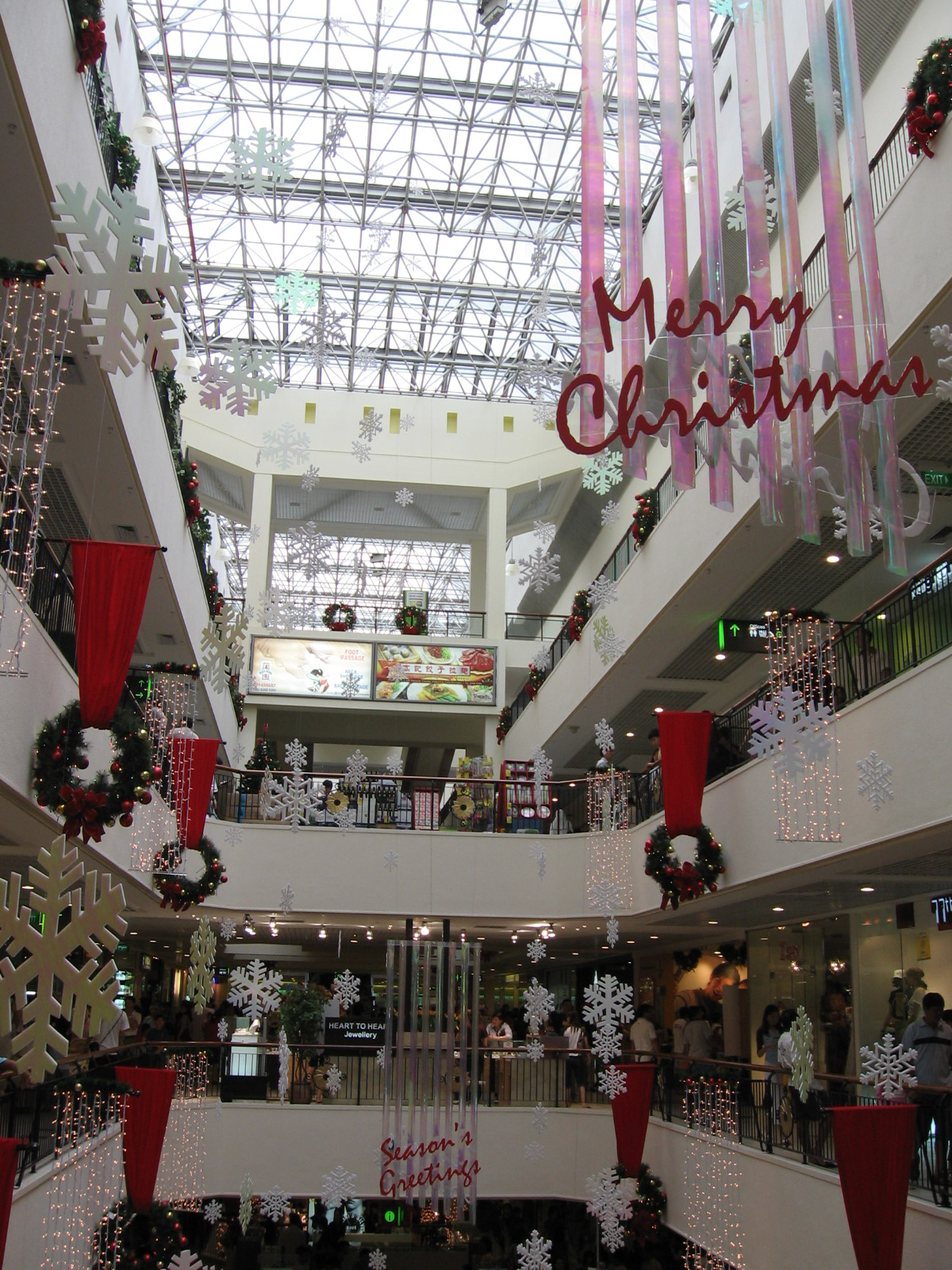
Parkway Parade Shopping Centre during the 2005 Christmas season

The development of Parkway Parade began in March 1981. Developed by Parkway Holdings on a 31,536 square metres (339,450 sq ft) plot along Marine Parade Road, the complex comprised a 15-storey office building and a six-storey shopping podium, and was expected to cost S$250 million. The mall was designed after American suburban shopping centres, and Parkway Holdings sought advice from American and Australian consultants for its design. In order to meet an Urban Redevelopment Authority deadline, the building contractor, Kajima Corporation, used a proprietary flat-slab construction technique to construct the complex.

The complex opened in December 1983, and was well-patronised by shoppers, according to The Straits Times. Having cost S$280 million to build, Parkway Parade had over 120,000 square metres (1,300,000 sq ft) of shop space, and featured several department stores catering to the middle class. It also has a medical centre situated on the fourth and fifth floor of the building.

=== History ===
At the time of its completion, Parkway Parade was one of the first suburban shopping malls in Singapore. It featured many major tenants setting up their stores in the suburbs for the first time, such as Isetan, Marks & Spencer, Best Denki (then known as Yaohan Best), children's department store Small World and MPH Bookstore. It also featured a wide array of food choices, including a Chuck E. Cheese's Pizza Time Theater that was open from December 1983 to 1984-1986 (located inside Small World), Hardee's and Petite Park, and also had a mini theme park occupying Levels 3 and 4 (Funland), and a playground at Level 7, which was the first and largest mall playground in Singapore at that time. The mall was also home to the second Singapore outlet of Border's bookstore in 2007, together with Dôme Cafe sharing a portion of its floor space.

In 1992, Weekend East claimed that Parkway Parade was one of the most successful malls in Singapore, with 12 million visitors annually.

In 2000, the property was sold to Asia Pacific Insurance Company, and subsequently Lendlease was appointed to manage the mall.

In 2004, British multinational department store company Marks & Spencer opened a store at the mall.

Further facelifts were done to mall's exterior featuring an expanded alfresco-dining to the first floor in 2011, with the removal of the 'Waterfall' leisure feature and repositioning of the mall's entrance area. Completed in end 2012, the new alfresco-dining area houses around 10 new tenants to the expansion, which includes Din Tai Fung, PappaRich and Twelve Cupcakes.

A seven-screen Cathay Cineplex once opened back in September 2017, taking over the former True Fitness space at Level 7, and ceased operations in August 2023. As of 2025, the space has since been taken up by enrichment centres Releve Gym and Dance, Scholar Basketball Academy and Think Academy.

Giant ceased operations after an 18-year tenancy at Parkway Parade in February 2020, with FairPrice Xtra coming in as an anchor tenant that opened thereafter in 2021. Isetan has ceased operations in late January 2022 after 38 years in operation and Parkway Parade had undergone a small refurbishment works with Muji taking over.

In 2025, Marks & Spencer closed their store after 20 years, citing "ongoing effort to refine its store portfolio and focus on key locations and the online business in Singapore". It was further reported by The Straits Times that various stores such as restaurant chain Putien, Treasures Yi Dian Xin, Dyson’s demo store, convenience store 7-Eleven had closed down in the past one year. Other tenants cited possible reasons such as rental increase as high as 30 percent and inconvenience caused with the construction of new linkway between Marine Parade MRT station and the mall located at the basement, which is expected to complete by 2027.

The Kopitiam Food Hall, which opened in the shopping mall’s basement in March 2025, has internationally recognized food brands and a bar serving cocktails. It features the Michelin Bib Gourmand HJH Maimunah. Established in the 1990s, the stall serves a mix of Malay and Indonesian nasi padang dishes. The Michelin-recognised Putien also opened Putien Mini.
