= Katong Park MRT station =

Mass Rapid Transit station in Singapore

Katong Park TE24 加东公园 காத்தோங் பார்க்
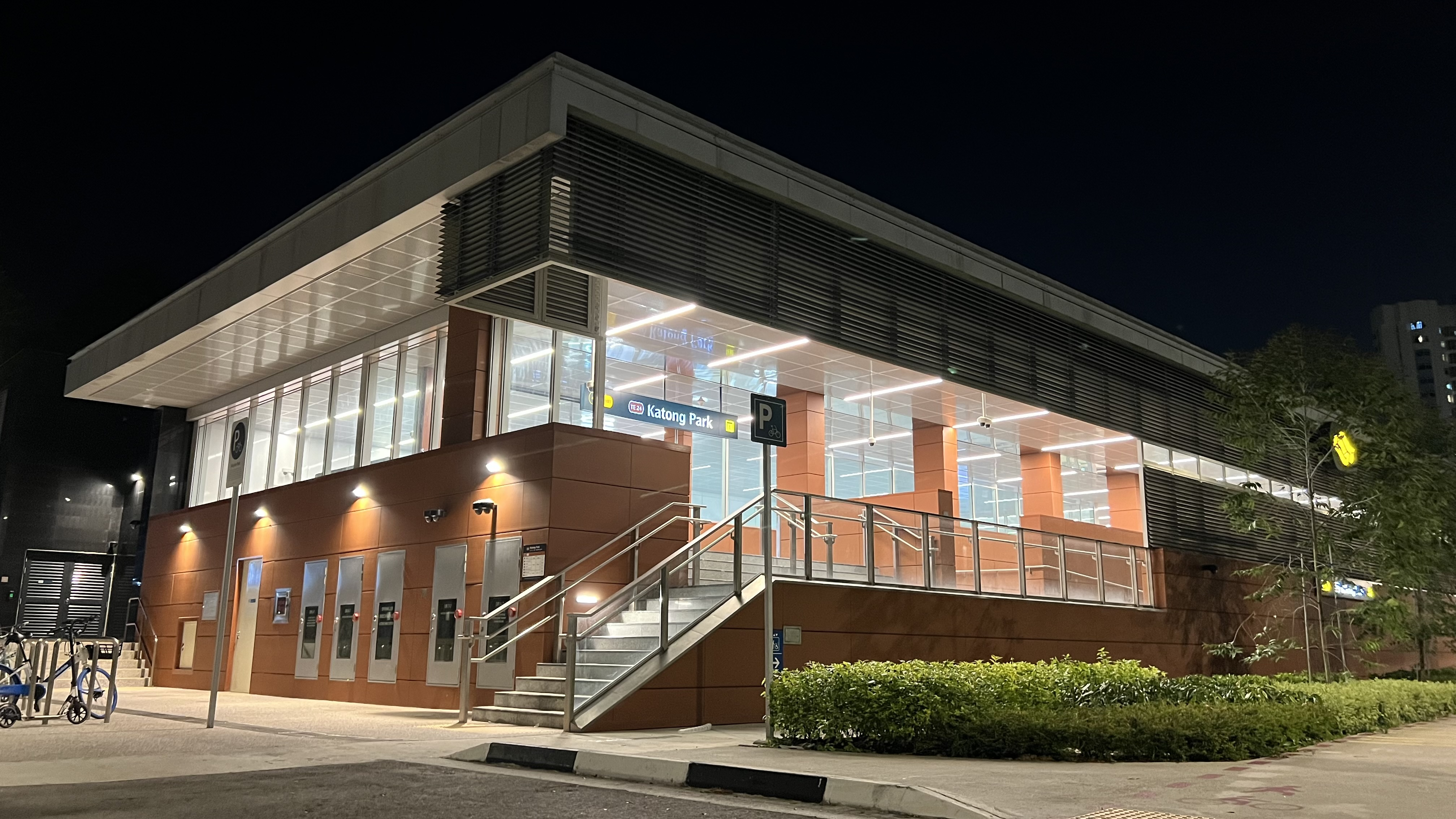
- Exit 1 of Katong Park station

General information
- Location: 45 Meyer Road, Singapore 437870
- Coordinates: 01°17′52″N 103°53′07″E
- System: Mass Rapid Transit (MRT) station
- Owner: Land Transport Authority
- Operator: SMRT Trains
- Line: Thomson–East Coast Line
- Platforms: 2 (2 stacked platforms)
- Tracks: 2
- Connections: Bus, Taxi

Construction
- Structure type: Underground
- Depth: 26.8 metres (88 ft)
- Platform levels: 2
- Accessible: Yes

Other information
- Station code: KTP

History
- Opened: 23 June 2024; 2 years ago
- Former names: Fort Road

Services
Preceding station	Mass Rapid Transit	Following station
Tanjong Rhu towards Woodlands North	Thomson–East Coast Line	Tanjong Katong towards Bayshore
Track layout
Location
- Location within Singapore Rail central area

Katong Park MRT station is an underground Mass Rapid Transit (MRT) station on the Thomson–East Coast Line (TEL). Situated along Meyer Road and adjacent to Katong Park, the station serves Dunman High School and Singapore Swimming School alongside nearby residential developments. The station is operated by SMRT Trains.

The station was first announced in 2014 and was constructed as part of TEL Phase 4. Constructed in a narrow site, the tunnels had to be stacked with the launch site situated away from the station. The station commenced operations on 23 June 2024. Featuring large skylights that naturally illuminate the upper concourse, Katong Park station has a depth of 26.8 metres (88 ft). An Art-in-Transit artwork Time After Time by Sit Weng San and Tania De Rozario is displayed at this station.

== History ==
On 15 August 2014, the Land Transport Authority (LTA) announced that Katong Park station would be part of the proposed Thomson–East Coast Line (TEL). The station would be constructed as part of Phase 4 (TEL4), consisting of eight stations from Tanjong Rhu to Bayshore.

External Image
- Artist's impression of Katong Park station's interior and exterior Source: LTA

The contract for the design and construction of Katong Park station was awarded to Shanghai Tunnel Engineering Co. (Singapore) Pte Ltd for S$293 million (US$212.09 million) in January 2016. Construction was scheduled to commence in that year with a targeted completion date of 2023. The construction of the 3.6-kilometre (2.2-mile) bored tunnels required the use of 6.35-metre (20.8 ft) diameter Earth pressure balance (EPB) machines.

The station was constructed in a narrow site along Meyer Road, surrounded by residential developments and the historical Katong Park. As the tunnels would be stacked to overcome space constraints, the station has a stacked platform layout. The contractors had to construct the tunnel launch shaft away from the station site to an empty area adjacent to Singapore Swimming Club. The contractors excavated the station box after the completion of tunnelling works. The soil conditions at the station is mostly soft marine clay due to its location in reclaimed land. The ground was strengthened with the diaphragm walls extending to a depth of 65 metres (213 ft), below the station box which is only 28 metres (92 ft).

The noise barrier south of the station site was removed in July 2021. With restrictions imposed on construction due to the COVID-19 pandemic, the TEL4 completion date was pushed by a year to 2024. On 5 March 2024, the LTA announced that the station would open on 23 June that year. An open house for the TEL4 stations was held on 21 June, with a booth for SportSG set up at this station.

== Station details ==
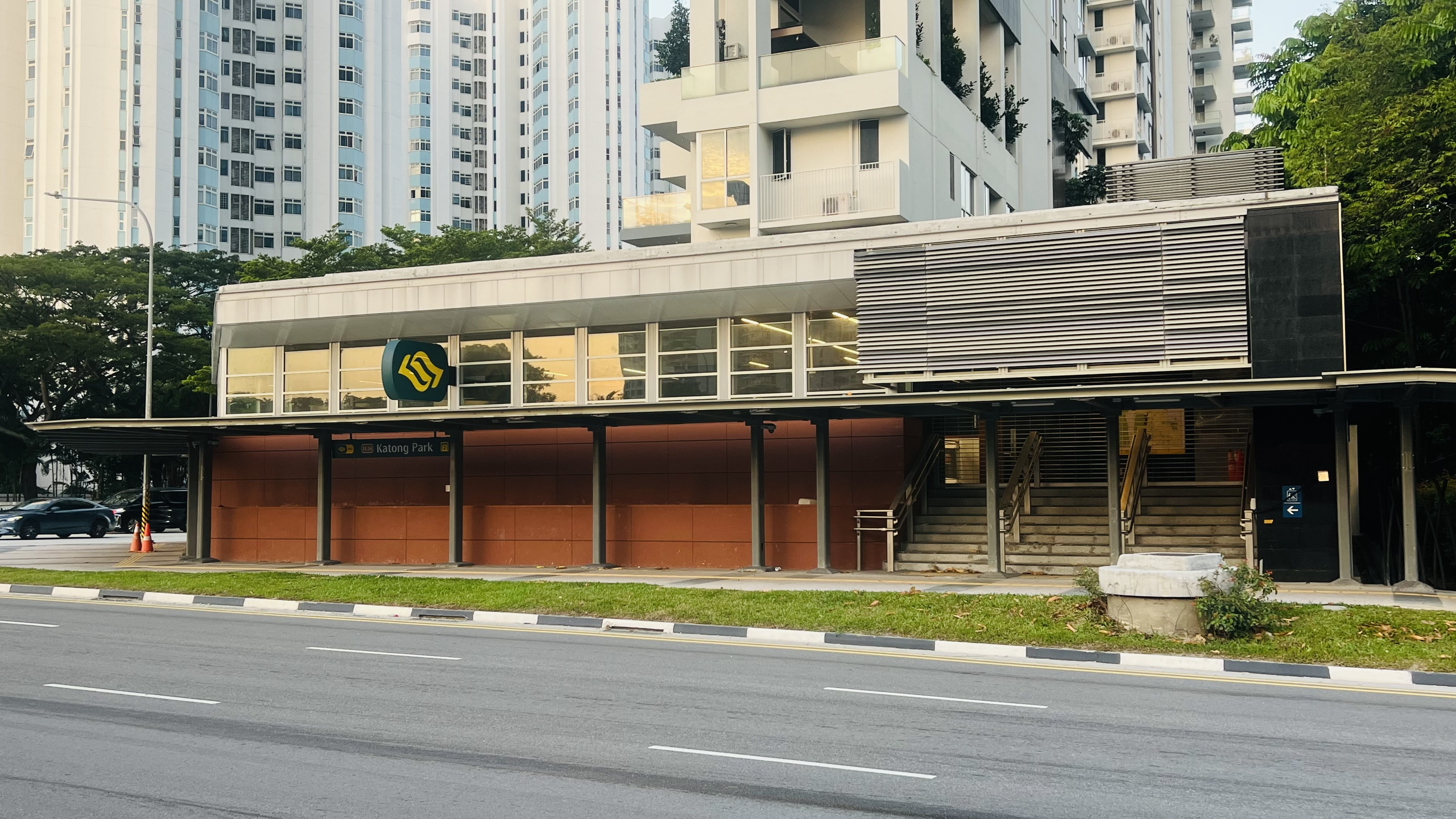
Exit 2 of Katong Park station

Katong Park station serves the TEL and is between Tanjong Rhu and Tanjong Katong stations, with the official station code of TE24. As part of the TEL, the station is operated by SMRT Trains. Located along Meyer Road near the junction of Fort Road and Tanjong Rhu Road, the station serves nearby condominiums such as The Belvedere, The Line @ Tanjong Rhu and The Meyer Place. Other nearby landmarks include Katong Park, Dunman High School, Katong Community Centre and Singapore Swimming School.

The station has a stacked platform layout, and has a depth of 26.8 metres (88 ft). The upper concourse of the station is naturally illuminated by large skylights. Like the other TEL4 stations, hybrid cooling fans at the platform complement the station's air-conditioning to improve air circulation yet lower energy consumption.

Time After Time by Sit Weng San and Tania De Rozario is displayed at this station as part of the Art-in-Transit programme – a showcase of public artworks on the MRT network. The artwork is a set of photographs depicting the present-day Katong Park, with historical photos of the park superimposed on each. Drawing upon the park's history as a military fort and later a swimming spot, the work seeks to explore themes of "memory, archaeology, time, and the body", connecting the past and present and blurring the boundaries between them.

Platform on different levels

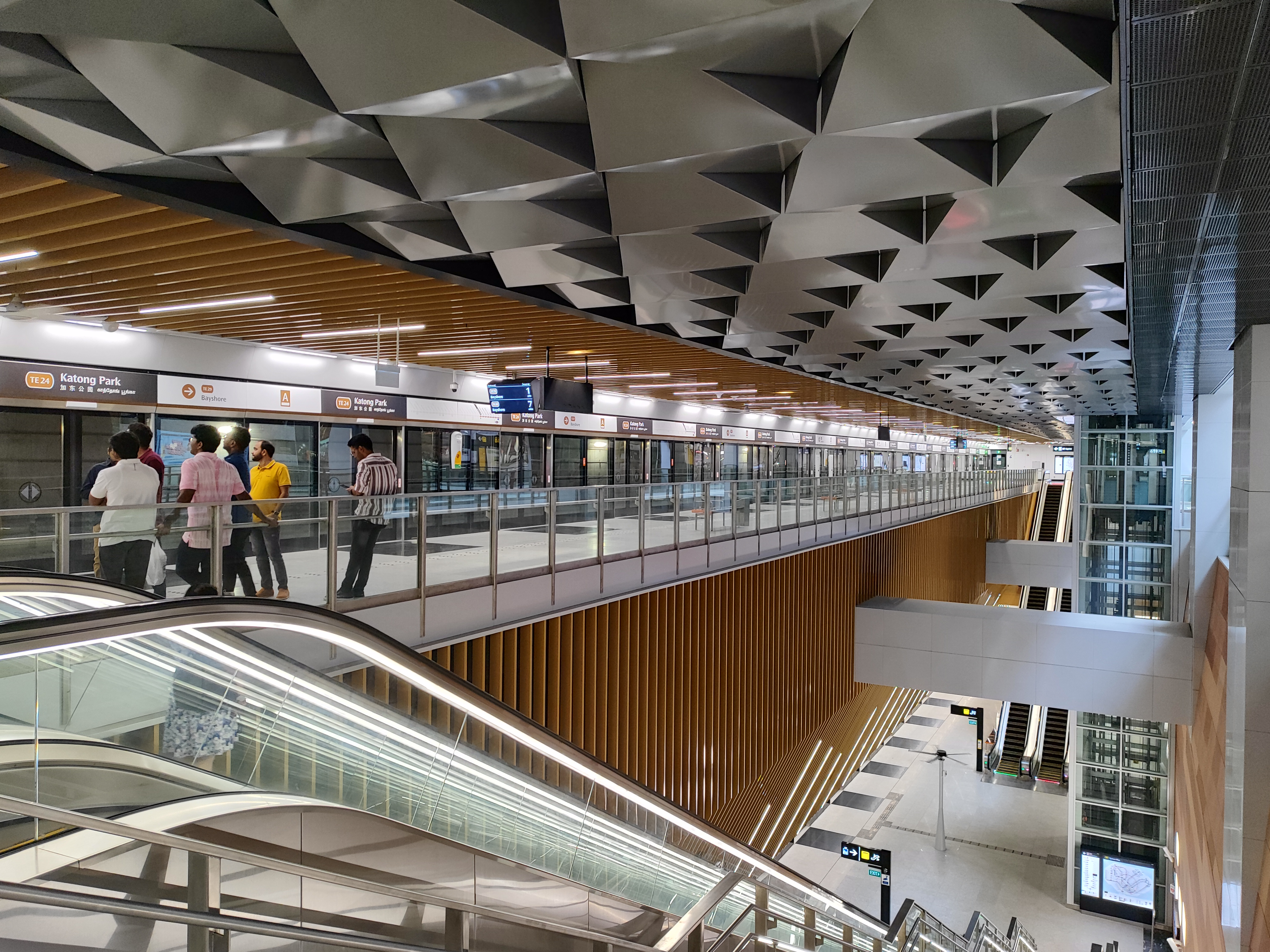
Platform A (upper)

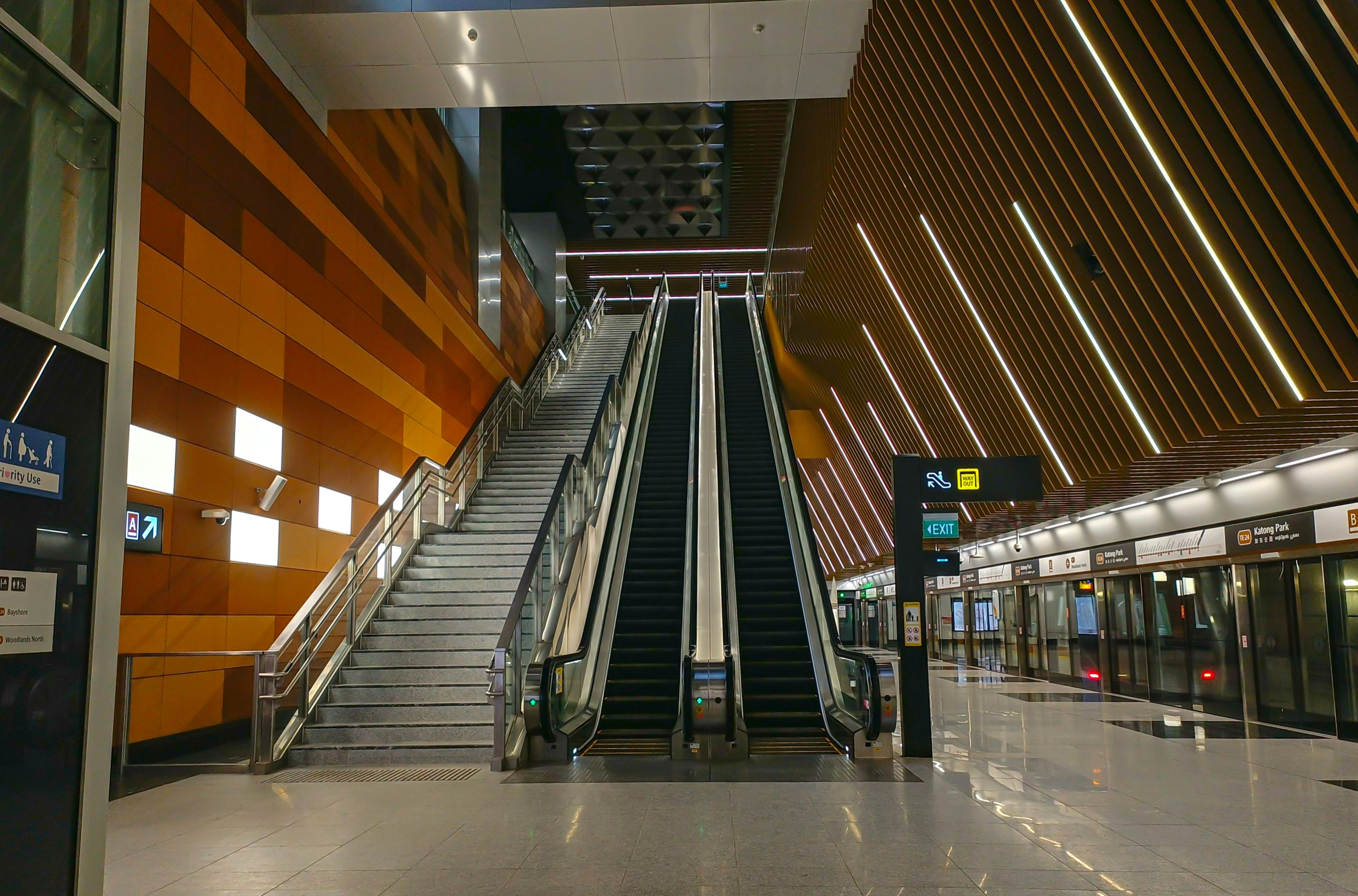
Platform B (lower)
