= Fort Tanjong Katong =

Colonial Singapore defensive structure

- Kubu Tanjong Katong 加东堡垒
- Singapore
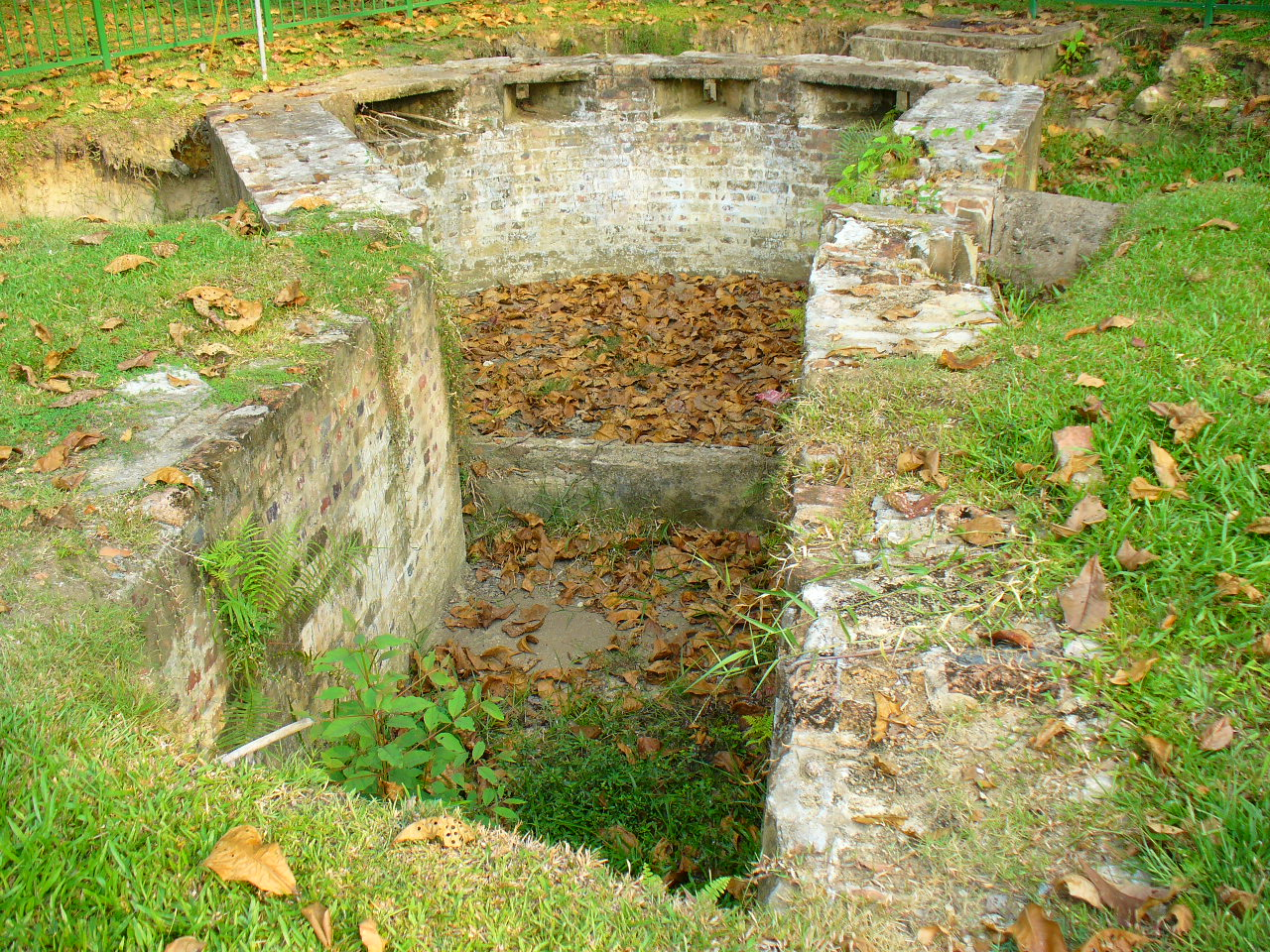
- The excavated site of the south-eastern bastion of Fort Tanjong Katong at Katong Park, circa August 2006. The structure, part of the fort built by the British in 1879, was likely positioned to help soldiers get a good shot at lurking enemies

Site information
- Type: Fortress
- Open to the public: Yes
- Condition: Mostly buried

Location
- Coordinates: 1.2972732°N 103.8865986°E

Site history
- Built: 1879
- Built by: Henry Edward McCallum
- In use: 1879-1901
- Events: 1885: Guns were upgraded 1901: First burial Late 1960's: Second burial 2001: Rediscovery; 2004: Excavation 2005: Reburial

Garrison information
- Garrison: Singapore Volunteers Artillery (SVA)

Fort Tanjong Katong was a military fort in Tanjong Katong, Singapore. The fort stood from 1879 to 1901 and was one of the oldest military forts built by the former British colonial government of Singapore. Located on what is now the junction of Fort Road and Meyer Road, it is currently located and displayed at Katong Park. The fort used be garrisoned by the Singapore Volunteer Artillery Corps (SVA).

Ideas to build defenses around the Tanjong Katong area were conceived as early as 1819, with a proposal in 1827 and subsequent proposals recommending to build a fort there, though it was not effectuated as it was thought that the sandy soil in the site was unsuitable. It was recommended by Governor of the Straits Settlement William Drummond Jervois in 1875 that Fort Tanjong Katong be built, with the fort built in 1879 to protect Singapore from foreign powers. After its completion, the fort was nicknamed "The Wash-out Fort" by locals due to the fort being constructed on low-level land, resulting in the batteries aiming to sea level. A tower was constructed to mitigate it but it made determining the target range for the guns hard as it was built on sand, resulting in the tower shaking when the gun was fired. In 1885, its three-gun battery was planned to be upgraded to 8 in (200 mm) guns. Five years after the upgrades were completed, there were calls to demolish Fort Tanjong Katong due to its poor structural design and remoteness. It was decided to abandon the fort in 1901, with most of the fort buried after World War I (WWI) except for a bastion, which was visible until the late 1960s, where it was reburied as part of land reclamations for the East Coast, resulting in the fort's site becoming part of Katong Park.

During a dry period, outlines of the fort were rediscovered in 2001. Excavation works began on 24 October 2004 with the Government decided to assemble a team of archaeologists to excavate the fort, which was possible via a community fundraiser. Found with traces of a moat and near intact perimeter wall, the fort was considered by local archaeological experts as one of Singapore's most important archaeological finds of a "true 19-century fort" to date. However, the fort was reburied by the National Parks Board (NParks) in December 2005 due to various concerns. There were calls to gazette the fort as a national monument, though this was rejected by the National Heritage Board (NHB) in May 2010.

== History ==
The SVA Gunners conducting a firing practice next to Fort Tanjong Katong around 1905

There were several mentions of defensive works in Tanjong Katong before Fort Tanjong Katong's construction. The earliest mention of such works was in a letter sent to Military Commander of Singapore William Farquhar from Stamford Raffles on 6 February 1819, where Raffles requested Farquhar to build batteries in the area, although it was not effectuated. In 1827, Captain Edward Lake of the Bengal Engineers proposed that a fortress with a vaulted chamber be built in Tanjong Katong and was similarly not effectuated. Subsequent surveys carried out by Captain Samuel Best also had similar recommendations. Captain Henry Yule also recommended for the fort to be built in August 1853, though it was revealed that the fort has not been built as the sandy soil at the site was thought to be "unsuitable". In 1864, the local defense committee urged for the Tanjong Katong battery to be constructed, where the governors asked for Fort Fullerton to be demolished and its land to be sold, with its proceeds going to the construction of the battery. In 1875, it was recommended by the Governor of the Straits Settlement Sir William Drummond Jervois that reforms should take place for Singapore's defense system, including building Fort Tanjong Katong.

=== Operation (1879–1901) and burials (1901–late 1960s) ===
Fort Tanjong Katong was designed and built in 1879 by Henry Edward McCallum of the Royal Engineers on loan from Hong Kong, with the battery constructed between March and September as well as a local team of contractors constructing the fort in less than 12 months. The fort reflected the British concerns that other European powers such as France and Russia might attack Singapore. (Note: Harfield notes that it was constructed in response to local merchants' concerns of threats of the East invading Singapore.) Fort Tanjong Katong was built, along with Fort Siloso, Fort Connaught, Fort Serapong, and Imbiah Battery, to guard the western and eastern entrances to the New Harbour (now Keppel Harbour). The fort's garrison included members of the Singapore Volunteer Artillery (SVA) that held regular gun drills and their annual training camps at the fort. In 1885, works began on upgrading the existing gun batteries in Singapore, and the three-gun battery at Tanjong Katong was replaced with a pair of more powerful and longer range Mark VII 8 in (200 mm) breech-loading guns.

After the fort's completion, it was nicknamed "The Wash-out Fort" by locals. As it was built on low-level land, it caused the guns to be situated at sea level. A high tower was constructed to mitigate this issue, though it was built on sand, resulting in the tower shaking whenever the guns were fired and thereby making it impossible to determine the target range. It was also later found out that the 8-inch guns had insufficient range to defend Singapore from sea threats and that it was hard to obtain ammunition for the guns as the guns were "unofficially" redirected to Fort Tanjong Katong. Five years after the gun upgrades were completed in 1888, it was debated between the Colonial Defence Committee in London and the Local Defence Committee in Singapore for Fort Tanjong Katong be demolished due to not enough personnel to staff the fort as well as the fort's remoteness, which made it difficult to transport water and reduced its effectiveness. On 31 December 1890, it was reported that one of the 8 inch gun batteries bursted upon firing, resulting in its muzzle blowing up. No casualties were reported. The fort was rendered obsolete and abandoned by the British in 1901 with its guns were removed. Instead of destroying the fort, the British thought it simpler to bury it, which was done sometime after World War I. However, a portion of a bastion was still visible above ground until the late 1960s, when it was buried as part of land reclamation works for the East Coast took place, and its memory was soon forgotten in the ensuing decades, with its site becoming part of Katong Park.

=== Rediscovery and excavation (2001–2010) ===
In 2001, a three-week dry period killed grasses in the fort's site, resulting in patches of rocks to appear. This prompted Katong resident Jack Sim to investigate it. Prior to the discovery Sim tried to find the fort when he moved to the area in 1993 after becoming interested in the etymology of Fort Road. It was not until 24 October 2004 when the ground was broken, starting the excavation. S$200,000 (2004) (US$118,327.21) was needed for the excavation, which was done by a community fundraiser named "Raising History, Planting Roots" initiated by the Mountbatten Citizens' Consultative Committee, where it encouraged local residents and schools to have ownership of local heritage. In just four weeks, the $200,000 needed was raised from corporate sponsors and a fund-raising dinner held at Suntec City on 27 September 2004.

External media
- Photo gallery of the excavation
- Compilation of media related to Fort Tanjong Katong, including plans, drawings, and photographs of the excavation

From 29 September 2004 onwards, it was reported that an average of 20 volunteers participated in the excavation led by a handful of archaeologists and archaeology volunteers named Southeast Asian Archaeology. Nearly 2 metres down, the volunteers uncovered significant remains of the fort still in situ—a pair of infantry bastions that did not appear in the original plans, the perimeter of the moat's inner escarpment and what appears to be the drawbridge superstructure. Experts call it "Singapore's only true fort"—one with protection all around—and it was considered one of Singapore's most important archaeological finds by The Straits Times.

As a result, an archaeology group lobbied for the site to be gazetted as a national monument. The archaeological dig at the former Fort Tanjong Katong site provided a unique opportunity for many Singaporeans to participate actively in uncovering the remains of the old fort. For nearly 10 months, more than 1,000 volunteers ranging from school students to housewives, retirees, working professionals on their off-days assisted the archaeologists on site and discovering first hand on the 125-year-old military fort. The Raffles Museum of Biodiversity Research, a natural history research unit of the National University of Singapore, assisted with the analysis of marine artefacts and corals that were uncovered at the site, and some 36 bags of samples have been deposited with the museum for further analysis.

As there were no plans for the next phase of the excavation, the fort was backfilled in December 2005 by the National Parks Board (NParks), which runs the park. It was done to protect the fort against the weather as well as to prevent mosquitoes from breeding and someone falling in the dug-out pits. The remaining funds, about S$150,000 (2006) (US$94,402.95), were redirected to bursaries and scholarships for the constituency students and PAP community foundation. In May 2010, the National Heritage Board has stated that it has no plans to gazette the fort as a national monument.

== Details ==
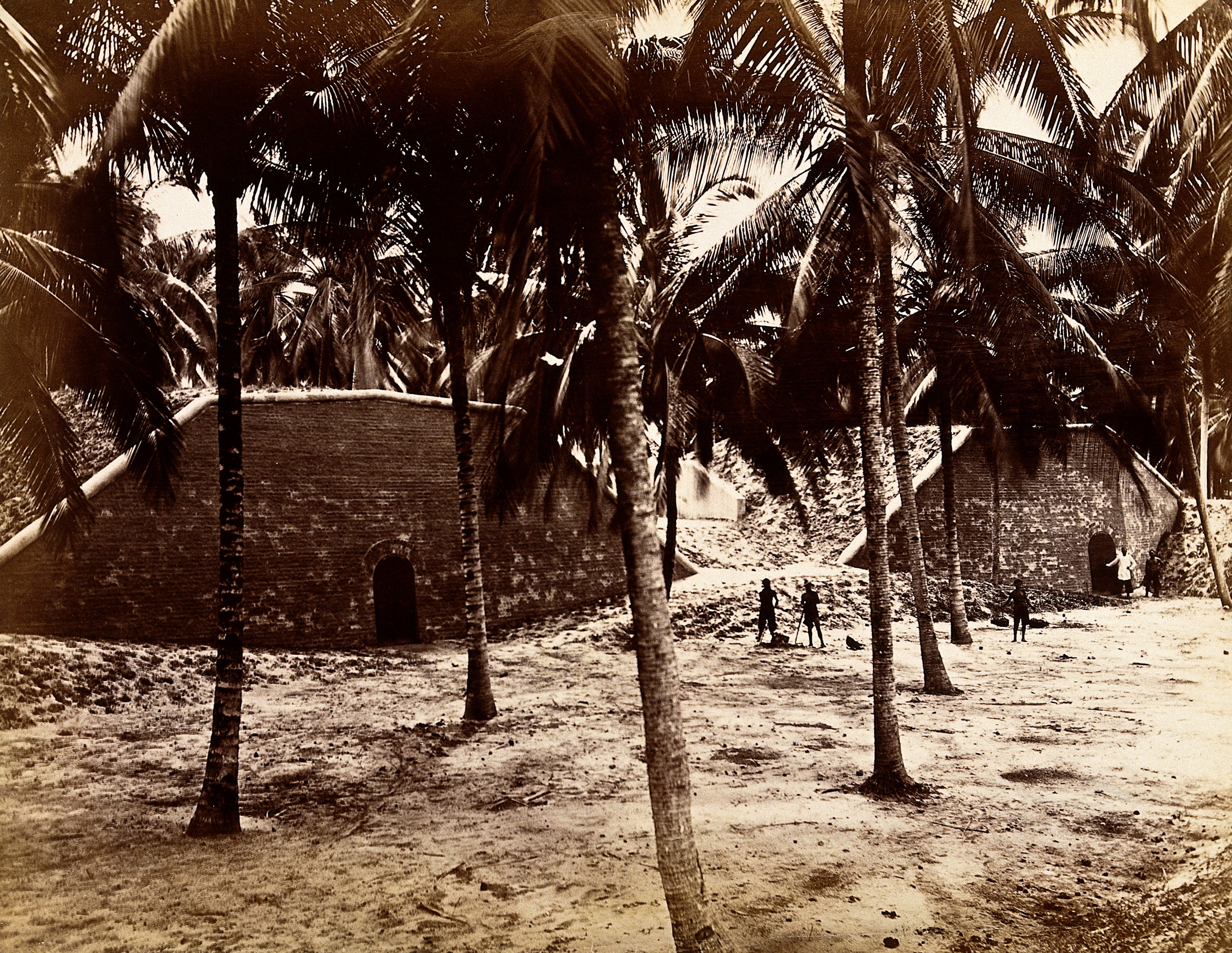
An 1880 photograph of Fort Tanjong Katong

One of Singapore's oldest fort, it is located next to Katong Beach on what is now the junction of Fort Road and Meyer Road. The fort gave its name to Fort Road, and it used to stand on the grounds of the present Katong Park. Fort Tanjong Katong, the only one of its kind on the eastern side of the island, was part of a series of defensive batteries and fortifications along the southern coast of Singapore, that defended the eastern approaches to the Singapore Harbour and Singapore Town against seaborne attacks. The fort sat atop a wet, low-lying coconut plantation and occupied an area of approximately two hectares, and had a small elevated battery of three 7 in (180 mm) rifled muzzle-loading guns facing the sea, along with bomb proof shelters. The battery was surrounded by a ditch measuring 100 feet wide on the flanks. To date, only the south-eastern bastion, which was nearly fully excavated, has been cordoned off indefinitely (the south-western bastion was left untouched).
