= Katong Park =

Park in Katong, Singapore

Coordinates: 1°17′48″N 103°53′11″E

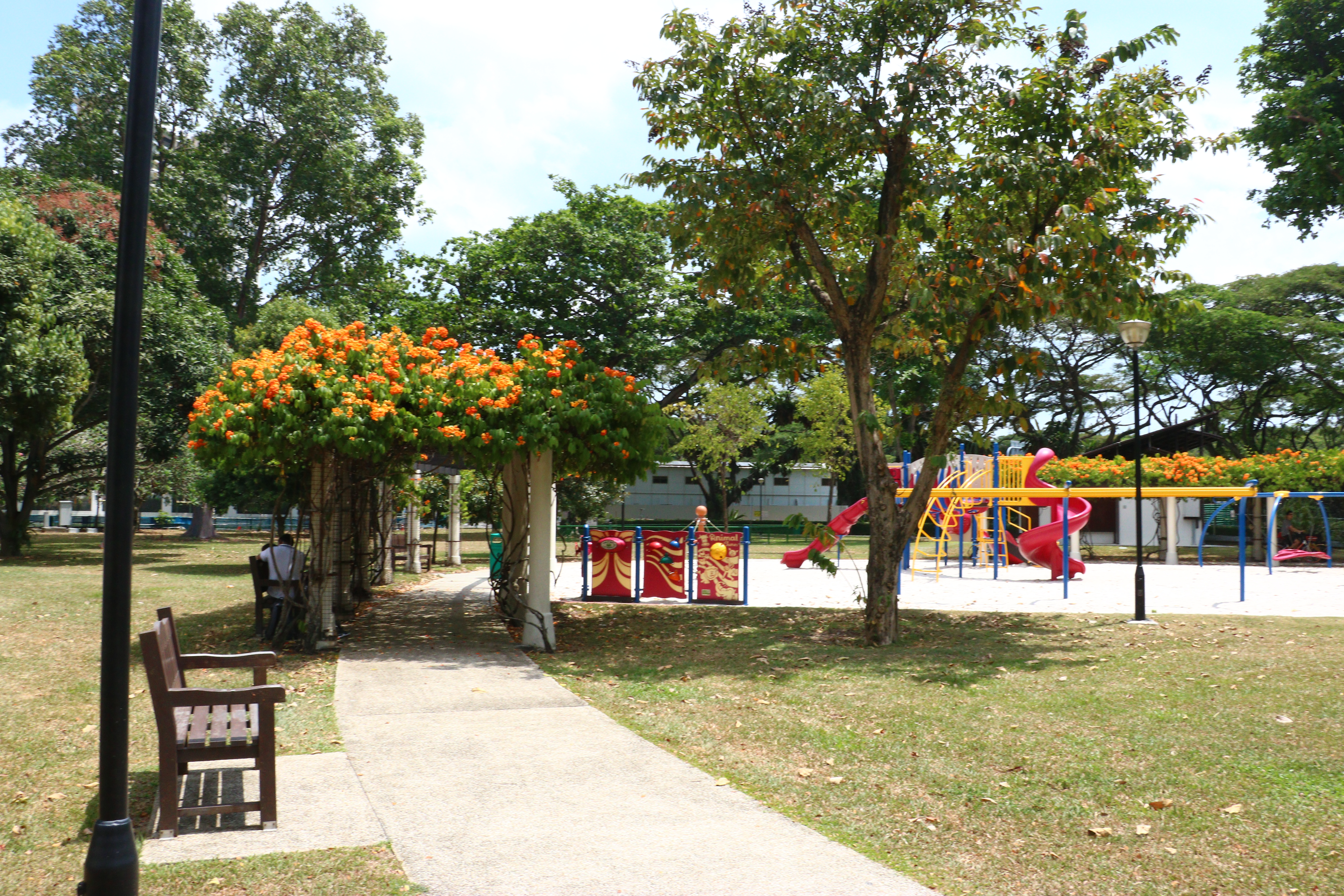
Katong Park. Construction hoarding for Katong Park MRT station can be seen in the background

Katong Park is a neighborhood park located in Katong, Singapore, at the junction of Meyer Road and Fort Road. Built in the 1930s above the buried remains of Fort Tanjong Katong, it was one of Singapore’s oldest parks with the first public bathing pagar (sea swimming enclosure) and was highly popular with families during the weekends. After the coastal reclamation works in the 1970s, the park lost its sea frontage and declined greatly in popularity. It now remains as a small community park serving nearby residents.

== History ==
=== Before the park ===
Fort Tanjong Katong, one of the oldest military forts built by the formal British Colonial Government of Singapore, once stood at the location of where Katong Park currently stands. It was built in 1879 to as part of a series of defensive batteries and fortifications along the southern coast of Singapore to defend against Russian invaders.

Swimmers were said to have came by sampan from Johnston’s Pier to bathe off the military pier off Katong Fort.

The fort was abandoned and buried in 1901 due to its poor structural design and remoteness. It was rediscovered twice, once in 1950 and again in 2001. Although they had known of the fort’s existence in 1950, it was only during improvement works in the park that the actual walls were discovered. One of the gun turrets was scooped out and turned into a toddler’s sandpit and there had been plans to outline the top of the walls but it was not carried out.

The walls were rediscovered again in 2001 by Mr Jack Sim, a Katong resident and founder of the World Toilet Organization. The fort has since been considered by local experts to be one of Singapore’s most important archaeological finds, being the only "true 19th century fort" to date . However, as of 2010, the National Heritage Board has stated that it has no plans to gazette the fort for the time being. The fort was mostly reburied with sand to protect it from the elements until a future decision is made.

=== Bathing pagar days ===
==== Construction ====
The park was first mentioned in the 1928 Straits Settlements Annual Report (SSAR) by Director of Gardens, Mr R.E Holttum, indicating that a plan for the layout of the park was submitted.

In the 1920s, there was an influx of Chinese and Indian immigrants to the Katong area due to the rapid growth of central Singapore. As there was limited land for expansion in the area towards Telok Blangah, many of them moved east towards Katong onto land that was freed up due to the fragmentation of plantations. Increased infrastructure and amenities were built to support the increased population.

Katong Park was opened on 19 December 1931 by W Bartley, President of the Municipal Commissioners. It was Singapore’s first public sea swimming enclosure, in contrast to other existing bathing pagars in the Katong area such as the Singapore Swimming Club and privately owned pagars of mansions.

Katong Park’s bathing pagar was 50 yards (~45m) in length and extended 100 feet (~30m) into the sea. The park also had a bandstand, changing rooms and a playground. Food was sold in the Silver Owl Cafe as well as by vendors along Meyer Road.

==== Japanese occupation ====
During the Japanese Occupation, mechanical testing bays were constructed to service aircraft engines from Kallang Airfield, overseen by Yasuda Butai. An old warehouse that existed before the war was also integrated into the factory. These bays were then used as rest sheds for the park in the post war years.

==== Events ====
Every weekend, a British military band would perform on stage. Events such as concerts and sea carnivals was also held at Katong Park. The sea carnival was held annually in conjunction with Police Week and included activities such as boat races, night markets and wayang performances.

The largest event held at Katong Park was Aneka Ragam Ra'ayat (People’s Cultural Concert), a series of government sponsored public concerts that aimed at promoting mutual understanding between different cultural groups. The concert were held at multiple locations throughout Singapore with performances by different ethnic groups, attracting large crowds.

==== Bombings ====
The park was so popular that it was targeted by the Indonesians during the Konfrontasi. A total of three bombs went off in September and October 1963. There were no casualties, with only property damage to nearby cars as well as the windows of the Ambassador Hotel opposite the park.

=== Decline in popularity ===
Land reclamation works along Singapore’s east coast began in 1966, lasting for over 30 years. Dubbed as the “Great Reclamation”, it added a 1,525 hectares tract along the southeastern coast of the island. Between 1966 and 191, 458 hectares of land and 9 km of sandy beach were added from Bedok to the tip of Tanjong Rhu.

With the loss of the sea frontage, the park decreased in popularity, although it was still a pleasant place to hang out. Eventually, the construction of the East Coast Parkway (ECP) expressway and extension of Fort Road to the Tanjong Rhu Flyover led to the demolition of many structures in the park. While the park is still functioning, many of the events and activities that took place during its heyday are no longer there and the crowd has since moved on to other parks. On 3 November 1998, Katong Park was designated as a historic site.

== Modern day ==
Currently, Katong Park is a neighborhood park under the care of NParks, with a playground and dog run area serving nearby residents. Although the old buildings from the seaside days are now gone, the main pedestrian paths that run through the park still remain.

Heritage boards depicting the history of site from the colonial era all the way to the modern day have been set up.

=== Excavation of fort ===
In 2004, the park received public attention as a team of archaeologists began excavation of the buried fort. The Mountbatten Citizens' Consultative Committee garnered support from local residents and schools to encourage ownership of local heritage. Funding for the excavation was raised from corporate sponsors and a fund-raising dinner, totalling to S$200,000.

Volunteer diggers found large portions of the fort still in situ, with portions that did not appear in the original plans. Over the 10 month dig, more than 1,000 volunteers from all walks of life assisted the archaeologists in their efforts.

A public exhibition featuring 10 student design schemes by architecture students from NUS was held on 8 January 2006, showcasing concepts and ideas for an interpretative and information center to promote discussion on what the future of Katong Park could be.

Despite their efforts in fund raising and excavating the fort, the dig was called off in 2005 and the remains were reburied to protect the remains from the elements as well as to prevent visitors from falling into the holes.

Funding for the dig was diverted to bursaries and scholarships for students in the constituency. Only a bastion of the fort remains exposed and cordoned off, with no immediate plans for what to do with it. The fort is still pending acceptance as a National Monument by the Preservation of Monuments Board and the Urban Redevelopment Authority.

=== Sculptures ===
Sculptures depicting the British and Indian Sikh guard stand in the park and were donated by Mr Jack Sim. They represent the multi-ethnic civil defence forces of Singapore in the 19th century.

=== Katong Park MRT station ===
Katong Park MRT station, a station along the Thomson–East Coast Line, was opened on 23 June 2024.

Proposals to integrate the fort and the MRT station were not undertaken and it is likely that the fort will remain untouched at least until the construction of the station is finished.
