= Marine Parade MRT station =

Mass Rapid Transit station in Singapore

Marine Parade TE26 马林百列 மரீன் பரேட்
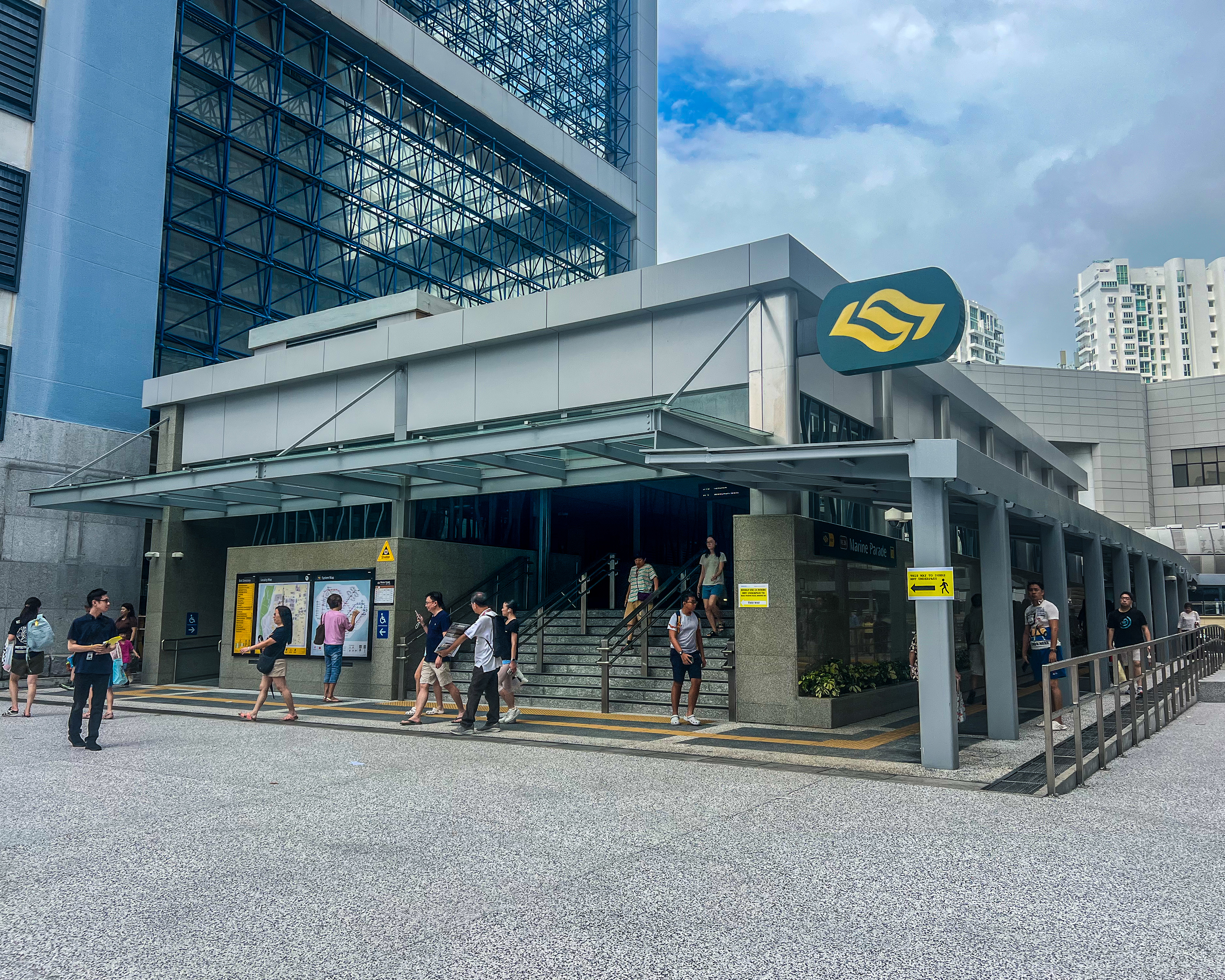
- Exit 1 of Marine Parade station

General information
- Location: 101 Marine Parade Road, Singapore 449971
- Coordinates: 01°18′09″N 103°54′18″E
- System: Mass Rapid Transit (MRT) station
- Owner: Land Transport Authority
- Operator: SMRT Trains
- Line: Thomson–East Coast Line
- Platforms: 2 (1 island platform)
- Tracks: 2
- Connections: Bus, Taxi

Construction
- Structure type: Underground
- Depth: 22 metres (72 ft)
- Platform levels: 1
- Cycle facilities: Yes
- Accessible: Yes

Other information
- Station code: MPR

History
- Opened: 23 June 2024; 2 years ago
- Former names: Marine Parade Central

Services
Preceding station	Mass Rapid Transit	Following station
Tanjong Katong towards Woodlands North	Thomson–East Coast Line	Marine Terrace towards Bayshore
Track layout
Location
- Location within Singapore Rail central area

Marine Parade MRT station is an underground Mass Rapid Transit (MRT) station on the Thomson–East Coast Line (TEL) in Marine Parade, Singapore. Located underneath Marine Parade Road, the station serves nearby residential and commercial developments including Parkway Parade, Roxy Square and I12 Katong.

First announced in August 2014, Marine Parade station was constructed as part of TEL Phase 4. The station commenced operations on 23 June 2024. The station is one of the first MRT stations to feature underground bicycle parking lots. An Art-in-Transit artwork, WALK by Ang Sookoon, is displayed outside of the station.

== History ==
=== Construction and opening ===
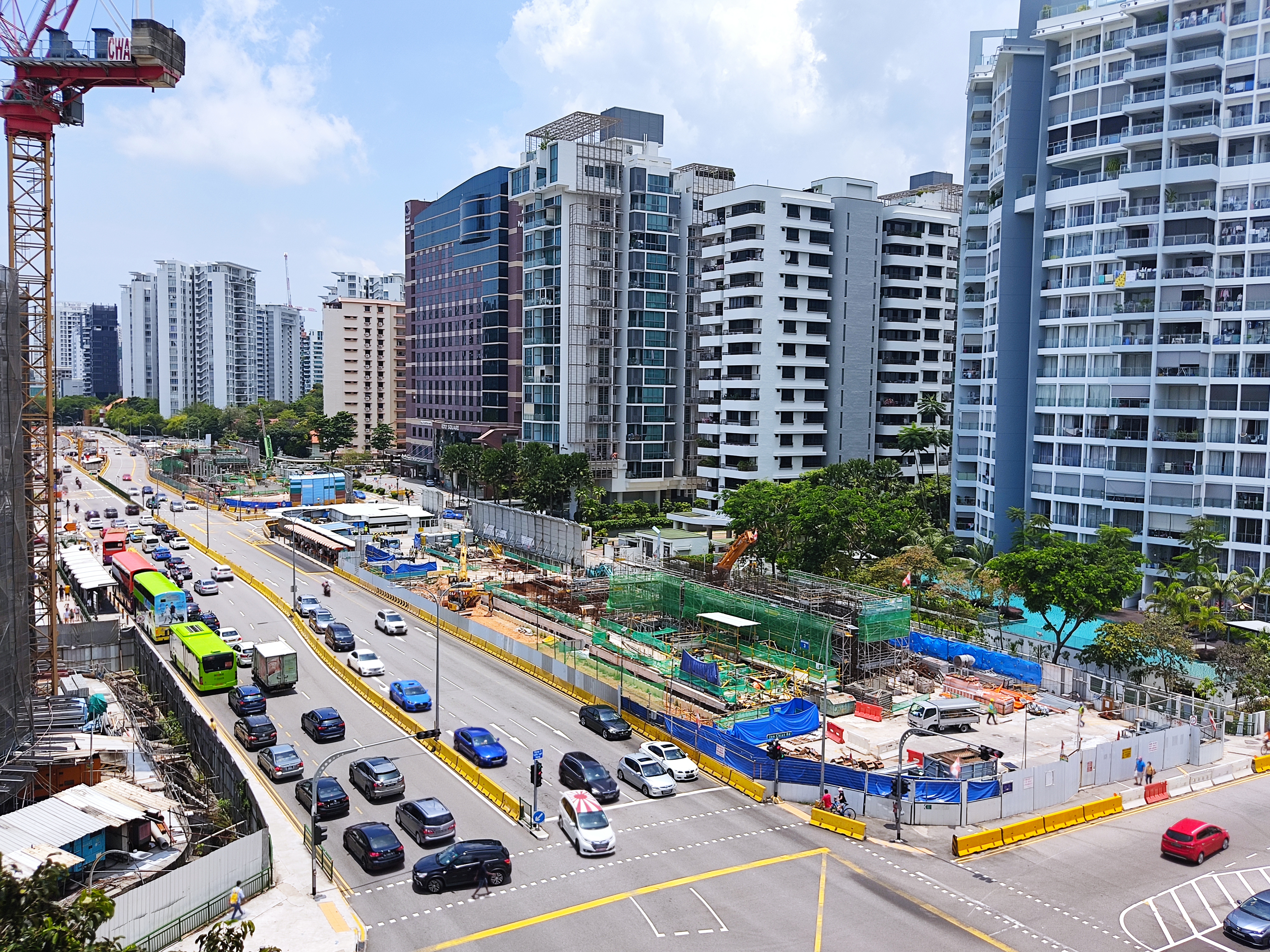
Construction site of the station in March 2022

On 15 August 2014, the Land Transport Authority (LTA) announced that Marine Parade station would be part of the proposed Thomson–East Coast Line (TEL). The station would be constructed as part of Phase 4 (TEL4), consisting of eight stations from Tanjong Rhu to Bayshore. The contract for the construction of Marine Parade Station was awarded to Samsung C&T Corporation for S$555 million (US$404 million) in November 2015. The works included the construction of a drainage system spanning 800 metres (870 yd) and 1.936 km (1.203 mi) of bored tunnels.

External Media
- Artist's impression of Marine Parade MRT station's interior and exterior Source: LTA

A groundbreaking ceremony for the TEL East Coast segment was held at the station site on 21 July 2016. To facilitate the station's construction, the junction between Joo Chiat Road and Marine Parade Road had to be closed from 9 April to 12 November 2017. This allowed for the diversion of underground utilities including water and power lines.

With restrictions imposed on construction due to the COVID-19 pandemic, the TEL4 completion date was pushed by a year to 2024. On 5 March 2024, the LTA announced that the station would open on 23 June that year. An open house for TEL4 stations was held on 21 June, and Prime Minister Lawrence Wong, along with former prime minister Goh Chok Tong, inaugurated the TEL4 stations at a ceremony in this station. The Reasons to Move Lite Gallery Exhibition and Friends of Land Transport Booth were set up at this station during the open house.

=== Subsequent developments ===
In 2025, some tenants at the nearby Parkway Parade shopping mall raised concerns about the construction of a linkway connecting the mall to the station, which began in December 2024 and would be completed by 2027. They questioned the reason behind the delayed construction of the linkway after the opening of the station instead of being simultaneously built with the station itself, and said that the prolonged construction period had impacted their business. Lendlease, which manages the shopping mall, said that the construction of the linkway was intended as a "subsequent phase to ensure coordination with relevant stakeholders and reduce the impact on shoppers and tenants".

== Details ==
Station features

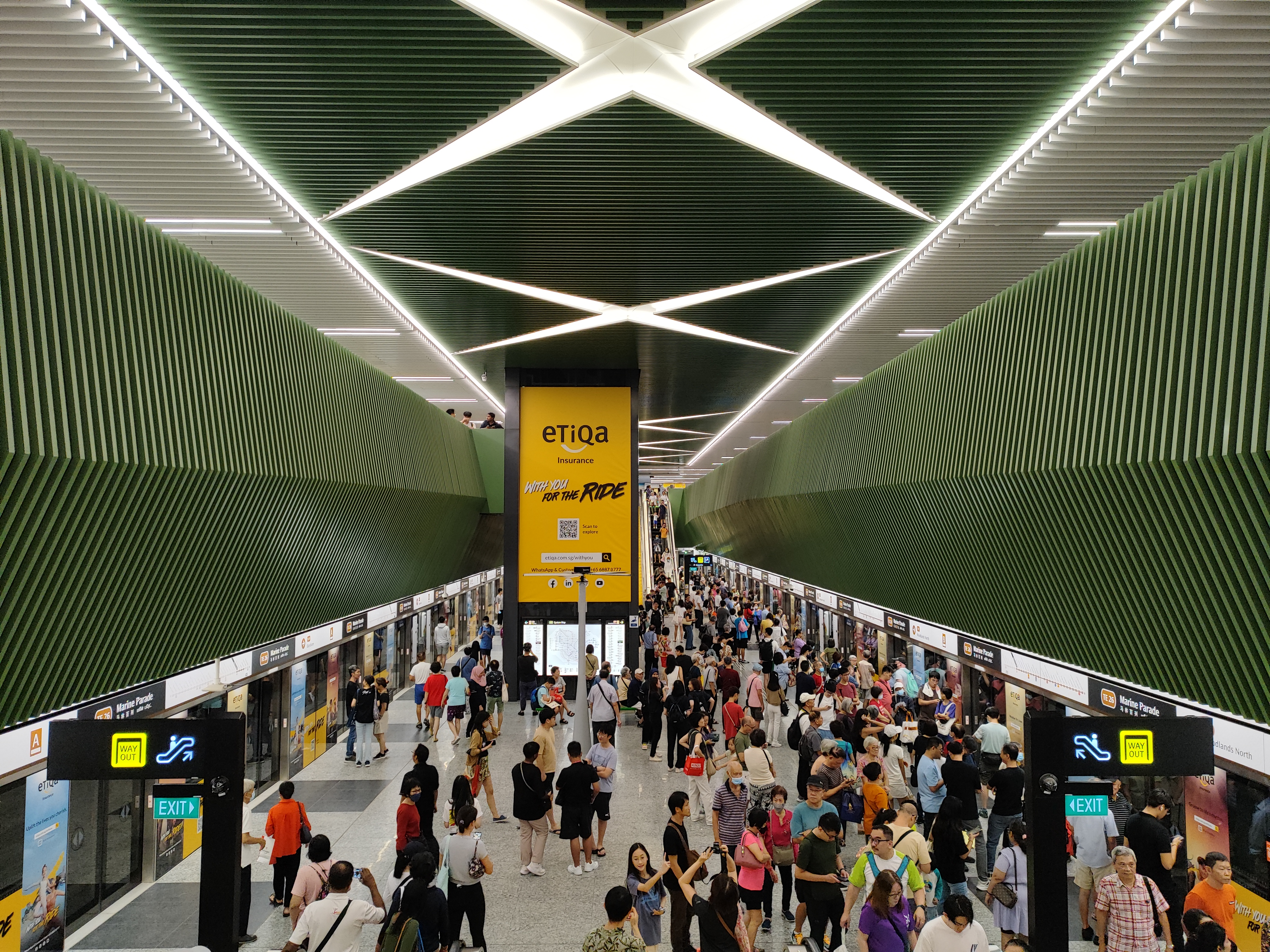
Station platforms, with the interior clad in green panels

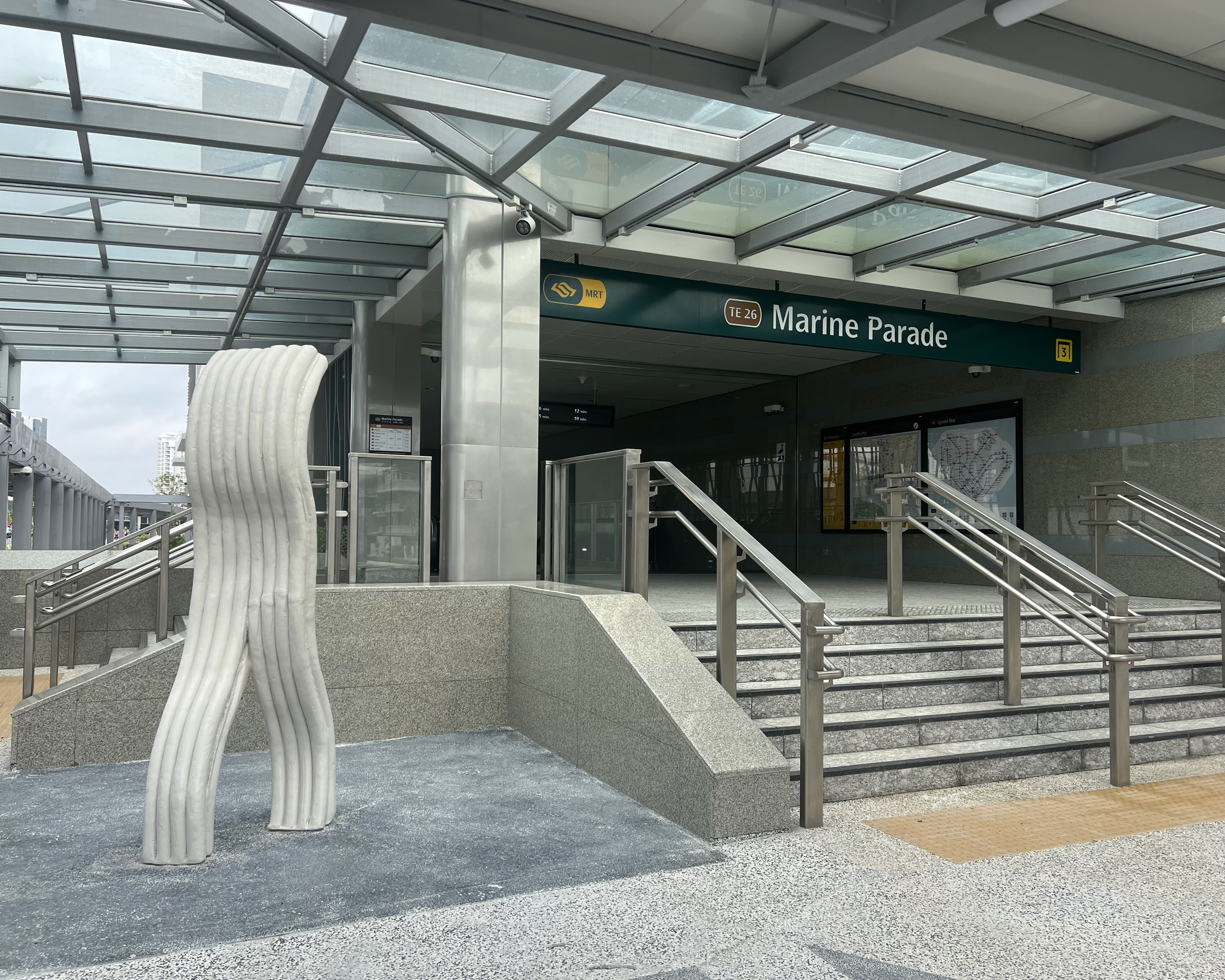
The Art-in-Transit artwork outside of the station

Marine Parade station is located between Tanjong Katong and Marine Terrace stations, with an official station code of TE26. Being part of the TEL, Marine Parade station is operated by SMRT Trains. Train frequencies vary from 3 to 6 minutes. The station has six entrances and serves various private and public housing estates in the Marine Parade area. Surrounding landmarks include Parkway Parade, I12 Katong, Roxy Square, Hotel Indigo Katong and the Marine Parade Community Building.

The station is built as a designated Civil Defence shelter. Marine Parade station is one of the first MRT stations to have underground bicycle parking spaces with 364 bike parking lots, and also features bigger lifts connecting from ground level to the parking space, and specially designed stairs to allow easier wheeling bicycles up and down the slopes. The station has an island platform configuration. Like the other TEL4 stations, hybrid cooling fans at the platform complement the station's air-conditioning to improve air circulation yet lower energy consumption. Inspired by the area's history as a former seafront, the station's green panelled interior resembles the trees of the beach and waves of the sea, with the star-shaped ceiling lighting reminiscent of sunlight filtering through the foliage.

WALK by Ang Sookoon is displayed at this station as part of the Art-in-Transit programme, a showcase of public artworks on the MRT network. Capturing "the essence of fluid tranquility", the 2.2-metre (87 in) bronze sculpture is shaped like a block of plasticine, and it is placed outside the station to interact with commuters. The work retains the marks left from its packaging and the artist's touch, bringing up childhood memories of crafting plasticine sculptures. Brought up in the Marine Parade neighbourhood, Ang intended for the work to be a playful tribute to the history of Marine Parade and those who lived in the area, while evoking childlike wonder and the delight of playful moments.

There is also a mural created by art group Mural Lingo. The mural depicts landmarks such as Parkway Parade, Marine Parade Community Building, shophouses, and the Joo Chiat Complex as well as characters from a separate mural at the Joo Chiat Community Club. It also showcases "the rich tapestry of the Katong/Joo Chiat community", which is composed of Chinese, Malay, Peranakan, Indian, and Eurasian influences.
