= Sim Chi Yin =

Singaporean photographer and artist

Sim Chi Yin is an artist from Singapore whose research-based practice includes photography, moving image, archival interventions, book-making and text-based performance, and focuses on history, conflict, memory and extraction. She has exhibited in solo shows in Europe and Asia, and her work has been shown in biennales and triennials.

Sim did her first two degrees in Cold War history and was active in the migrant worker rights movement in Singapore — using photography and media for advocacy — before becoming an award-winning journalist and foreign correspondent based in China for over a decade. Currently, she is in New York as a fellow in the Whitney Museum's Independent Study Program and is completing a PhD at King's College London.

She is working on a multi-chapter project around her family history and the decolonization war in Malaya, “One Day We’ll Understand” — most recently shown at the Istanbul Biennale 2022. Sim was commissioned as the Nobel Peace Prize photographer in 2017. Her work is in the collections of Harvard Art Museums, The J. Paul Getty Museum, M+ Hong Kong, Singapore Art Museum, and the National Museum Singapore. Sim is represented by Zilberman Gallery in Berlin and Hanart TZ Gallery in Hong Kong.

== Life and work ==
Sim was born in Singapore. She read history and international relations at the London School of Economics on a scholarship.

She worked as a print journalist and foreign correspondent at The Straits Times for nine years. In 2010 she quit to work full time as a photographer. Within four years she was working as a photojournalist, getting regular assignments from The New York Times.

Her first major work was "The Rat Tribe", about blue-collar workers in Beijing. It has been published widely and was shown at Rencontres d'Arles in 2012.

Sim spent four years photographing Chinese gold miners living with the occupational lung disease silicosis, published in the photo essay "Dying To Breathe", much of it about He Quangui, also the subject of a short film.

She was commissioned as the Nobel Peace Prize photographer in 2017 to make work about its winner, the International Campaign to Abolish Nuclear Weapons. Her photographs of similarities in landscapes related to nuclear weapons, both in the US and along the China-North Korea border, were exhibited at the Nobel Peace Center museum in Oslo, Norway.

In 2014 she became an interim member of VII Photo Agency, a full member in 2016 then left in 2017. In 2018 she became a nominee member of Magnum Photos.

As of 2018 Sim was a PhD candidate on scholarship at King's College London, researching British Malaya. She is married to Pulitzer Prize-winning journalist and writer, Ian Johnson, and they have a son.

== Publications by Sim ==
- The Long Road Home: Journeys Of Indonesian Migrant Workers. Jakarta: International Labour Organization, 2011. ISBN 9789221249955.
- She Never Rode That Trishaw Again. Sim Chi Yin Studio, 2021. ISBN 9789811811449.

== Short films ==
- Dying To Breathe (2015) – 10 minute film, directed and filmed by Sim
- Most People Were Silent (2017) – 3:40 minute film with audio soundscape, directed and filmed by Sim

== Awards ==
- 2010: Magnum Foundation Social Justice and Photography fellowship at New York University
- 2013: Finalist, W. Eugene Smith Grant in Humanistic Photography from the W. Eugene Smith Memorial Fund
- 2014: Her World Young Woman Achiever
- 2018: Chris Hondros Award from Getty Images and the Chris Hondros Fund
