= Thomson–East Coast Line =

Mass Rapid Transit line in Singapore

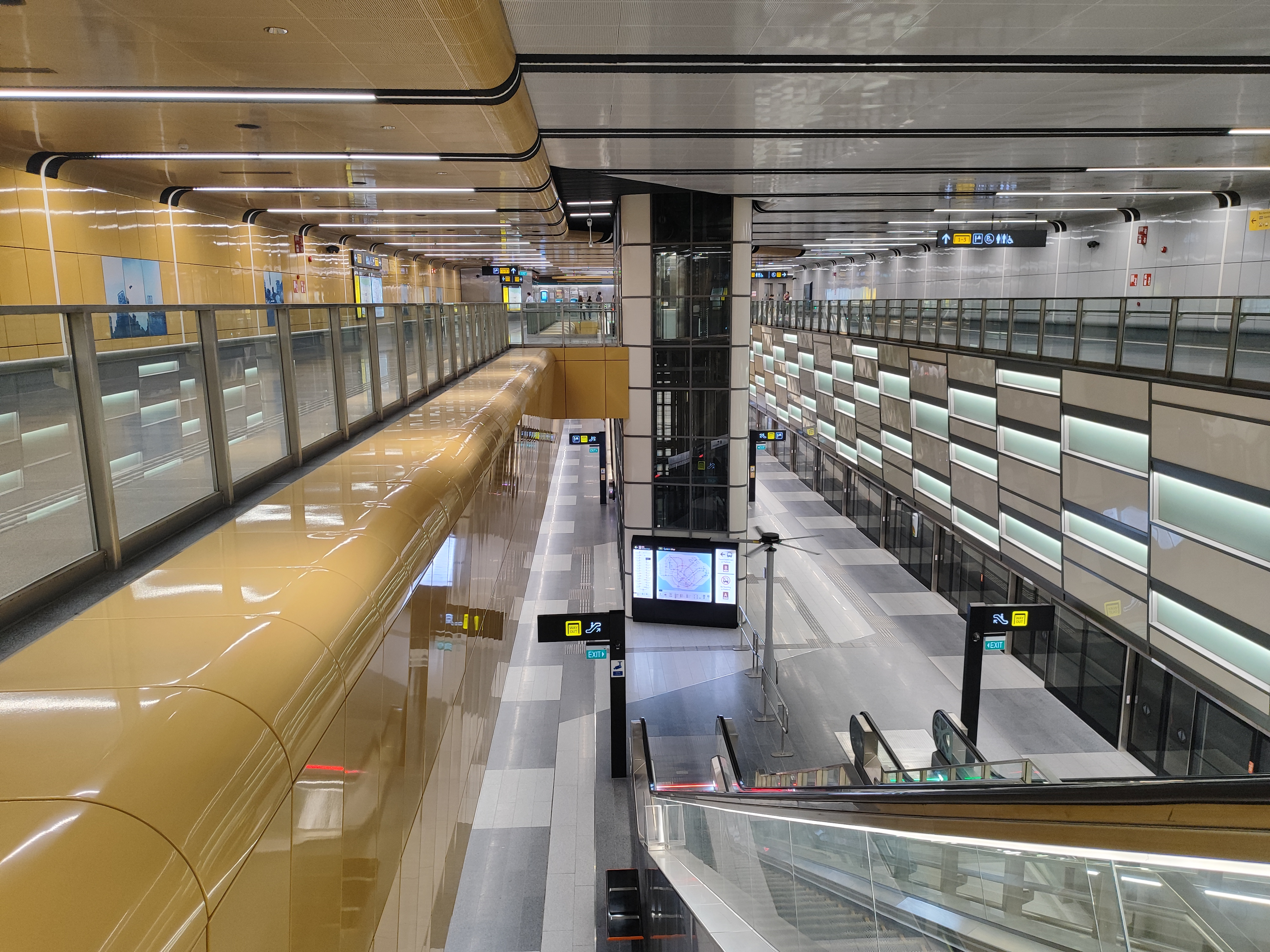
- Platforms of Bayshore MRT station, the current eastern terminus of the line

Overview
- Native name: Malay: Laluan MRT Thomson-Pantai Timur; Chinese: 汤申-东海岸地铁线; Tamil: தாம்சன் - ஈஸ்ட் கோஸ்ட் ரயில் பாதை
- Status: Operational; Under testing (Stage 5); Under planning (Extension to Tanah Merah)
- Owner: Land Transport Authority
- Locale: Singapore
- Termini: Woodlands North; Bayshore Sungei Bedok (26 December 2026) Tanah Merah (Mid-2030s)
- Stations: 37 (27 operational, 1 under construction, (Note: Changi Terminal 5 station) 2 under testing, (Note: Bedok South and Sungei Bedok stations) 3 unopened, (Note: Mount Pleasant, Marina South and Founders' Memorial stations) 3 under conversion, (Note: Changi Airport, Expo and Tanah Merah stations) 1 under planning (Note: Tagore station))
- Color on map: Brown (#9D5B25)

Service
- Type: Rapid transit
- System: Mass Rapid Transit (Singapore)
- Services: 2
- Operator: SMRT Trains Ltd (SMRT Corporation)
- Depot(s): Mandai; East Coast (Future)
- Rolling stock: Kawasaki–CRRC Qingdao Sifang T251
- Daily ridership: 160,000 (February 2023)

History
- Planned opening: 26 December 2026; 37 days' time (Stage 5); 2028; 2 years' time (Founders' Memorial MRT station); Mid-2030s (Extension to Tanah Merah)
- Opened: 31 January 2020; 6 years ago (Stage 1); 28 August 2021; 5 years ago (Stage 2); 13 November 2022; 4 years ago (Stage 3) (Note: Excluding Mount Pleasant and Marina South.); 23 June 2024; 2 years ago (Stage 4)

Technical
- Line length: 40.6 km (25.2 mi) (Operational); 16.4 km (10.2 mi) (Under construction, planning, testing or conversion)
- Track length: 40.6 km (25.2 mi) (Operational); 16.4 km (10.2 mi) (Under construction, planning, testing or conversion)
- Character: Fully underground
- Track gauge: 1,435 mm (4 ft 8 1/2 in) standard gauge
- Electrification: 750 V DC third rail
- Operating speed: limit of 90 km/h (56 mph)
Maps
Interactive Map

The Thomson–East Coast Line (TEL) is a medium-capacity Mass Rapid Transit (MRT) line in Singapore. Coloured brown on the rail map, it is the sixth line of the MRT network and is fully underground. When fully completed, it will be around 57 kilometres (35 mi) in length and serve 32 stations, becoming one of the world's longest driverless rapid transit lines. It runs along a combined north–south and east–west corridor, starting in the north at Woodlands town, passing through Upper Thomson and the towns of Ang Mo Kio and Bishan, heading south to the city centre at Orchard Road and Marina Bay, and subsequently heading eastwards along the eastern coast of the country through Kallang, Marine Parade, southern Bedok and Upper East Coast, before passing through Changi Airport and ending at Tanah Merah.

The line was first announced by the Land Transport Authority (LTA) on 15 August 2014, merging the previously planned and distinct Thomson (TSL) and Eastern Region (ERL) lines. By then, construction of the TSL had already begun in January 2014. The line is being opened in stages, beginning with Stage 1 (Note: From Woodlands North to Woodlands South.) on 31 January 2020. Stage 2 (Note: From Springleaf to Caldecott.) opened on 28 August 2021 and Stage 3 (Note: From Stevens to Gardens by the Bay.) opened on 13 November 2022. Stage 4 (Note: From Tanjong Rhu to Bayshore.) opened on 23 June 2024 while Stage 5 (Note: Bedok South and Sungei Bedok.) is scheduled to open from the second half of 2026. Meanwhile, Mount Pleasant and Marina South stations, which were structurally completed as part of Stage 3, remain non-operational due to the perceived lack of developments in their areas of service.

In January 2019, an infill station known as Founders' Memorial was announced to complement its namesake. Construction of the station began in 2019 and is planned to open in 2028. In addition, LTA also confirmed the integration of the Changi Airport Branch, which is currently part of the East–West Line (EWL), into the TEL. When fully opened, it is expected to serve about 500,000 commuters daily in the initial years before rising to one million in the long-term. It is the fourth MRT line to be operated by SMRT Trains Ltd and also the fourth to be completely automated and driverless. The line is currently served by Mandai Depot, with the East Coast Integrated Depot opening in the second half of 2026; services are operated by the T251 electric multiple unit (EMU) rolling stock manufactured by a joint venture between Kawasaki and CRRC.

New and improved signage was introduced to all stations along the TEL, which saw less text and wordiness, in favour of more illustrations and visuals. In addition, the exits are represented numerically rather than alphabetically. Other MRT and LRT lines are also represented by their initials. Outside the TEL, the new signage is being gradually rolled out to other existing and future MRT and LRT stations across the network.

== History ==
=== Thomson Line ===
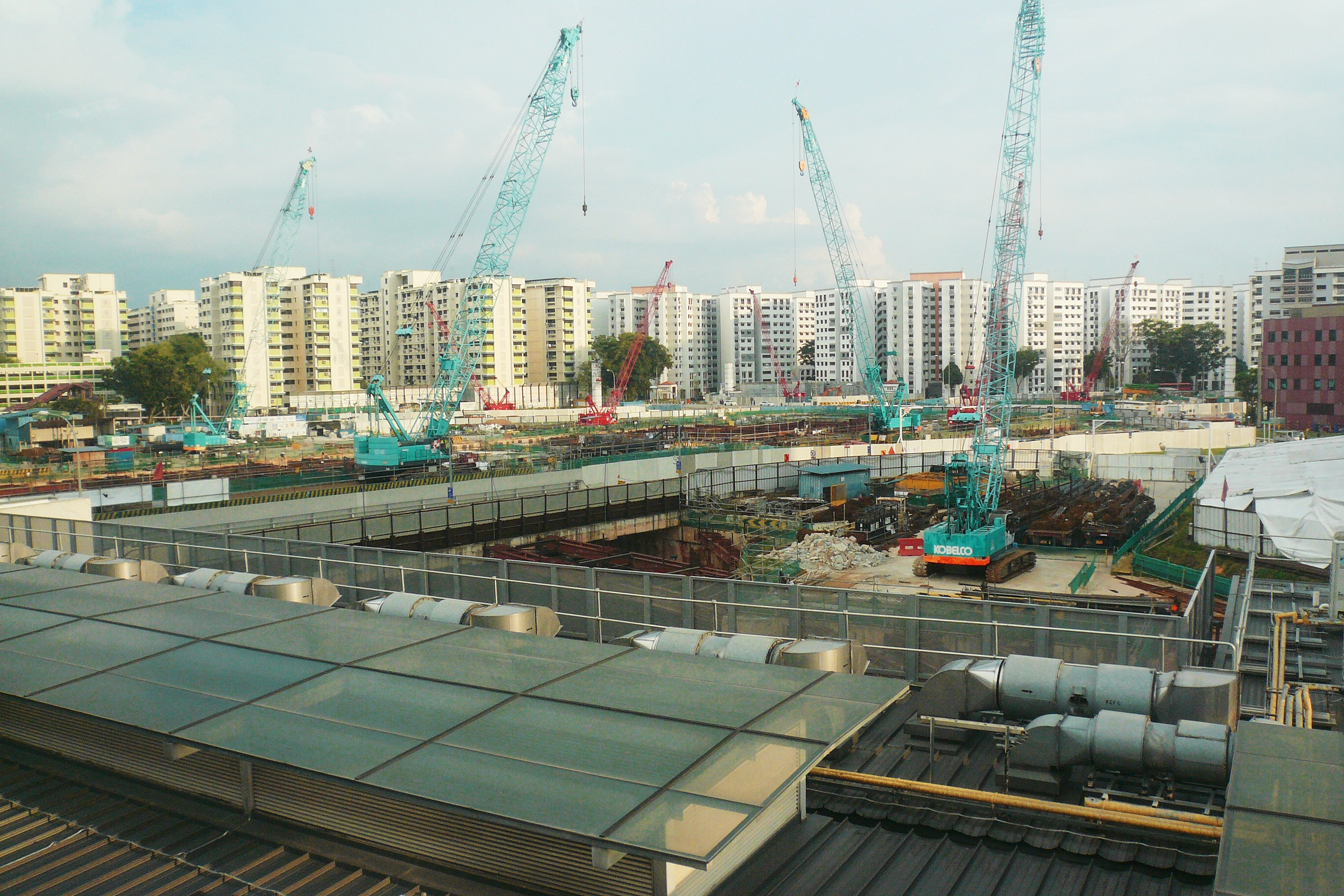
Construction of TEL's Woodlands station in 2017

The Thomson Line (TSL) was first announced on 25 January 2008. Several architectural and engineering consultancy packages were released in 2010 which indicated an increase in the number of stations from 18 in the initial announcement to the current 22 and length of the line from 27 to 30 km (17 to 19 mi).

On 16 June 2011, LTA announced the location of the depot for the line, which was due to begin construction at the end of 2012. It also announced Woodlands as an interchange with the existing North–South Line and an additional station located near to Republic Polytechnic.

On 29 August 2012, it was announced that the completion of the TSL was pushed back to 2019 onwards instead of the indicative timeline of 2018 announced in the Land Transport Masterplan.

Construction of the TSL began in January 2014. The groundbreaking ceremony took place on 27 June that year at Woodlands. All the working station names were confirmed as the final names except for Sin Ming station which was changed to Bright Hill.

=== Eastern Region Line ===
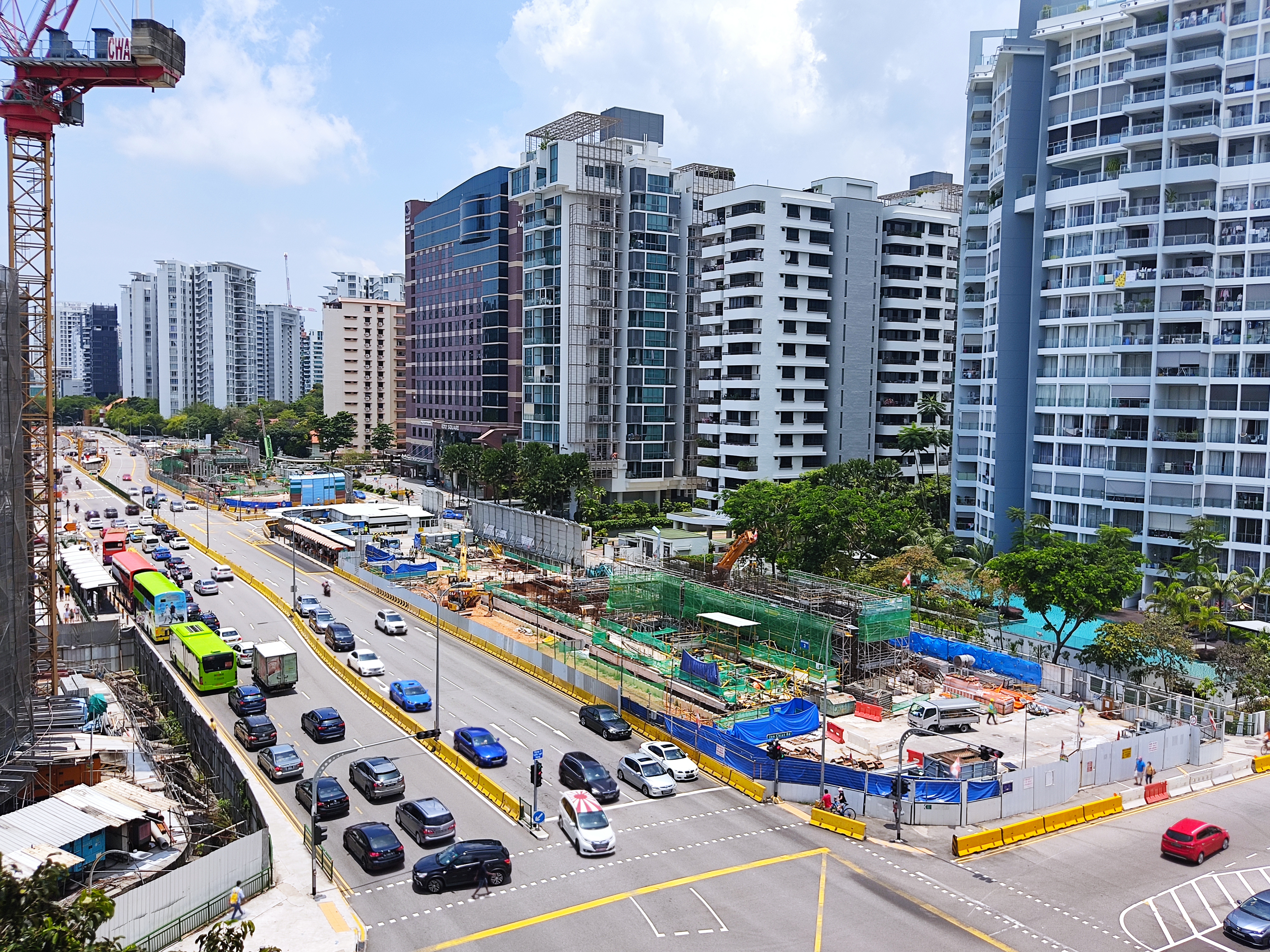
Construction site of Marine Parade station in 2022

The Eastern Region Line was first announced on 23 October 2001. In its preliminary plans, ERL was to have been a 40 kilometre rectangular loop that would complement the existing East–West Line and enhance inter- and intra-town travelling in the eastern region. It would have looped around the Jalan Besar and East Coast areas, intersecting the Circle Line and other lines along the way, benefiting residents in Tampines, Bedok, Marine Parade, MacPherson and Kaki Bukit. The northern part of the Eastern Region Line became the third stage of the Downtown Line. The southern part of the Eastern Region Line became the East Coast stretch of the Thomson–East Coast Line. Sungei Bedok would become an interchange between the Downtown and the Thomson–East Coast lines.

On 11 July 2012, Josephine Teo, Minister of State, Ministry of Finance and Ministry of Transport, announced that the Land Transport Authority is starting architectural and engineering consultancy studies for the Eastern Region Line, which will eventually connect to the Thomson Line.

The director of rail services from LTA, Melvyn Thong, said on 29 May 2013 at the Modern Railways conference that there are plans to extend the Eastern Region Line to the future Changi Airport Terminal 4 which was at that time, set to be ready by 2017 but on 1 June that year, the Land Transport Authority clarified that the Eastern Region Line will not provide an MRT link to the planned Terminal 4. On 30 August that year, Minister of State for Transport Josephine Teo unveiled plans that it will be linked to the future Changi Airport Terminal 5, a mega terminal, which will be the largest terminal in Singapore upon completion in the 2030s.

=== Merging of Eastern Region and Thomson Lines ===
The Eastern Region Line was merged with the Thomson Line on 15 August 2014 to form the Thomson–East Coast Line, extending the project from three to five stages, with nine more stations.

The groundbreaking ceremony for the East Coast stretch took place at Marine Parade on 21 July 2016. All the working station names, including Xilin on the Downtown Line Stage 3 extension, were confirmed as the final names except for Amber station which was changed to Tanjong Katong. The authorities were also considering extending the Thomson–East Coast Line to all terminals at Changi Airport, including the upcoming Terminal 5, announced Transport Minister Khaw Boon Wan.

=== Line operations ===
SMRT Trains Ltd was appointed as the operator of the line on 15 September 2017.

On 28 August 2019, the Land Transport Authority awarded several non-fare businesses along the line, with Asiaray Connect awarded an advertising contract and a consortium, made up of SMRT Experience, JR Business Development SEA and Alphaplus Investments appointed to run retail space. This is the first time the LTA outsourced these non-fare businesses.

On 19 September 2019, Transport Minister Khaw Boon Wan revealed that the opening of the first stage of the Thomson–East Coast Line from Woodlands North to Woodlands South stations was delayed to January 2020 from the indicative time of 2019 announced earlier, subsequently confirmed as 31 January 2020. Self-assistance kiosks were installed at all TEL MRT stations and will be rolled out to all stations. On 11 January 2020, SMRT and LTA hosted an open house for the first stage of the line, with the stage opening for revenue service on 31 January 2020.

The opening of the second stage was initially delayed to the first quarter of 2021 due to the effects of the COVID-19 pandemic circuit breaker period; the project was subsequently further delayed to the third quarter of 2021. On 30 April 2021, the LTA handed over Stage 2 stations along the line to SMRT to get the section ready for operations. On 30 June 2021, Transport Minister S. Iswaran announced that Stage 2 will open on 28 August 2021. The LTA announced on 13 August 2021 that there would be a virtual open house held from 23 to 27 August 2021 since all physical open houses were disallowed due to the COVID-19 pandemic. On 28 August 2021, Stage 2 opened, extending the line from Woodlands South to Caldecott.

On 23 November 2021, the LTA announced that Mount Pleasant and Marina South stations will only open when housing developments in these areas are ready, instead of opening as part of Stage 3. On 9 March 2022, Transport Minister S Iswaran announced in Parliament that TEL 3 would open in the 2nd half of 2022.

On 17 August 2022, the LTA handed over Stage 3 stations along the line to SMRT to get the section ready for operations by the end of 2022. On 7 October 2022, during a visit to the Outram Park and Maxwell TEL stations, Transport Minister S. Iswaran announced that Stage 3 will commence operations on 13 November 2022.

On 13 December 2023, the LTA announced that it would hand over Stage 4 stations along the line to SMRT in early 2024, in preparation for the opening of the stations. Acting Minister for Transport Chee Hong Tat said in an interview with Lianhe Zaobao that the authorities hope to open the sector in the first half of that year. The Stage 4 stations were handed over to SMRT on 6 February 2024. On 5 March 2024, LTA announced that Stage 4 would open on 23 June that year. A preview of Stage 4 was held on 21 June, with free rides for all 7 stations, with a free shuttle train running from Gardens by the Bay to Tanjong Rhu to ferry riders to the Stage 4 stations. On 23 June 2024, the Stage 4 opened, extending from Gardens by the Bay to Bayshore.

On 6 December 2024, it was announced that Stage 5 will commence operation in the second half of 2026.

On 6 October 2026, the LTA called for tenders to install rail dampers along stretches of the TEL where tighter track curves have caused higher rail noise levels, in addition to other trials, such as slowing down trains and grinding track surfaces, to reduce noise levels on the line and address commuter feedback.

=== Airport extension ===
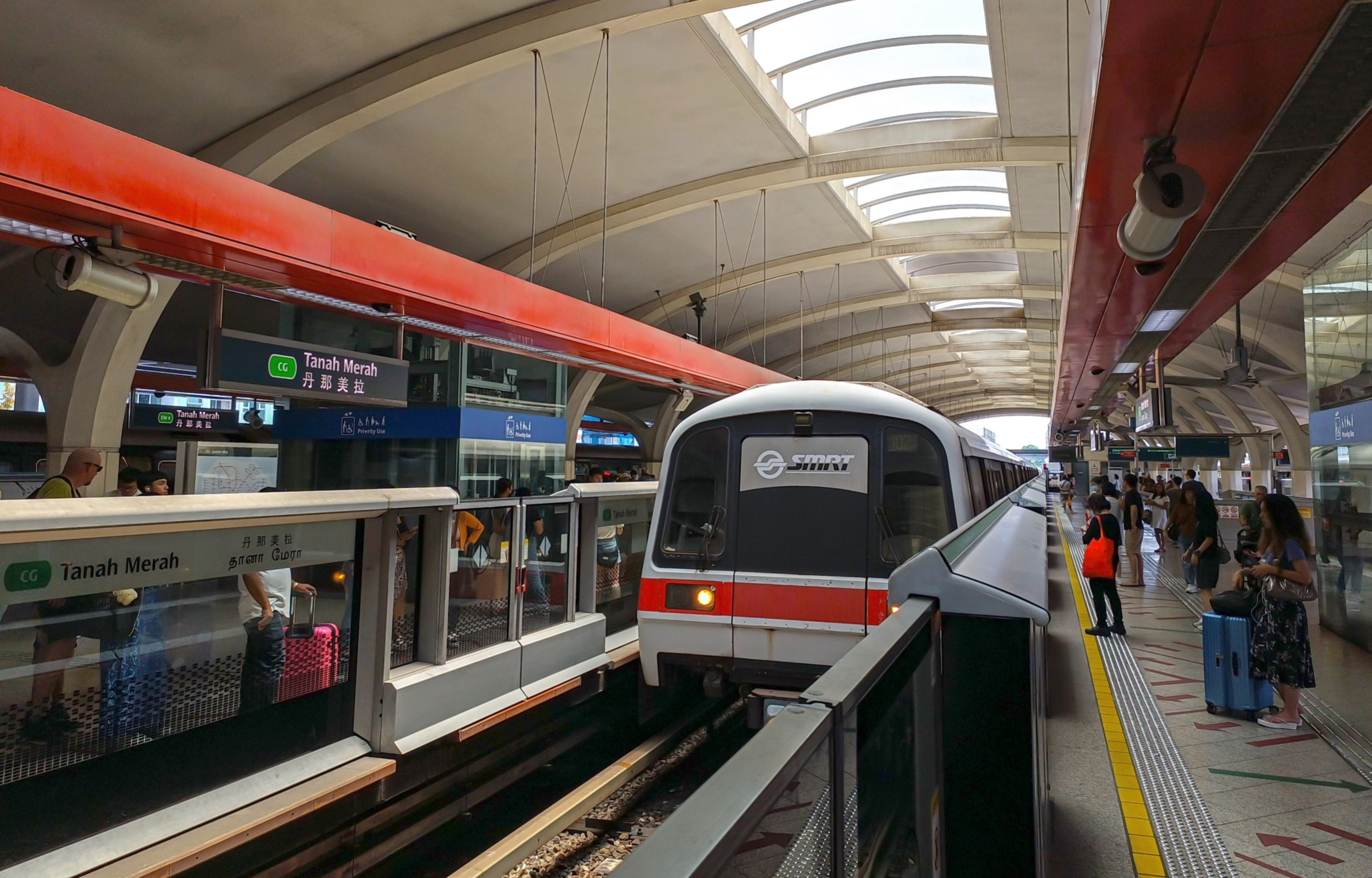
Tanah Merah station will become the terminus of the Thomson–East Coast Line upon the merger of the East–West Line branch serving Changi Airport.

On 25 May 2019, the LTA confirmed that it will extend the TEL from Sungei Bedok to Changi Airport Terminal 5. Construction works to extend the TEL to the existing Changi Airport MRT station, the eastern terminus of the East–West Line Changi Airport branch, commenced in 2020. The stretch of East–West Line between Tanah Merah and Changi Airport, known as the Changi Airport Line (CGL), will be converted to form part of the TEL extension. The extension was expected to begin construction after 2022.

In May 2024, the LTA confirmed modification works for the CGL stations will start from 2025 after the contract for addition and alteration works is awarded. In July 2025, a contract worth S$94.3 mil was awarded to Chiu Teng Construction for the modification of the CGL stations to be integrated with the TEL. That same month, the alignment of the TEL extension was unveiled. Alstom was awarded the contract for the conversion of the CGL signalling system to match the TEL's Urbalis 400 CBTC system the following month.

== Route ==
Geographically accurate map of the Thomson–East Coast Line.

The 43-kilometre (26.7 mi) Thomson–East Coast Line runs in a north-south direction between Woodlands North and Gardens by the Bay stations and west-east direction between Gardens by the Bay and Sungei Bedok stations. Beginning at Woodlands North, the line runs south passing the neighbourhood of Woodlands. Between Woodlands South and Springleaf, a branch has been implied for trains going to Mandai depot. It continues heading south-east, bypassing Ang Mo Kio, towards Lentor before curving south towards Mayflower station.

After Bright Hill station, the line curves south towards Caldecott station before curving west passing the unopened Mount Pleasant towards Stevens station, which it has an interchange with the Downtown Line. From Napier station, the line heads east towards Orchard station, also interchanging with the North–South Line. It continues heading south between Orchard and Havelock stations, cutting underneath the Singapore River before heading south-east towards Outram Park station, which has an interchange with the East–West Line and North East Line.

It then enters the Downtown Core, by heading in a south-east direction towards Marina Bay station, which has an interchange with the North–South Line and Circle Line. The line then heads north-east towards Gardens by the Bay, passing underneath the Kallang Basin, before heading north passing Founders’ Memorial station, which is scheduled to be opened in 2028. It then curves eastwards between Tanjong Rhu and Bayshore stations, paralleling Marine Parade Road. By 2H 2026, the line will continue east towards Sungei Bedok, the future terminus with which it will have an interchange with the Downtown Line.

== Stations ==
Station codes for the line are brown, corresponding to the line's colour on the system map. Most stations are island stations, with the exception of Napier, Maxwell, Shenton Way, Marina Bay, Katong Park and Tanjong Katong, which have stacked side platforms whilst Tanjong Rhu station has side platforms.

A station box provisionally named "Tagore" is located between the Springleaf and Lentor stations.

Thomson–East Coast Line stations timeline
| Date Opened | Project | Description |
|---|---|---|
| 31 January 2020 | Stage 1 (TEL1) | Woodlands North – Woodlands South |
| 28 August 2021 | Stage 2 (TEL2) | Springleaf – Caldecott |
| 13 November 2022 | Stage 3 (TEL3) | Stevens – Gardens By The Bay |
| 23 June 2024 | Stage 4 (TEL4) | Tanjong Rhu – Bayshore |
| 26 December 2026 | Stage 5 (TEL5) | Bedok South – Sungei Bedok |
| In tandem with Founders' Memorial (2028) | Founders' Memorial station | Founders' Memorial station between Gardens by the Bay and Tanjong Rhu |
| In tandem with Mount Pleasant Housing Estate | Mount Pleasant station | Mount Pleasant station between Caldecott and Stevens |
| In tandem with Marina South developments | Marina South station | Marina South station between Marina Bay and Gardens by the Bay |
| Mid-2030s | Thomson–East Coast Line Extension (TELe) | Sungei Bedok – Changi Airport |
| Mid-2030s | Thomson–East Coast Line Extension (TELe) | Changi Airport – Tanah Merah (Conversion from East–West Line to Thomson–East Coast Line) |

Legend

| Elevated | Line terminus | Transfer outside paid area |
| Ground-level | Wheelchair accessible | Bus interchange |
| Underground | Civil Defence Shelter | Other transportation modes |

List

| Station code | Station name | Images | Interchange; Adjacent transportation | Opening | Cost |
|---|---|---|---|---|---|
| TE1 – RTS | Woodlands North | | RTS Link (2027) | 31 January 2020; 6 years ago | S$337 million (Note: Contract T202) |
| TE2 NS9 | Woodlands | | North–South Line ― Woodlands; Woodlands Temporary | 31 January 2020; 6 years ago | S$292 million (Note: Contract T203) |
| TE3 | Woodlands South | | — | 31 January 2020; 6 years ago | S$143.7 million (Note: Contract T205) |
| TE3 | Woodlands South | | — | 31 January 2020; 6 years ago | S$421.6 million (Note: Contract T206) |
| TE4 | Springleaf | | — | 28 August 2021; 5 years ago | S$189.8 million (Note: Contract T207) |
| TE4 | Springleaf | | — | 28 August 2021; 5 years ago | S$383.3 million (Note: Contract T208) |
| TE5 | Lentor | | — | 28 August 2021; 5 years ago | S$247.2 million (Note: Contract T209) |
| TE6 | Mayflower | | — | 28 August 2021; 5 years ago | S$174.3 million (Note: Contract T210) |
| TE7 CR13 | Bright Hill | | Cross Island Line (2030) | 28 August 2021; 5 years ago | S$454.4 million (Note: Contract T211) |
| TE8 | Upper Thomson | | — | 28 August 2021; 5 years ago | S$374.0 million (Note: Contract T212) |
| TE9 CC17 | Caldecott | | Circle Line | 28 August 2021; 5 years ago | S$284.8 million (Note: Contract T213) |
| TE10 | Mount Pleasant (Note: To be opened in tandem with future developments) | | — | TBA | S$207.3 million (Note: Contract T215) |
| TE11 DT10 | Stevens | | Downtown Line | 13 November 2022; 4 years ago | S$441.0 million (Note: Contract T216) |
| TE12 | Napier | | — | 13 November 2022; 4 years ago | S$188.8 million (Note: Contract T217) |
| TE13 | Orchard Boulevard | | — | 13 November 2022; 4 years ago | S$142.5 million (Note: Contract T218) |
| TE14 NS22 | Orchard | | North–South Line | 13 November 2022; 4 years ago | S$498.3 million (Note: Contract T219) |
| TE15 | Great World | | — | 13 November 2022; 4 years ago | S$315.8 million (Note: Contract T220) |
| TE16 | Havelock | | — | 13 November 2022; 4 years ago | S$210.3 million (Note: Contract T221) |
| TE17 EW16 NE3 | Outram Park | | East–West Line; North East Line | 13 November 2022; 4 years ago | S$300.8 million (Note: Contract T222) |
| TE18 | Maxwell | | — | 13 November 2022; 4 years ago | S$221.8 million (Note: Contract T223) |
| TE19 | Shenton Way | | — | 13 November 2022; 4 years ago | S$368 million (Note: Contract T225) |
| TE20 NS27 CC33 | Marina Bay | | North–South Line; Circle Line | 13 November 2022; 4 years ago | S$425 million (Note: Contract T226) |
| TE21 | Marina South (Note: To be opened in tandem with future developments) | | — | TBA | S$488.0 million (Note: Contract T227) |
| TE22 | Gardens by the Bay | | — | 13 November 2022; 4 years ago | S$331.0 million (Note: Contract T228) |
| TE22A | Founders' Memorial (Note: To be opened in tandem with Founders' Memorial) | | — | 2028; 2 years' time | S$242.4 million (Note: Contract T302) |
| TE23 | Tanjong Rhu | | — | 23 June 2024; 2 years ago | S$293.9 million (Note: Contract T303) |
| TE24 | Katong Park | | — | 23 June 2024; 2 years ago | S$293.5 million (Note: Contract T305) |
| TE25 | Tanjong Katong | | — | 23 June 2024; 2 years ago | S$145.6 million (Note: Contract T306) |
| TE26 | Marine Parade | | — | 23 June 2024; 2 years ago | S$555.3 million (Note: Contract T307) |
| TE27 | Marine Terrace | | — | 23 June 2024; 2 years ago | S$360.6 million (Note: Contract T308) |
| TE28 | Siglap | | — | 23 June 2024; 2 years ago | S$175.76 million (Note: Contract T309) |
| TE29 | Bayshore | | — | 23 June 2024; 2 years ago | S$295.9 million (Note: Contract T310) |
Stage 5 (under testing, to be ready by 26 December 2026)
| TE30 | Bedok South | | Bedok South (U/C) | 26 December 2026; 0 years ago | S$188.3 million (Note: Contract T311) |
| TE31 DT37 | Sungei Bedok | | Downtown Line (2026) | 26 December 2026; 0 years ago | S$417.5 million (Note: Contract T312) |
Thomson–East Coast Line Extension (under planning, to be ready by Mid-2030s)
| TE32 CR1 | Changi Terminal 5 | | Cross Island Line; Changi Airport Terminal 5 | Mid-2030s; 9 years' time | S$315.2 million (Note: Contract T316) |
| TE33 | Changi Airport | | Changi Airport Terminals 1–4 ― Changi Airport | Mid-2030s; 9 years' time | TBA |
| TE34 DT35 | Expo | | Downtown Line | Mid-2030s; 9 years' time | TBA |
| TE35 EW4 | Tanah Merah | | East–West Line | Mid-2030s; 9 years' time | TBA |

=== Depots ===
| Depot name; Lines | Location | Image | Line-specific stabling capacity | Cost | Opening |
|---|---|---|---|---|---|
| Mandai | Mandai | | 90 trains | S$329 million | 31 January 2020; 6 years ago |
| East Coast; EWL; DTL | Changi | | 62 trains | S$1.99 billion | 2H 2026; 0 years ago |

== Train control ==
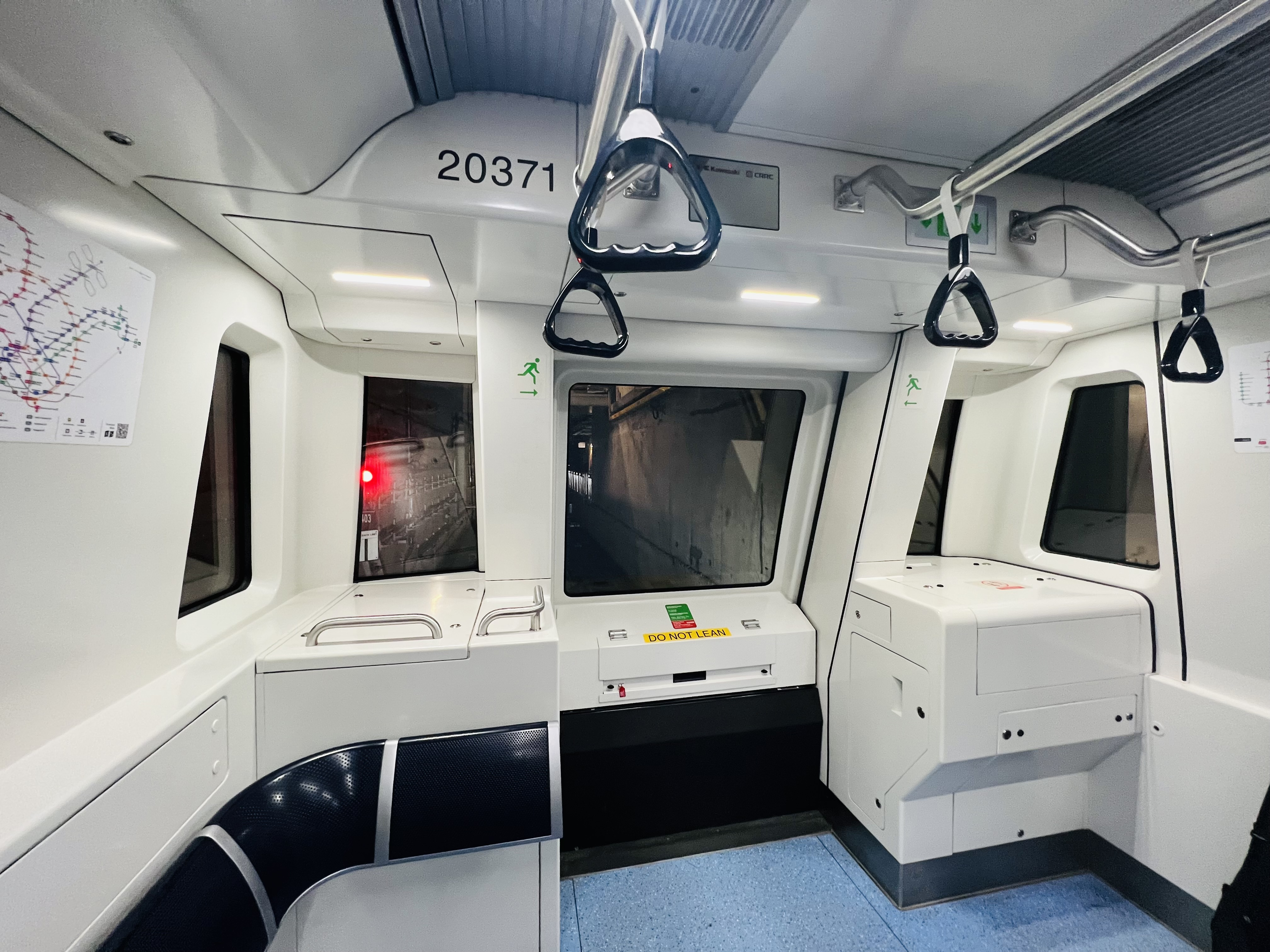
The Thomson East-Coast line runs under ATO GoA 4 and does not require an attendant on board.

The Thomson–East Coast Line is equipped with Alstom Urbalis 400 Communications-based train control (CBTC) moving block signalling system with Automatic train control (ATC) under Automatic train operation (ATO) GoA 4 (UTO). The subsystems consist of Automatic train protection (ATP) to govern train speed, Iconis Automatic Train Supervision (ATS) to track and schedule trains and Smartlock Computer-based interlocking (CBI) system that prevents incorrect signal and track points to be set.

Alstom supplies the platform screen doors for the Thomson–East Coast Line.

== Fares ==
All Thomson–East Coast Line stations began to have top-up kiosks that only accepts cashless payments whereas there is only one general ticketing machine (GTM) in each station. With the removal of single-trip tickets, all remaining GTM machines were replaced by TUK-A. Commuters can still top up at the minimum of $2 for School Smartcard, ITE Student card and Diploma Student card, $5 for persons with disabilities and $10 for adults and Passion Silver using cash. E-payment top-ups remains unchanged at the minimum $5 for students and $10 for adults.

Public transport journeys were paid using MasterCard, NETS, VISA, American Express, CEPAS 3.0 EZ-Link, CEPAS 3.0 Concession, NETS Prepaid and the early CEPAS versions (utilising Card-Based Ticketing (CBT)) of EZ-Link, Concession and NETS stored-value cards (commonly known as NETS FlashPay). As a result, SimplyGo is there for any travel, card and fare enquiries.

== Rolling stock ==
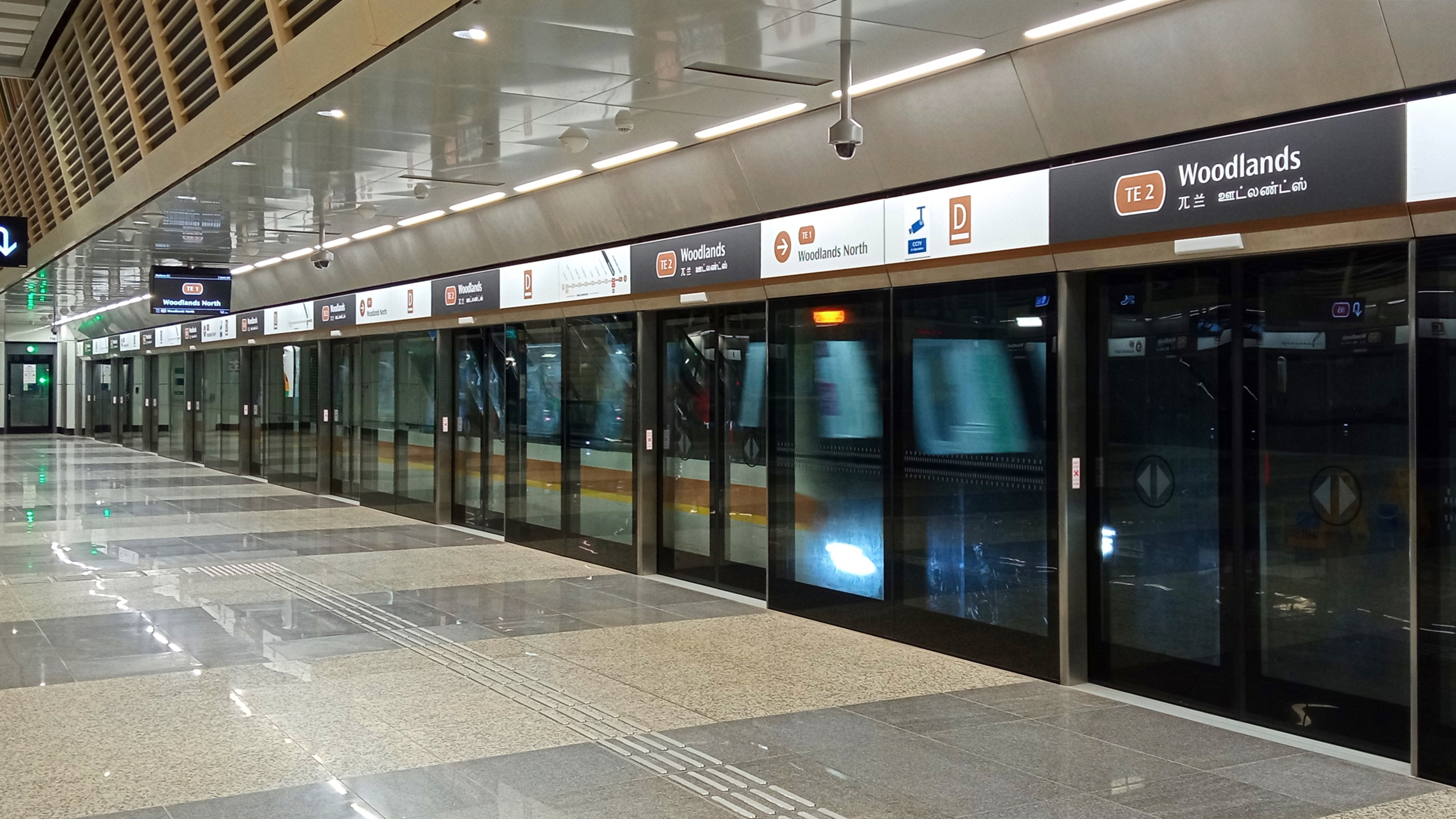
Kawasaki–CRRC Qingdao Sifang T251 at Woodlands station

The first generation of rolling stock being introduced onto the Thomson–East Coast Line is the T251, built by Japan's Kawasaki Heavy Industries and China's CRRC Qingdao Sifang in Qingdao, China. The trains are built with 5 doors per side per car, which is the very first in Singapore to have this configuration. They are also completely automated and driverless. The trains are housed at the Mandai Depot and the future East Coast Integrated Depot (shared with the Downtown Line and East–West Line).

== See also ==
- Transport in Singapore
