= Founders' Memorial MRT station =

Future Mass Rapid Transit station in Singapore

Founders' Memorial TE22A 建国先贤纪念园 தேச நிறுவனர்கள் நினைவிடம் Peringatan Pengasas
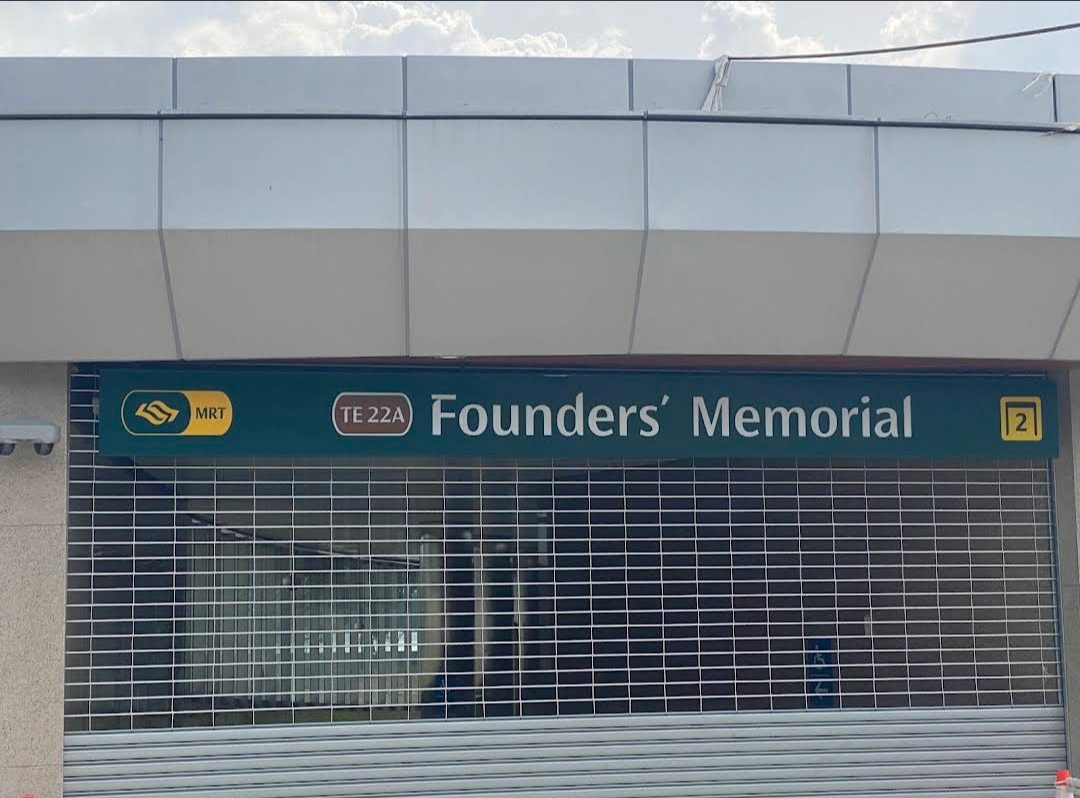
- Founders' Memorial Exit 2

General information
- Location: 41 Rhu Cross, Singapore 438965
- Coordinates: 01°17′27″N 103°52′09″E
- System: Future Mass Rapid Transit (MRT) station
- Owner: Land Transport Authority
- Operator: SMRT Trains
- Line: Thomson–East Coast Line
- Platforms: 2 (1 island platform)
- Tracks: 2

Construction
- Structure type: Underground
- Platform levels: 1
- Accessible: Yes

Other information
- Station code: FDM

History
- Opening: Opening in tandem with Founders’ Memorial in 2028; 2 years' time
- Former names: Gardens Bay East, Marina East

Services
Preceding station	Mass Rapid Transit	Following station
Gardens by the Bay towards Woodlands North	Thomson–East Coast Line Future service	Tanjong Rhu towards Sungei Bedok
Track layout
Location
- Location within Singapore Rail central area

Founders' Memorial MRT station is a non-operational underground Mass Rapid Transit (MRT) station on the Thomson–East Coast Line in Marina East, Singapore. Construction began in 2019, and the station is scheduled to open in tandem with the Founders' Memorial in 2028. Although the station is completed, trains currently skip this station and continue their journey towards Tanjong Rhu or Gardens by the Bay. The station is located within the Bay East Garden of Gardens by the Bay, next to the Founders' Memorial.

== History ==
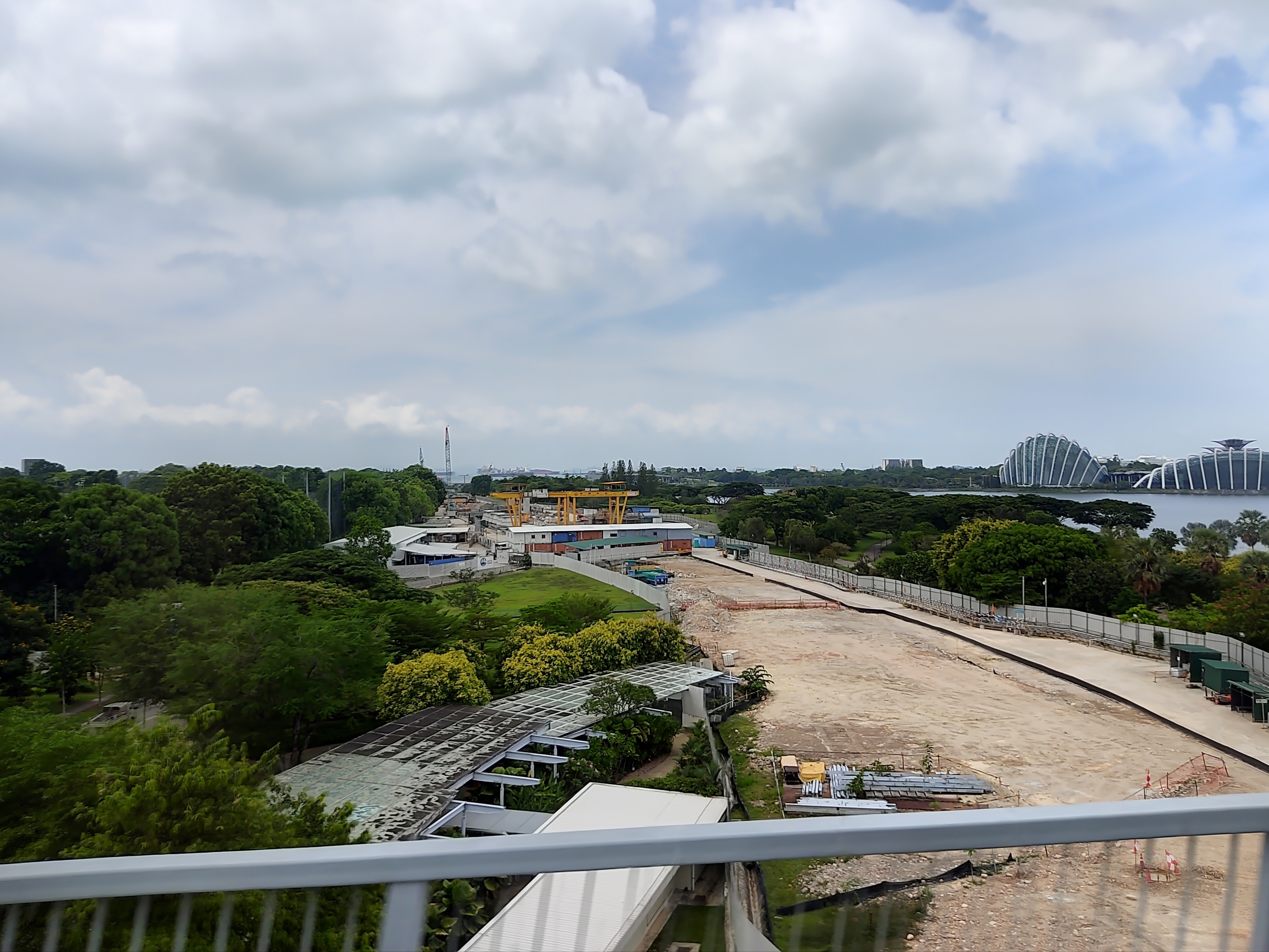
Construction works as of April 2021

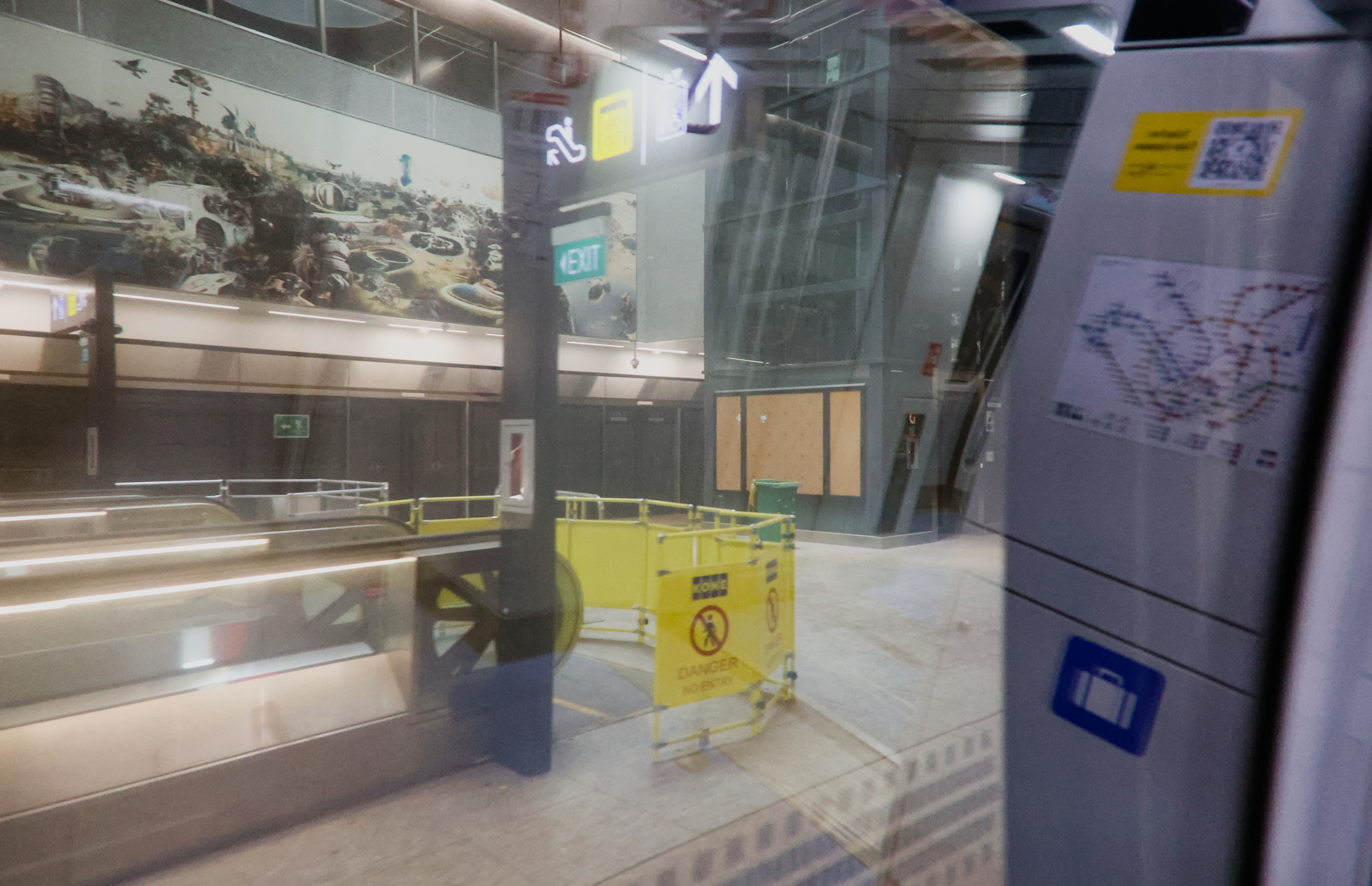
Passing by the closed station in April 2026

Founders' Memorial station was originally known as "Marina East" or "Gardens Bay East" in the conceptual plans since 2008. It was originally built as a reserved station. In January 2019, the station was announced as "Founders' Memorial" and will open in 2028, in tandem with the Founders' Memorial.

Contract T302 for the fitting-out works of the existing TEL station box at Bay East Garden into an operational station was awarded to China Railway First Group Co., Ltd at a sum of S$242.4 million in June 2016. Construction commenced in 2019, with opening slated for 2028.
