= Woodlands South MRT station =

Mass Rapid Transit station in Singapore

Woodlands South TE3 兀兰南 உட்லண்ட்ஸ் சவுத்
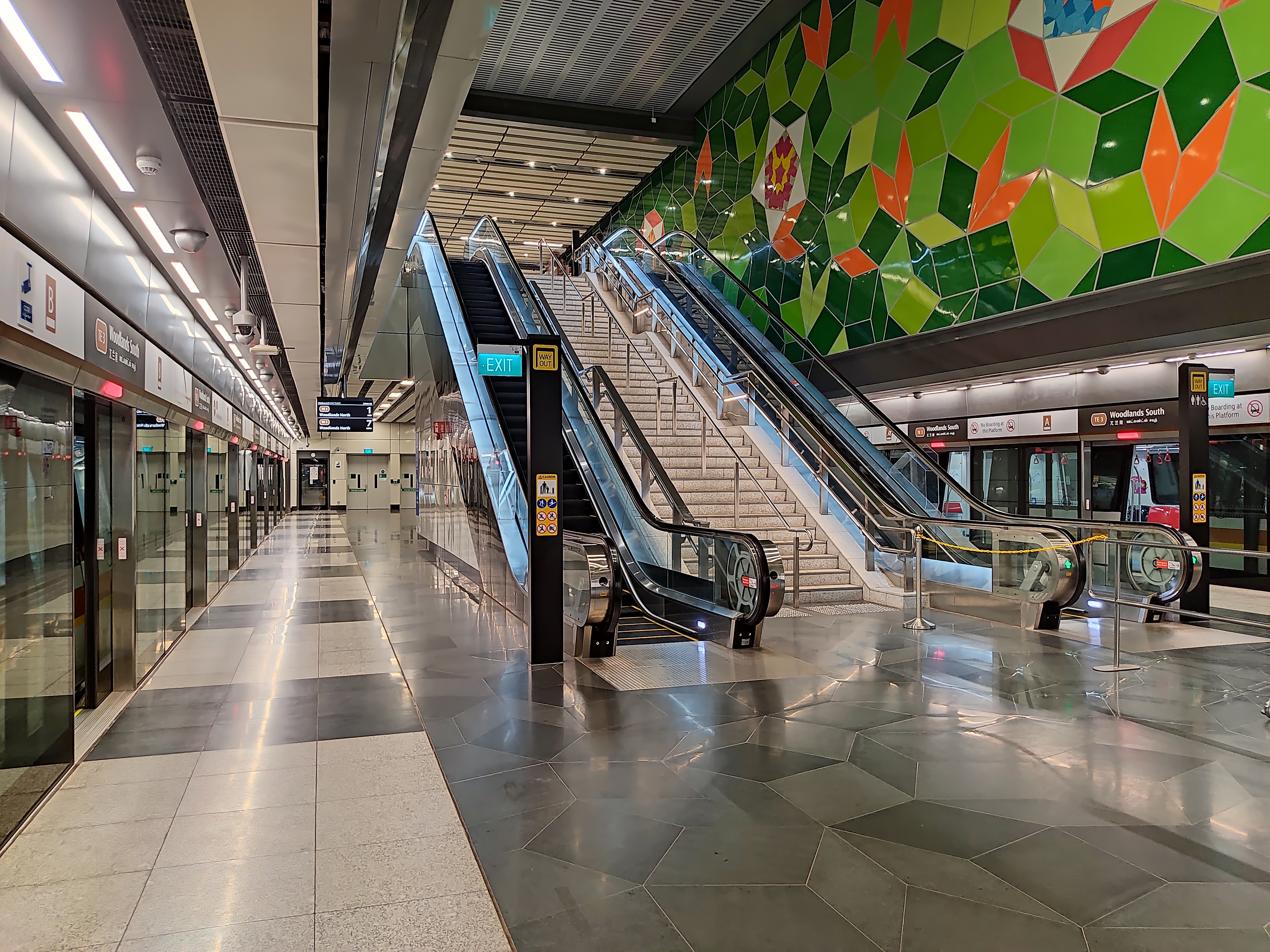
- Platform level of Woodlands South station

General information
- Location: 30 Woodlands Drive 17, Singapore 737741
- Coordinates: 01°25′38″N 103°47′38″E
- System: Mass Rapid Transit (MRT) station
- Owner: Land Transport Authority
- Operator: SMRT Trains Ltd (SMRT Corporation)
- Line: Thomson–East Coast Line
- Platforms: 2 (1 island platform)
- Tracks: 2
- Connections: Bus, Taxi

Construction
- Structure type: Underground
- Platform levels: 1
- Accessible: Yes

Other information
- Station code: WDS

History
- Opened: 31 January 2020; 6 years ago
- Former names: Champions Way, Woodgrove

Passengers
- June 2024: 9,559 per day

Services
Preceding station	Mass Rapid Transit	Following station
Woodlands towards Woodlands North	Thomson–East Coast Line	Springleaf towards Bayshore
Track layout
Location
- Location within Singapore Rail

Woodlands South MRT station is an underground Mass Rapid Transit (MRT) station in Woodlands, Singapore. Serving the Thomson–East Coast Line (TEL), it is underneath Woodlands Avenue 1. The station is nearby Christ Church Secondary School, Yusof Ishak Mosque, Singapore Sports School, and the Woodlands Hospital.

First announced in August 2012 as part of the Thomson Line (TSL), the station was constructed as part of TEL Phase 1 (TEL 1) after plans for the TSL and the Eastern Region Line (ERL) were merged. Along with the TEL 1 stations, Woodlands South station opened on 31 January 2020. The two-level underground station is designed by Aedas and has five entrances. The station features an Art-in-Transit artwork 3652 + 50 by Kng Mian Tze.

== History ==
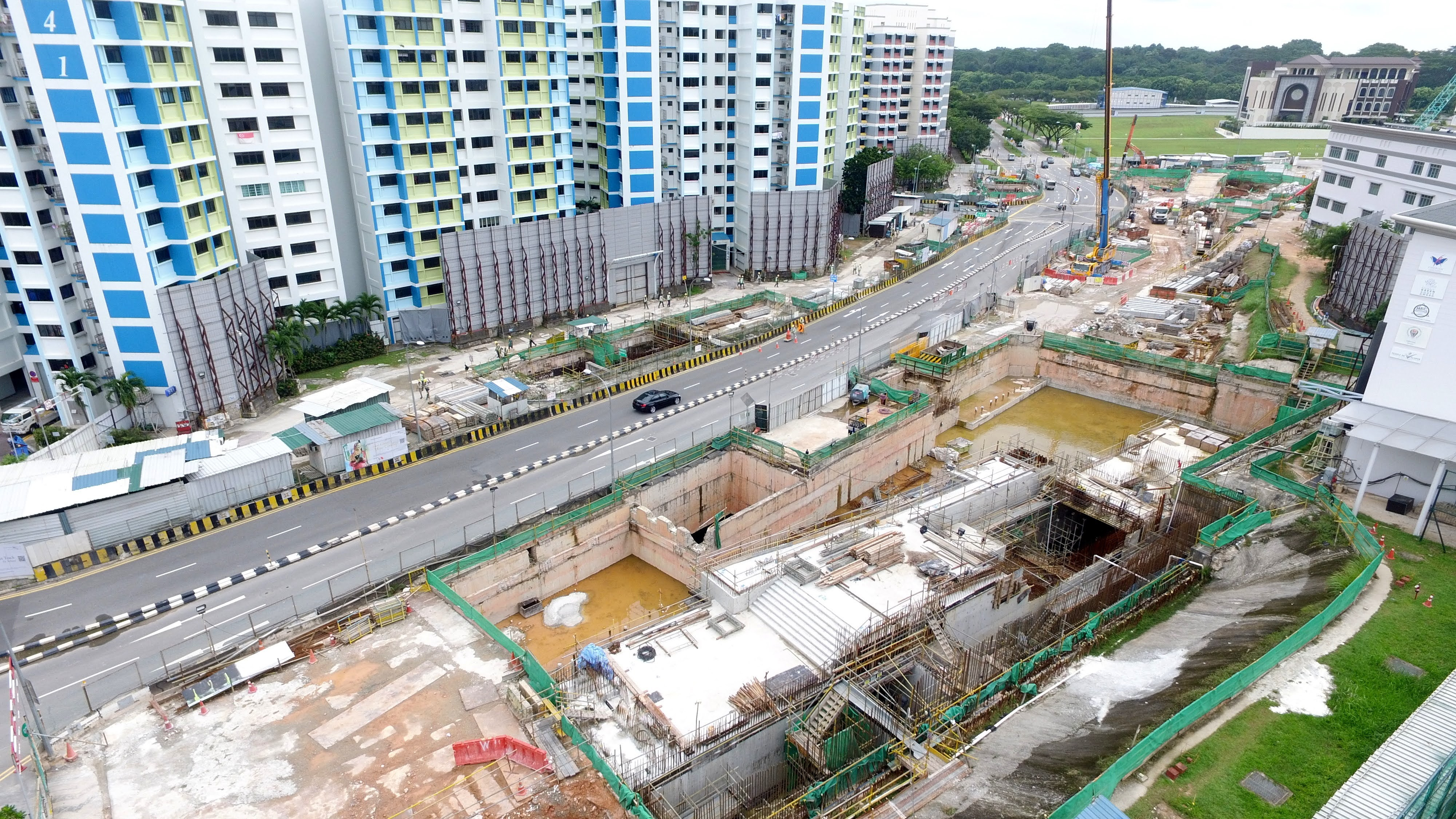
Construction site of the station in December 2017

The station was first announced as part of the 22-station Thomson Line (TSL) on 29 August 2012. In July 2013, Shanghai Tunnel Engineering Co. Ltd was awarded a S$421 million (US$336.5 million) contract for the construction of bored tunnels connecting from Woodlands station to Mandai Depot via this station. Tunnelling works were scheduled to begin in August that year. In August, the contract for the design and construction of the station was awarded to Woh Hup Private Limited at S$144 million (US$115.1 million). Construction was scheduled to be completed in 2019. The station's groundbreaking ceremony was held on 2 August 2014 at the Admiralty National Day Observation Ceremony.

On 15 August, the Land Transport Authority (LTA) further announced that TSL would merge with the Eastern Region line to form the Thomson–East Coast Line (TEL). Woodlands South station, part of the proposed line, would be constructed as part of Phase 1 (TEL 1), which consists of three stations from Woodlands North to this station. TEL 1 was expected to be completed in 2019. Construction of the station required the monitoring its impact to the surrounding flats, using geotechnical instruments such as ground-settlement markers and water standpipes.

The LTA announced in December that the TEL 1 stations would be opened on 31 January 2020. Before the stations commenced operations on that day, an open house for the TEL 1 stations was held on 11 January 2020. The station was the terminus of the TEL throughout the half of the COVID-19 pandemic until the opening of TEL 2 on 28 August 2021.

== Station details ==
Woodlands South station serves the Thomson–East Coast Line (TEL) and is between the Woodlands and Springleaf stations. The official station code is TE3. Being part of the TEL, the station is operated by SMRT Trains. Train frequencies on the TEL range from 3 to 6 minutes.

The station has five entrances that serve public amenities such as ACE The Place CC, Admiralty Sports Park and the Woodlands Hospital. Schools surrounding the station include Christ Church Secondary School, Innova Primary School, Singapore Sports School and Woodgrove Secondary School. The station is close to a few religious institutions such as Light of Christ Church and Masjid Yusof Ishak.

Woodlands South station is designed by Aedas. The two-level underground station has a depth of 22 metres (72 ft) and length of 206 metres (676 ft). The station design is intended to reflect the surrounding residential developments, with the entrances designed to receive a maximum amount of sunlight. The station has a spacious interior, with an open view of the platforms from the concourse level. The platforms are accessible via escalators and staircases.

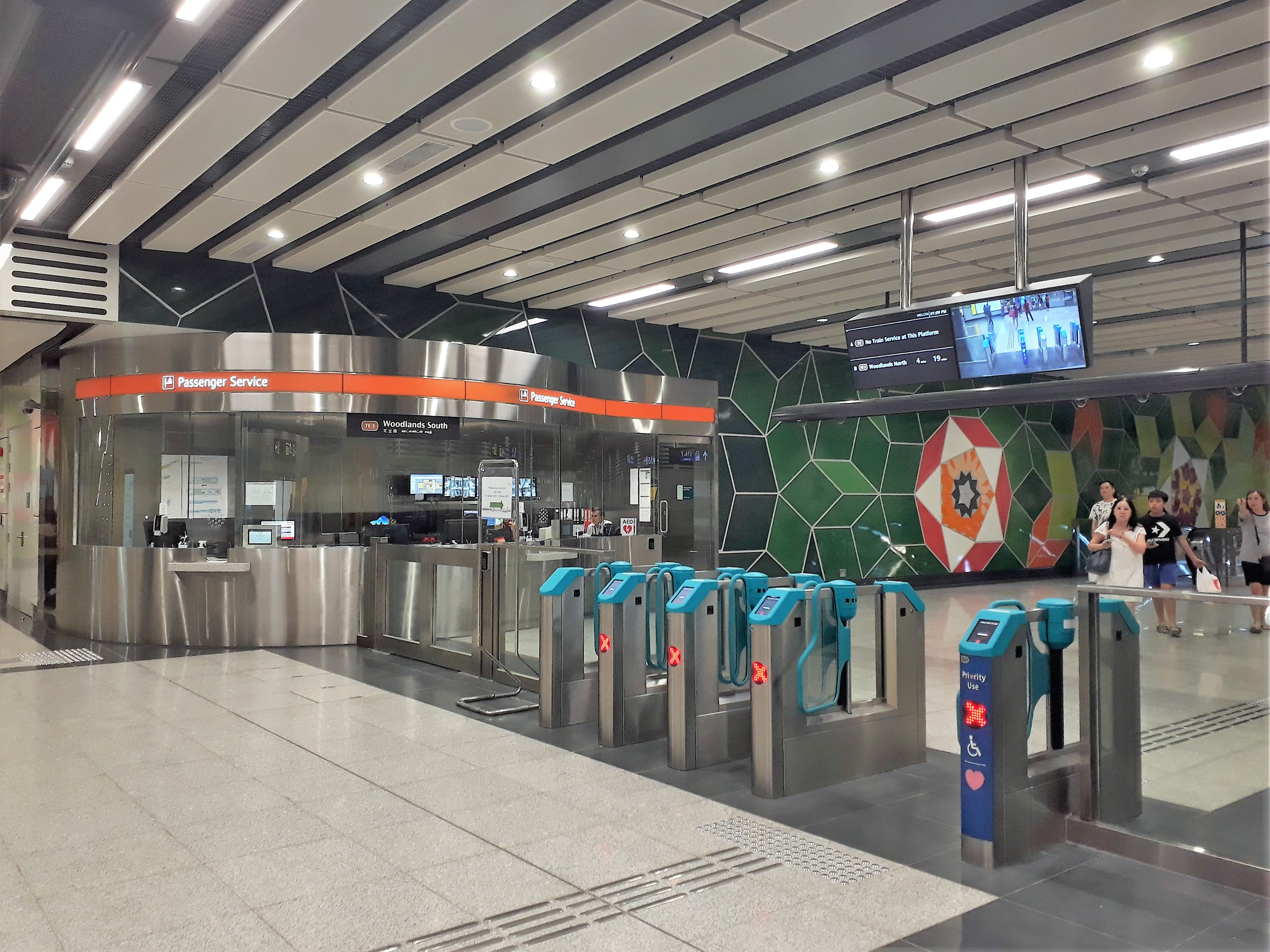
Faregates at the concourse level

Commissioned as part of the Art-in-Transit programme, Kng Mian Tze's 3652 + 50 is displayed at this station. Consisting of geometric shapes in Penrose tiling arrangement, the symbols and messages in the artwork were written by 50 individuals as part of the artist's engagement with the local community. These messages and symbols were promises set by the volunteers in 2013 to work on for the subsequent 10 years. It was expected that by the time the station opened, the participants have moved on to a different stage of life.

The green scheme used for the artwork along the concourse level makes reference to Singapore being a "garden city". Intended as a "time capsule of promises", Kng viewed our daily commute as not just merely travelling from one destination to another, but rather as part of our life's journey. She hoped that the public would be reminded through her work that these commutes were also their "little steps" towards achieving their personal goals. One challenging part of her artwork was having to combine the various illustrations and messages into a cohesive work. This artwork was Kng's largest public art involving the community.

Artwork in the station

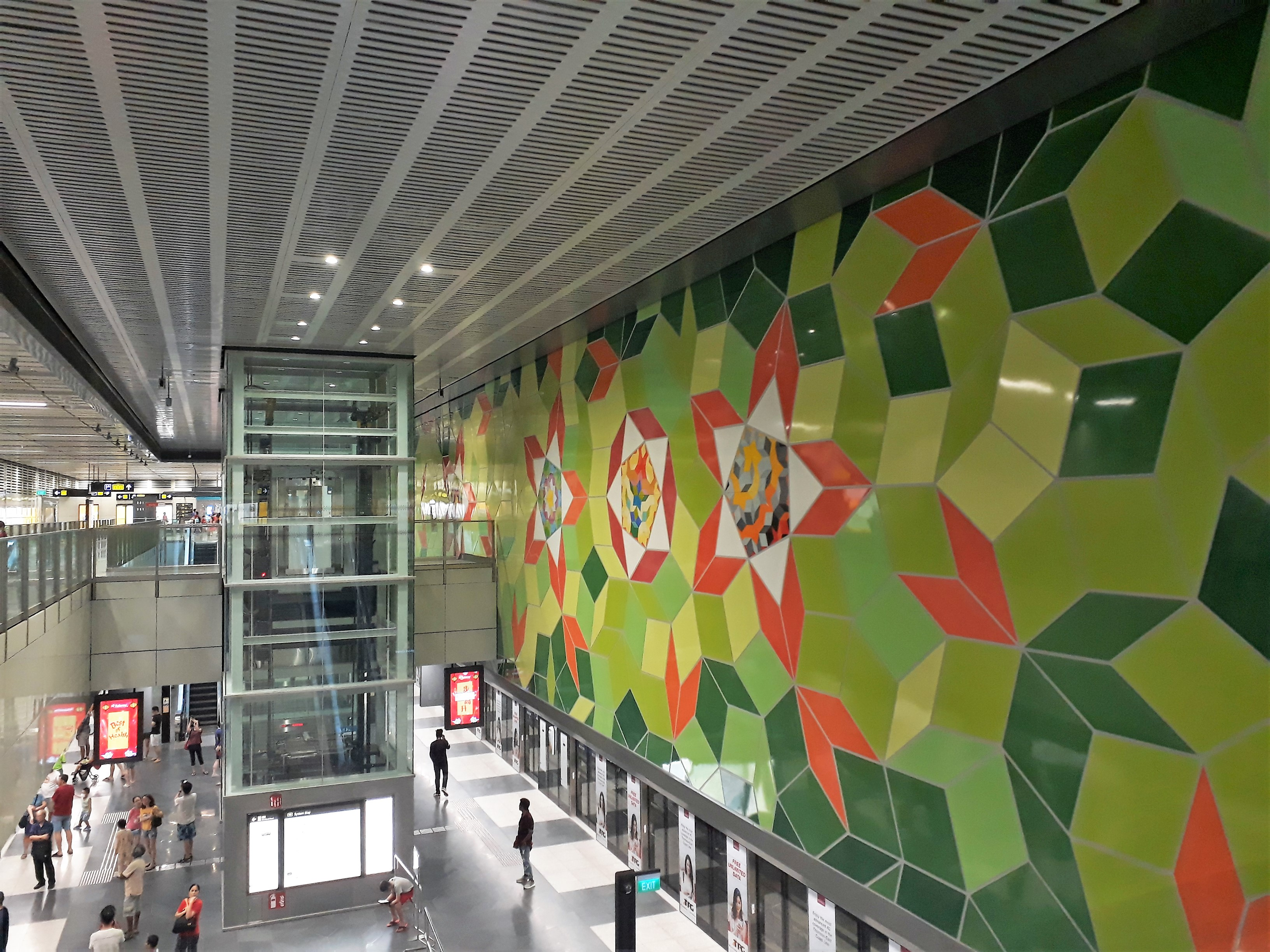
Above the platform

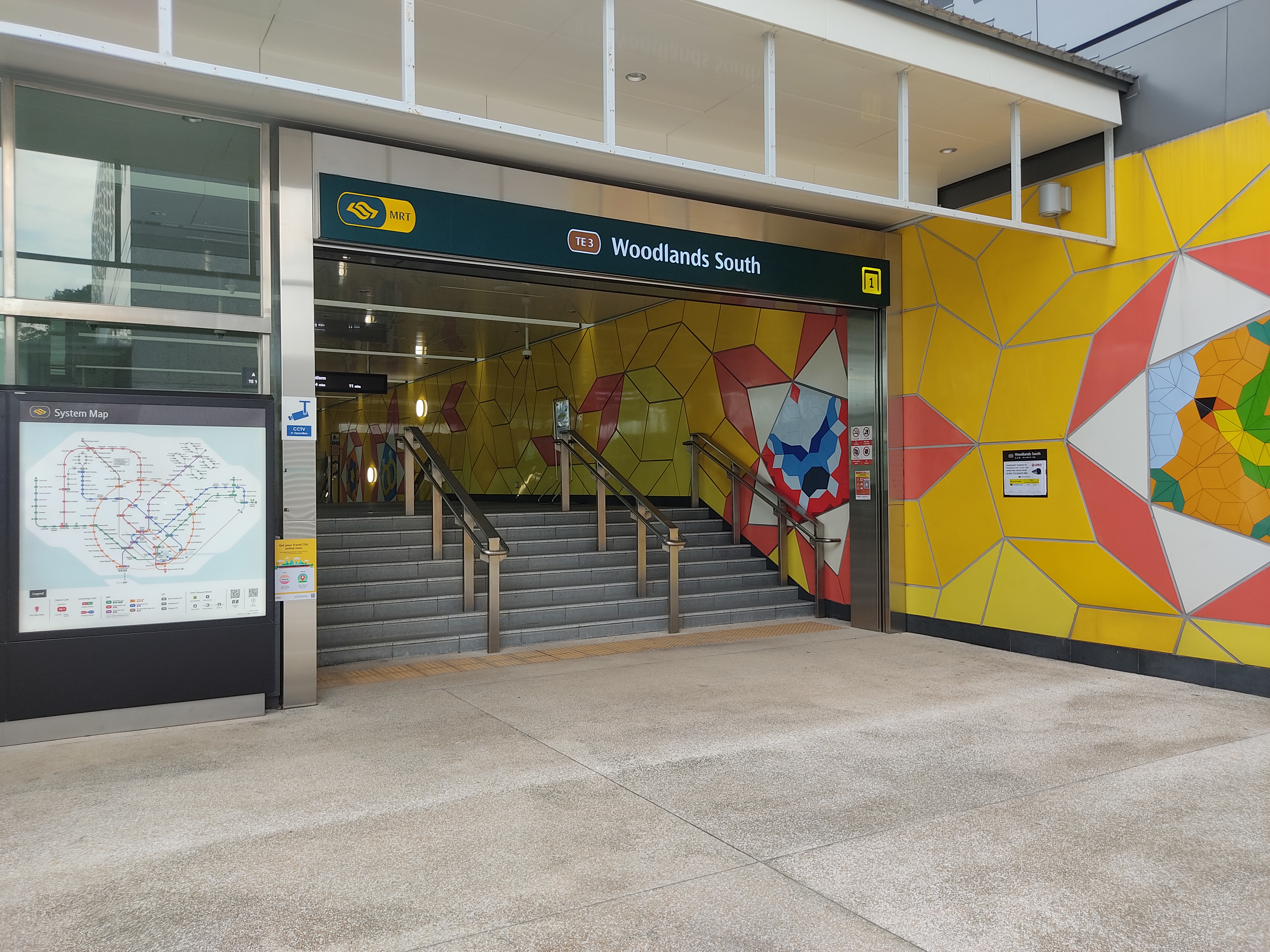
At Exit 1

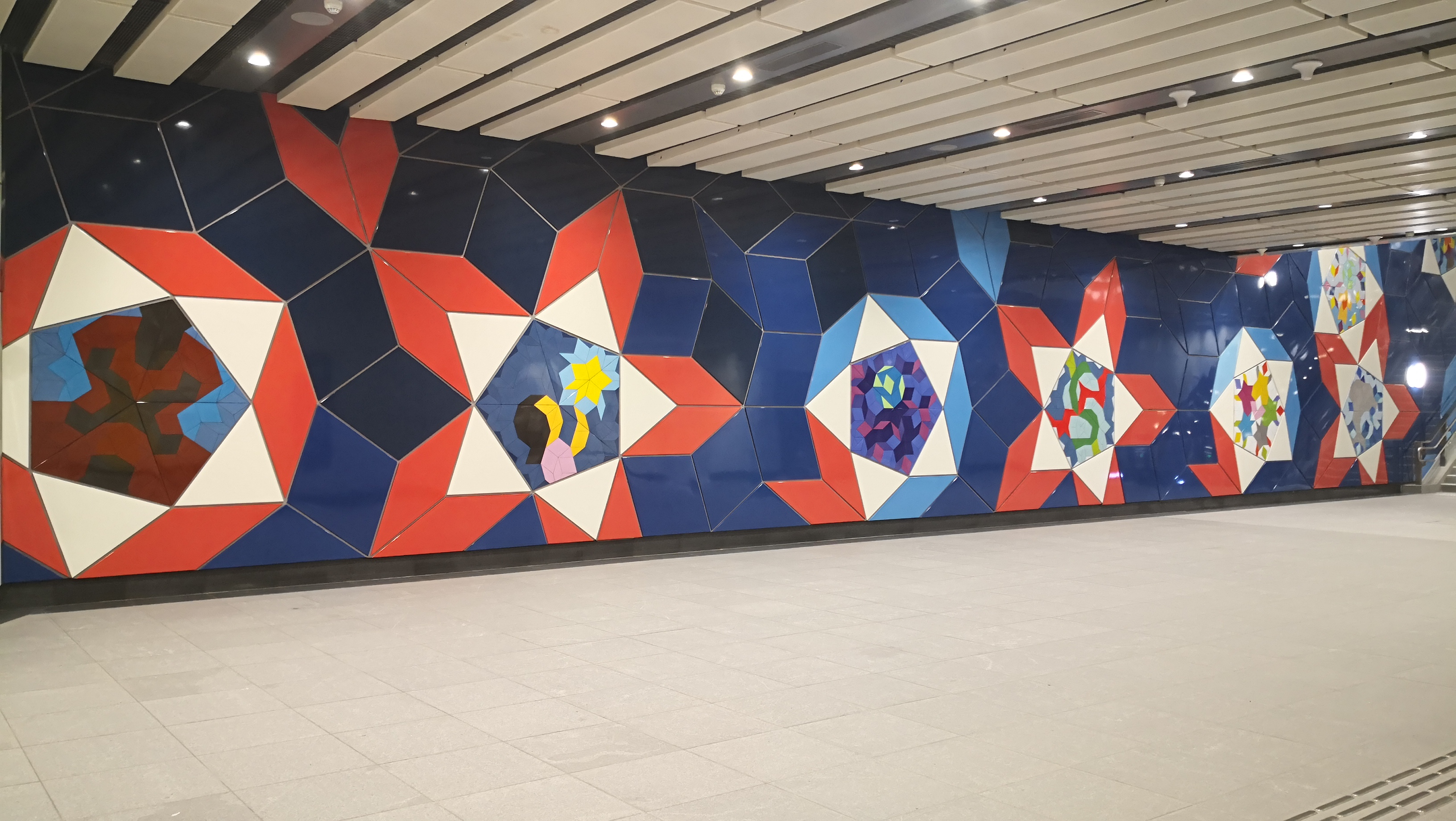
In the corridor
