= Bedok South MRT station =

Future Mass Rapid Transit station in Singapore

Bedok South TE30 勿洛南 பிடோக் சவுத்
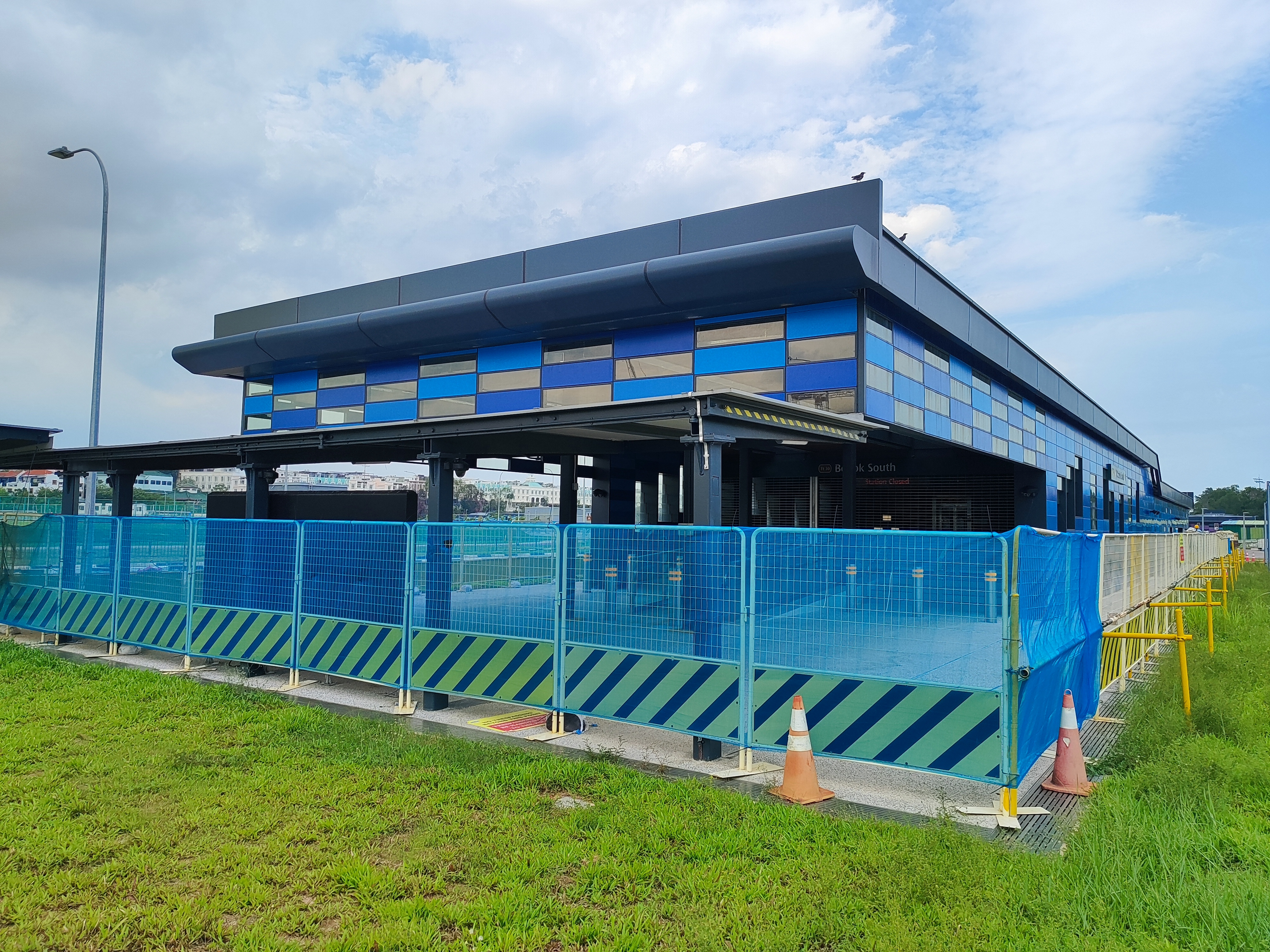
- An entrance of Bedok South station nearing completion

General information
- Location: 620 Upper East Coast Road, Singapore 468324
- Coordinates: 01°19′00″N 103°56′54″E
- System: Future Mass Rapid Transit (MRT) station
- Owner: Land Transport Authority
- Operator: SMRT Trains
- Line: Thomson–East Coast Line
- Platforms: 2 (1 island platform)
- Tracks: 2
- Connections: Upper East Coast; Bedok South (future)

Construction
- Structure type: Underground
- Depth: 22 metres (72 ft)
- Platform levels: 1
- Accessible: Yes

Other information
- Station code: BDS

History
- Opening: 26 December 2026; 43 days' time

Services
Preceding station	Mass Rapid Transit	Following station
Bayshore towards Woodlands North	Thomson–East Coast Line Future service	Sungei Bedok Terminus
Location
- Location within Singapore Rail

Bedok South MRT station is a future underground Mass Rapid Transit (MRT) station on the Thomson–East Coast Line in Bedok planning area, Singapore.

The station will be located next to Temasek Secondary School, at the intersection of Upper East Coast Road and Bedok South Road.

== History ==
On 15 August 2014, LTA announced that Bedok South station would be part of the Thomson–East Coast Line (TEL), Singapore’s 6th MRT line. The station will be constructed as part of Stage 5, consisting of 2 stations between Bedok South and Sungei Bedok, and was expected to be completed in 2024.

Contract T311 for the design and construction of Bedok South Station and associated tunnels was awarded to China Jingye Engineering Corporation Limited (Singapore Branch) for S$188 million in April 2016. Construction started in 2016.

Stage 5 of the TEL was slated to commence passenger service in 2025 instead of 2024 due to the COVID-19 pandemic. Due to challenges of tunnelling near existing critical infrastructure, the station's construction was further delayed to the second half of 2026. The station is now slated to open on 26 December 2026.
