= Kawasaki Heavy Industries & CRRC Qingdao Sifang T251 =

Class of electric multiple units in Singapore

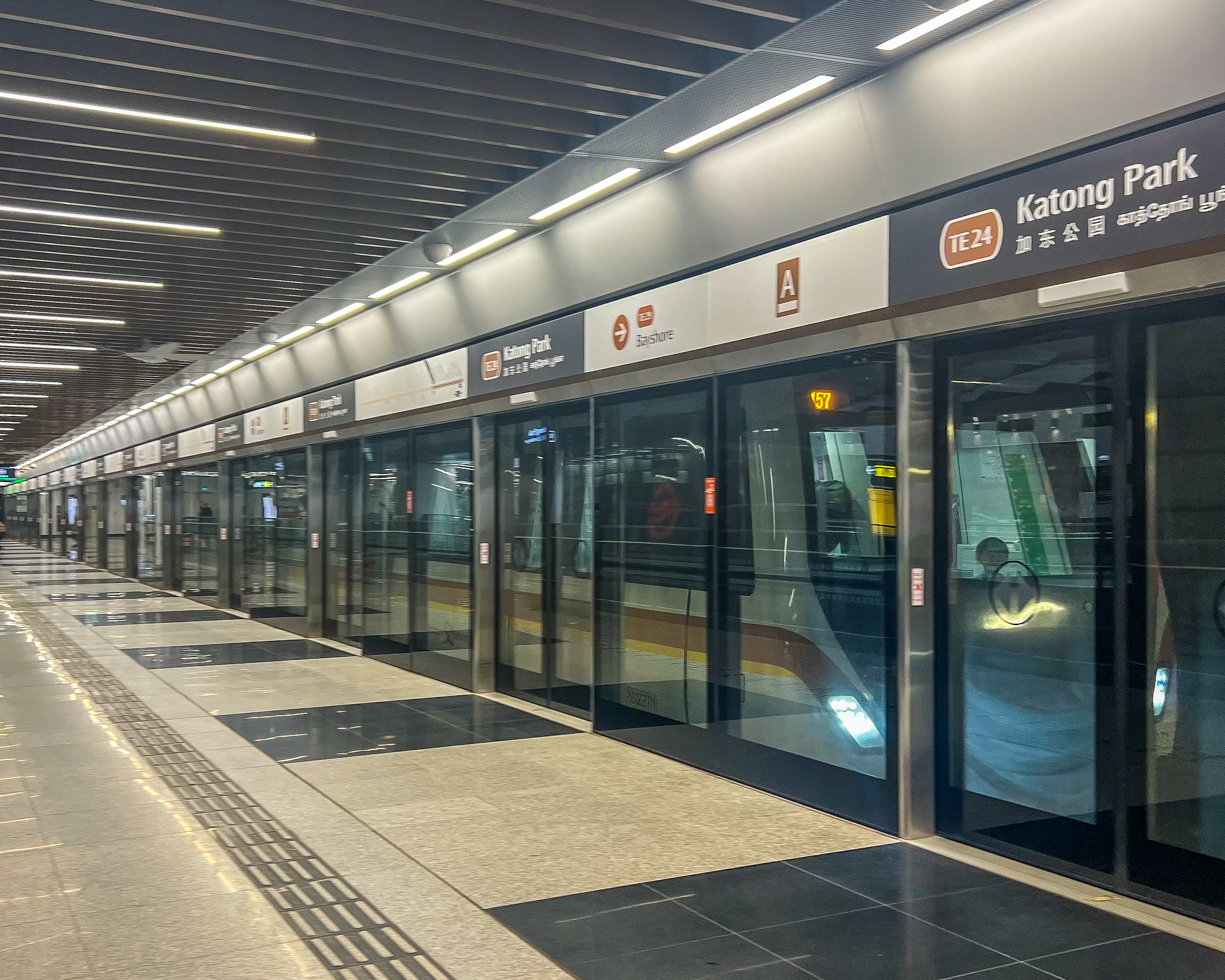
- A T251 train arriving at Katong Park MRT station

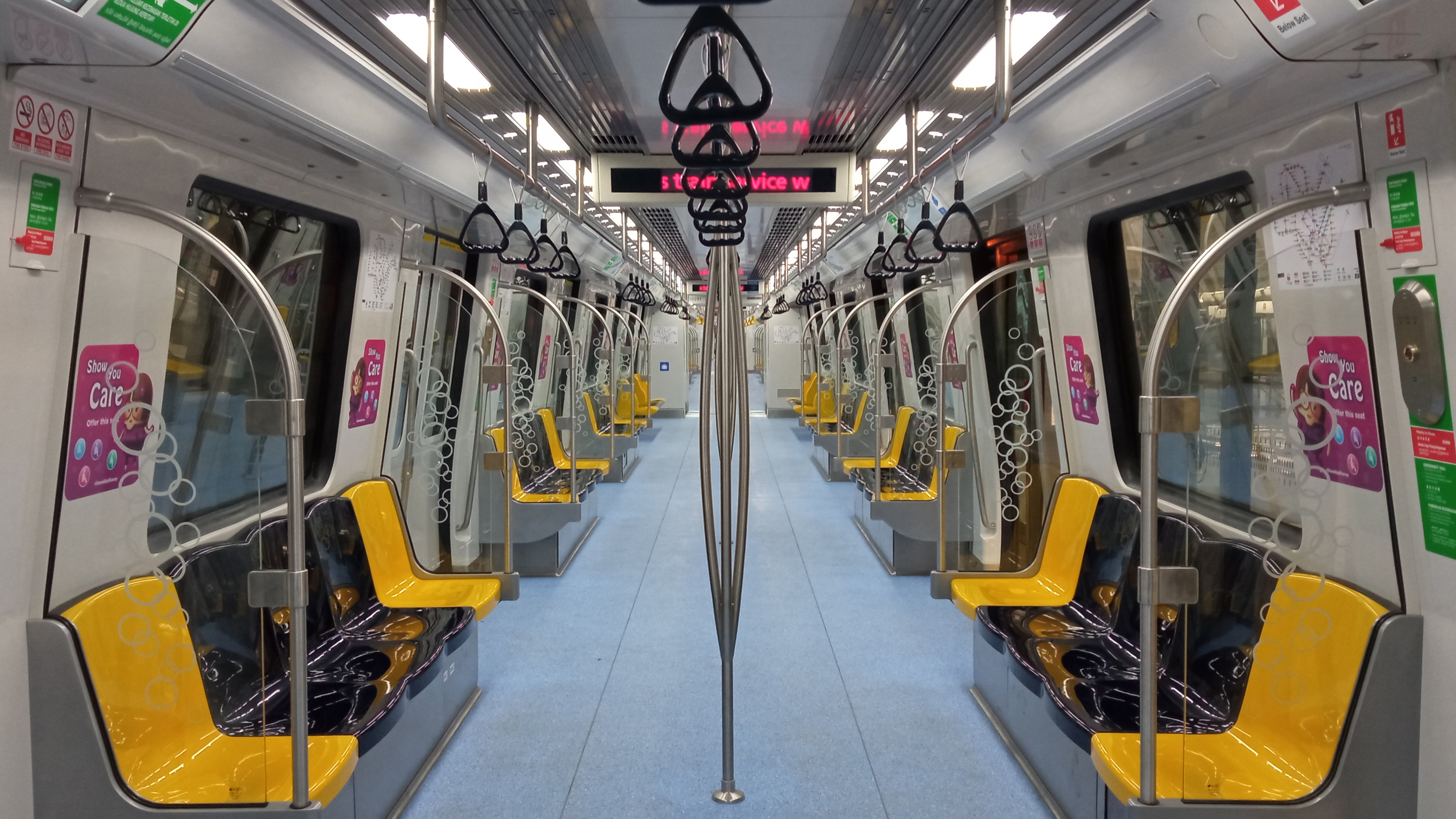
- Interior of one of the driving motor cars.
- Stock type: Electric multiple unit
- In service: 31 January 2020; 6 years ago – Present
- Manufacturers: Kawasaki; CRRC Qingdao Sifang
- Built at: Qingdao, Shandong, China
- Constructed: 2017 – 2022
- Entered service: 31 January 2020; 6 years ago
- Number built: 364 Vehicles (91 Sets)
- Number in service: 280 Vehicles (70 Sets)
- Formation: 4 per trainset DM1–M–T–DM2
- Fleet numbers: 2001 – 2091
- Capacity: 1280 passengers (156 seats)
- Operator: SMRT Trains (SMRT Corporation)
- Depot: Mandai
- Line served: Thomson–East Coast Line

Specifications
- Car body construction: Welded aluminium
- Train length: 92,900 mm (304 ft 9 1/2 in) (with 4 Cars)
- Car length: 23,650 mm (77 ft 7 1/8 in) (DM Over; Couplers): 22,800 mm (74 ft 9 5/8 in) (M/T Over; Couplers)
- Width: 3,200 mm (10 ft 6 in)
- Height: 3,672 mm (12 ft 5/8 in)
- Doors: 1,450 mm (57 1/8 in), 10 per car, 5 per side
- Articulated sections: 4
- Maximum speed: 100 km/h (62 mph) (design); 90 km/h (56 mph) (service)
- Weight: 39,754 kg (87,643 lb) (Fixed Seat DM); 39,257 kg (86,547 lb) (Fixed Seat M); 33,206 kg (73,207 lb) (Fixed Seat T); 39,659 kg (87,433 lb) (Tip-up Seat DM); 39,174 kg (86,364 lb) (Tip-up Seat M); 33,139 kg (73,059 lb) (Tip-up Seat without ATI T); 33,772 kg (74,455 lb) (Tip-up Seat with ATI T)
- Traction system: Mitsubishi Electric MAP-124-75V298 hybrid SiC-IGBT–VVVF
- Traction motors: 12 × Mitsubishi MB-5162-A 120 kW (160 hp) asynchronous 3-phase AC
- Power output: 1.44 MW (1,930 hp)
- Acceleration: 0.95m/s^2 average
- Auxiliaries: Mitsubishi HF-IBT190A IGBT Auxiliary Power Supply Box
- Electric systems: 750 V DC third rail
- Current collection: Collector shoe
- UIC classification: Bo′Bo′+Bo′Bo′+2′2′+Bo′Bo′
- Bogies: Air-suspended, bolsterless bogie
- Safety systems: Alstom Urbalis 400 moving block CBTC ATC under ATO GoA 4 (UTO), with subsystems of ATP, Iconis ATS and Smartlock CBI
- Coupling system: Dellner
- Track gauge: 1,435 mm (4 ft 8 1/2 in) standard gauge

The Kawasaki Heavy Industries & CRRC Qingdao Sifang T251 is the first generation electric multiple unit rolling stock in operation on the Thomson–East Coast line of Singapore's Mass Rapid Transit (MRT) system, manufactured by a consortium of Kawasaki Heavy Industries and CRRC Qingdao Sifang (formerly CSR Qingdao Sifang) under Contract Turnkey 251.

91 four-car medium-capacity trainsets were purchased by LTA for the Thomson-East Coast line in 2014 and the first set was delivered on 25 May 2018.

Seven additional trains were scheduled to be procured for the Johor Bahru–Singapore Rapid Transit System that will connect Malaysia to Singapore, as the Malaysian and Singaporean governments agreed to largely identical technical specifications for both lines. In 2019, Malaysia proposed use of light rail vehicles instead, as part of efforts to cut costs. 8 vehicles were therefore purchased from CRRC Zhuzhou Locomotive Co.

== Tender ==
The tender for trains under the contract turnkey 251 was closed on 15 November 2013 with six bids. The Land Transport Authority has shortlisted all of them and the tender results were published on 28 May 2014.

S/N	Name of Tenderer	Amount (S$)
1	Alstom Transport S.A. / Alstom Transport (S) Pte Ltd Consortium	954,410,000
2	Kawasaki Heavy Industries, Ltd. / Kawasaki Heavy Industries(Singapore) Pte Ltd & CRRC Qingdao Sifang Consortium / Singapore CRRC Sifang Railway Vehicles Service Pte. Ltd. Consortium	749,840,000
3	Hyundai Rotem Company	765,856,000
4	Bombardier (Singapore) Pte Ltd	810,179,619
5	Construcciones y Auxiliar de Ferrocarriles, S.A.	939,645,996
6	CRRC Zhuzhou Locomotive (formerly CSR Zhuzhou Electric Locomotive Co., Ltd.) / Siemens Pte Ltd, Singapore Consortium	849,623,569

Kawasaki will be responsible for the overall project management, design, manufacturing of bogies and procurement of major components. CRRC Qingdao Sifang will be in charge of manufacturing, final fitting and assembly of complete MRT trains and factory testing. Kawasaki (Singapore) will be responsible for the delivery of complete MRT trains to the depot, on-site testing and commissioning.

== Design and features ==
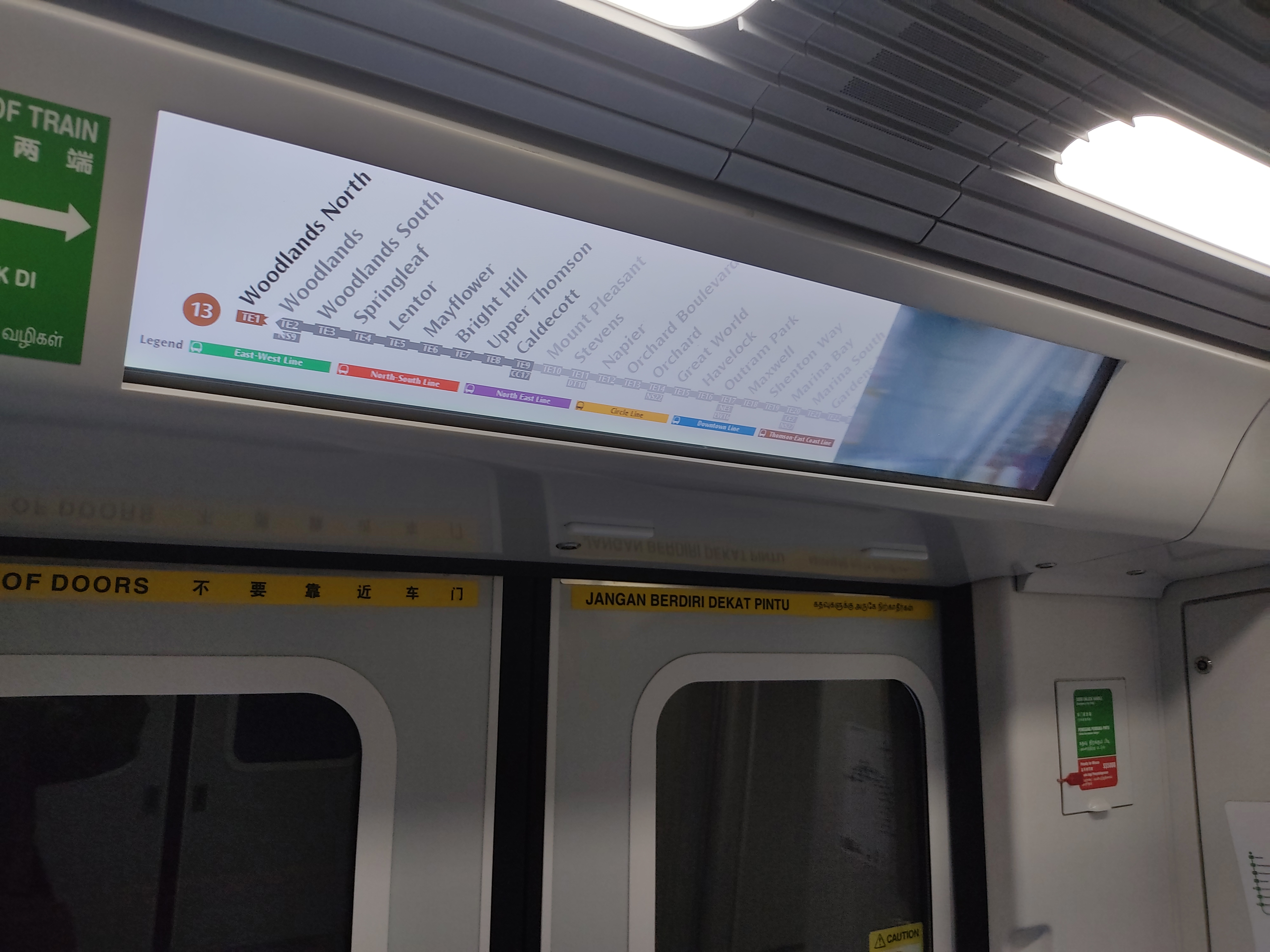
The DRMD on the T251

The tip-up seats on the T251, which have since been disused

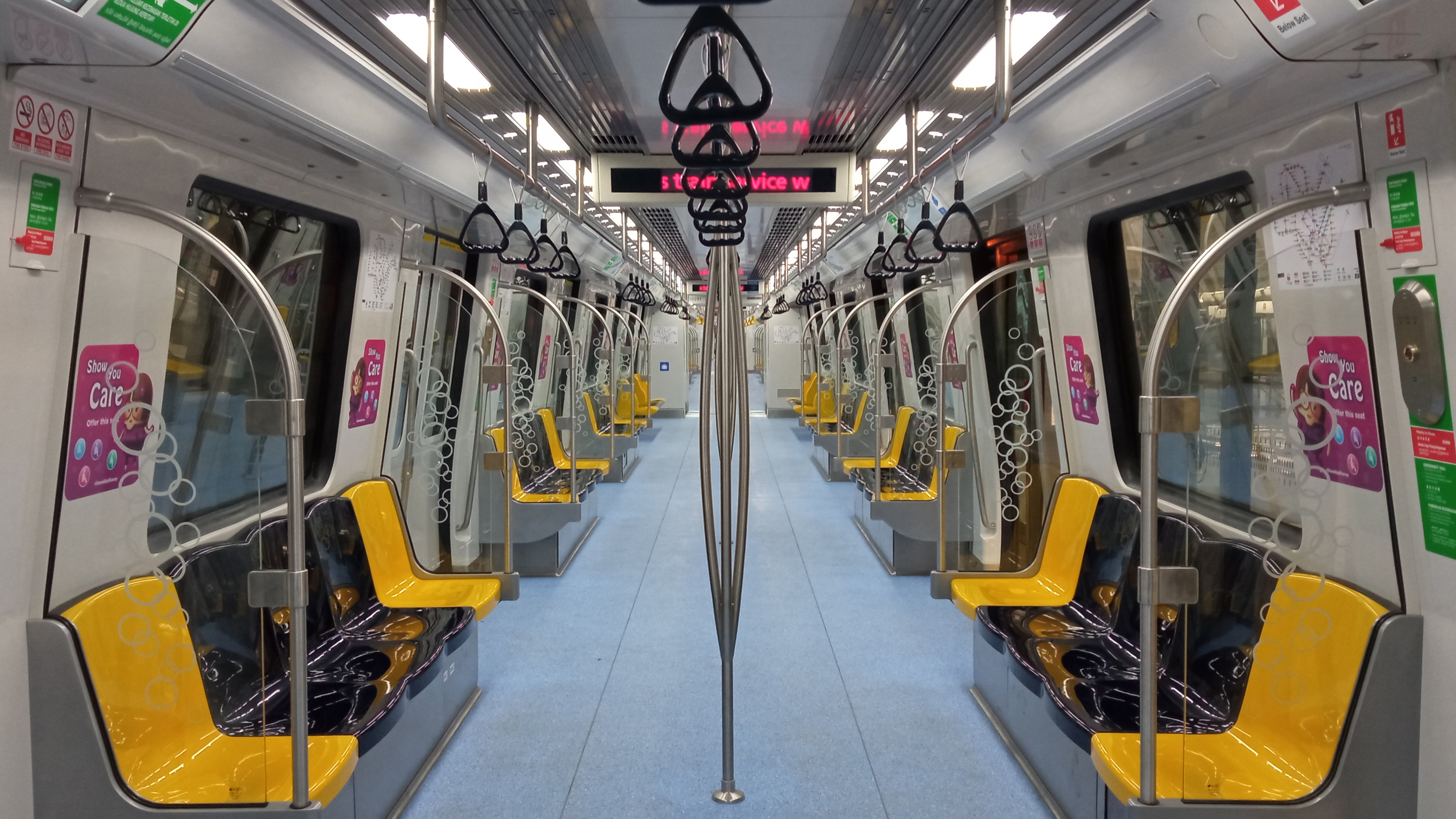
Car 1 interior

Car 2 interior

Car 3 interior

Car 4 interior

The T251 trains have a livery of yellow and burnt sienna stripes running around the cars, similar to C951(A) trains, which bear cerulean blue and blue stripes. They include several features unique to this rolling stock, such as:

- A Dynamic Route Map Display (DRMD), which is termed "Train Vision" and supplied by Mitsubishi Electric;
- Perch seats which are located at the ends of each train car;
- Tip-up seats in 61 of the 91 trainsets (Trainsets 2012 to 2072);
- 10 doors per car (5 per side)

Two of the T251 trains, sets 2012 and 2013 were equipped with automatic track inspection system, found specifically on cars 20123 and 20133. This system includes cameras, lasers, and sensors to detect track defects such as rail cracks, missing fasteners, or foreign objects on the tracks.

== Train formation ==
The coupling configuration of a T251 in revenue service is DM1–M–T–DM2. D stands for "driver's desk", M for "motor" and T for "trailer".

Cars of T251
Car Type	Quantity	Driver Cab	Motor	Collector Shoe	VVVF inverter	Auxiliary power supply	Car Length		Wheelchair Bay
Car Type	Quantity	Driver Cab	Motor	Collector Shoe	VVVF inverter	Auxiliary power supply	m	ft in	Wheelchair Bay
DM	2	✓	✓			✗	23.6	77 ft 5.1 in	✗
M	1	✗	✓			✗	22.8	74 ft 9.6 in	✓
T	1	✗		✓	✗	✓	22.8	74 ft 9.6 in	✓

Kawasaki and CRRC Qingdao Sifang (formerly CSR Qingdao Sifang) built sets 2001 – 2091.

The car numbers of the trains range from 2001x to 2091x, where x depends on the carriage type. Individual cars are assigned a five-digit serial number. A complete four-car trainset consists of one trailer (T), one motor car (M) and two driving motor cars (DM1 & DM2) permanently coupled together.

Car No.	1	2	3	4
Designation	DM1	M	T	DM2
Numbering	20xx1	20xx2	20xx3	20xx4

== Doubts about the consortium ==
The award of the T251 turnkey contract to the Kawasaki & CRRC Qingdao Sifang consortium was briefly politicised in Singapore, when the defects from the relatively new C151A trains constructed by the same consortium were made public on 5 July 2016. This was after Gerald Giam from the Workers' Party commenting through an official Facebook post doubting the decision by the Land Transport Authority to award the subsequent contracts, specifically both the design and supply of C151C and T251 rail cars to the same consortium in 2015. This was despite the Land Transport Authority and operator SMRT Corporation being officially acknowledged on the C151A crack defects as early as 2013.
