= Mandai Depot =

MRT depot in Singapore

Mandai Depot 万礼车厂 Depo Mandai
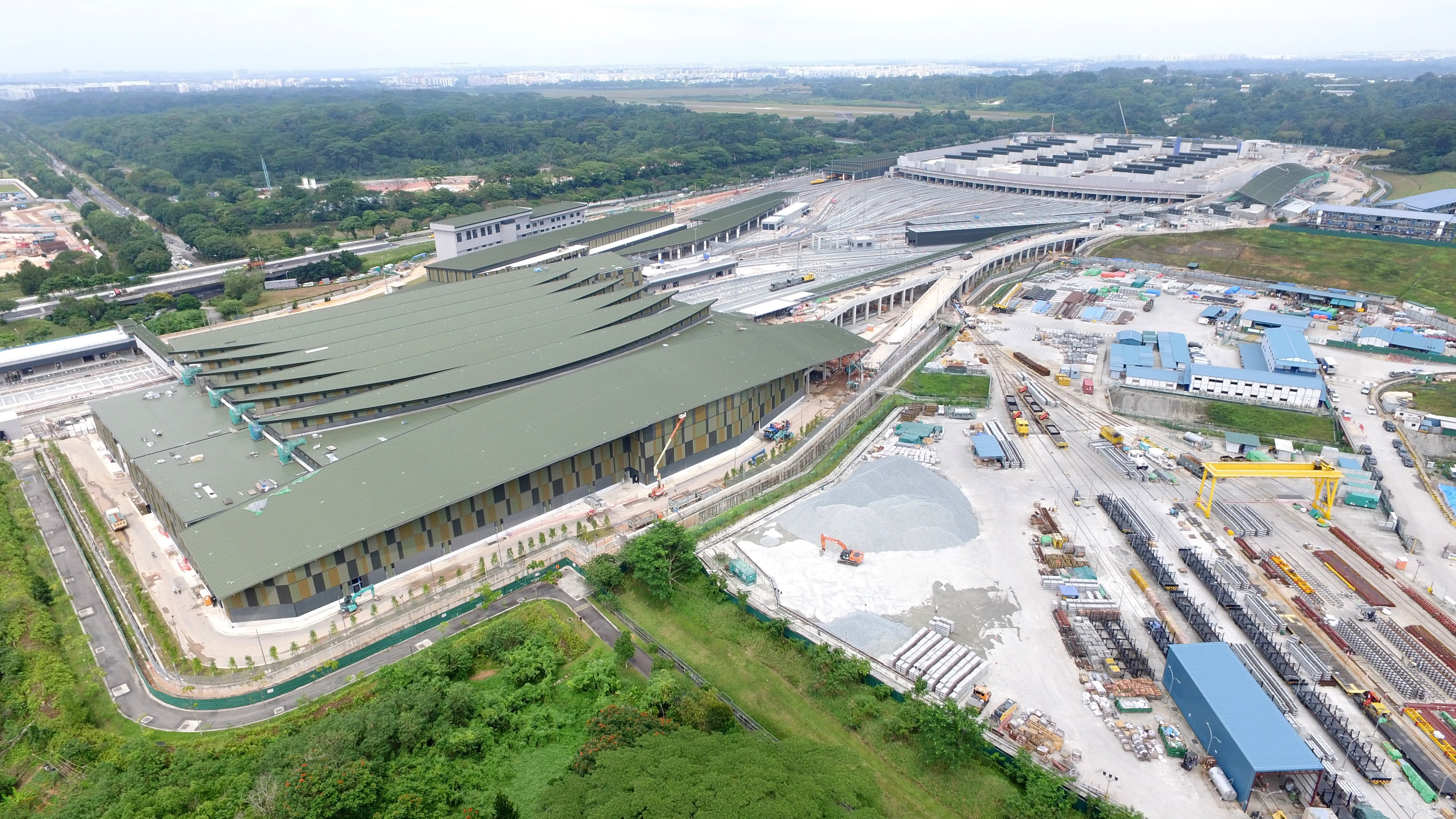
- Mandai Depot nearing completion in March 2018
- Interactive map of Mandai Depot 万礼车厂; Depo Mandai

Location
- Location: 320 Mandai Road, Singapore 779405
- Coordinates: 1.419357°N 103.796960°E

Characteristics
- Owner: Land Transport Authority
- Operator: SMRT Trains Ltd (SMRT Corporation) (Train); Tower Transit Singapore (Bus)
- Depot code: MDD
- Type: At-grade
- Roads: Mandai Road, SLE
- Rolling stock: Kawasaki-Sifang T251
- Routes served: TEL Thomson–East Coast Line

History
- Opened: 31 January 2020; 6 years ago (Train); 4 September 2021; 4 years ago (Bus)

Mandai Depot (Malay: Depo Mandai; Chinese: 万礼车厂) is an integrated train and bus depot located in Mandai, Singapore. The train depot serves as the maintenance and control centre of the Thomson–East Coast Line while the bus depot is used for the Sembawang-Yishun bus package.

The facility is located on a 32 ha (79 acres) site bounded by Mandai Road, Seletar Expressway and Lorong Lada Hitam, on the former site of Orchidville.

The depot is located between Woodlands station and Springleaf station on the Thomson–East Coast Line and has three reception tracks: one track northbound towards Woodlands station and two tracks southbound towards Springleaf station.

== History ==
First announced by the Land Transport Authority on 16 June 2011, construction of the depot commenced at the end of 2012 and is expected to be an at-grade depot. The largest orchid farm, Orchidville, was moved on 11 December 2012 to Sungei Tengah, and construction of the depot had begun in January 2013.

Contract T201 for the construction of Mandai Depot and its associated facilities was awarded to Jurong Primewide Pte Ltd at a sum of S$329 million in October 2013. Construction began in December 2013, with completion in 2019.

Contract T206 for the construction of bored tunnels between Woodlands, Woodlands South and Mandai Depot was awarded to Shanghai Tunnel Engineering Co., Ltd at a sum of S$421 million on 18 October 2013. Construction will start in 2014, with completion in 2020. The contract includes completion of twin bored tunnels between Woodlands and Woodlands South, twin bored tunnels between Woodlands South and crossover tunnels to Mandai Depot, as well as a single bored tunnel between Woodlands and Mandai Depot.

In October 2020, the bus depot was handed over to Tower Transit, which had secured the contract for the Sembawang-Yishun bus package the previous month.

== Design ==
The depot includes a rail administration building, stabling yards, test track, storage warehouses, maintenance workshops and a fully-equipped gym. The administration building will house the Operation Control Centre (OCC) and Depot Control Centre (DCC) for the Thomson–East Coast Line. The stabling yards have a capacity for 90 trains, and stabling capacity supplemented by the East Coast Integrated Depot. The workshops have the capability of servicing and maintaining 11 trains simultaneously. A 66kV substation will be built to support the operation of the TEL.

The bus depot is situated on the roof of the train stabling yard, and provides parking and maintenance facilities for at least 550 buses for the Sembawang-Yishun bus package under Singapore's bus contracting model.
