= Tanjong Rhu MRT station =

Mass Rapid Transit station in Singapore

Tanjong Rhu TE23 丹戎禺 தஞ்சோங் ரூ
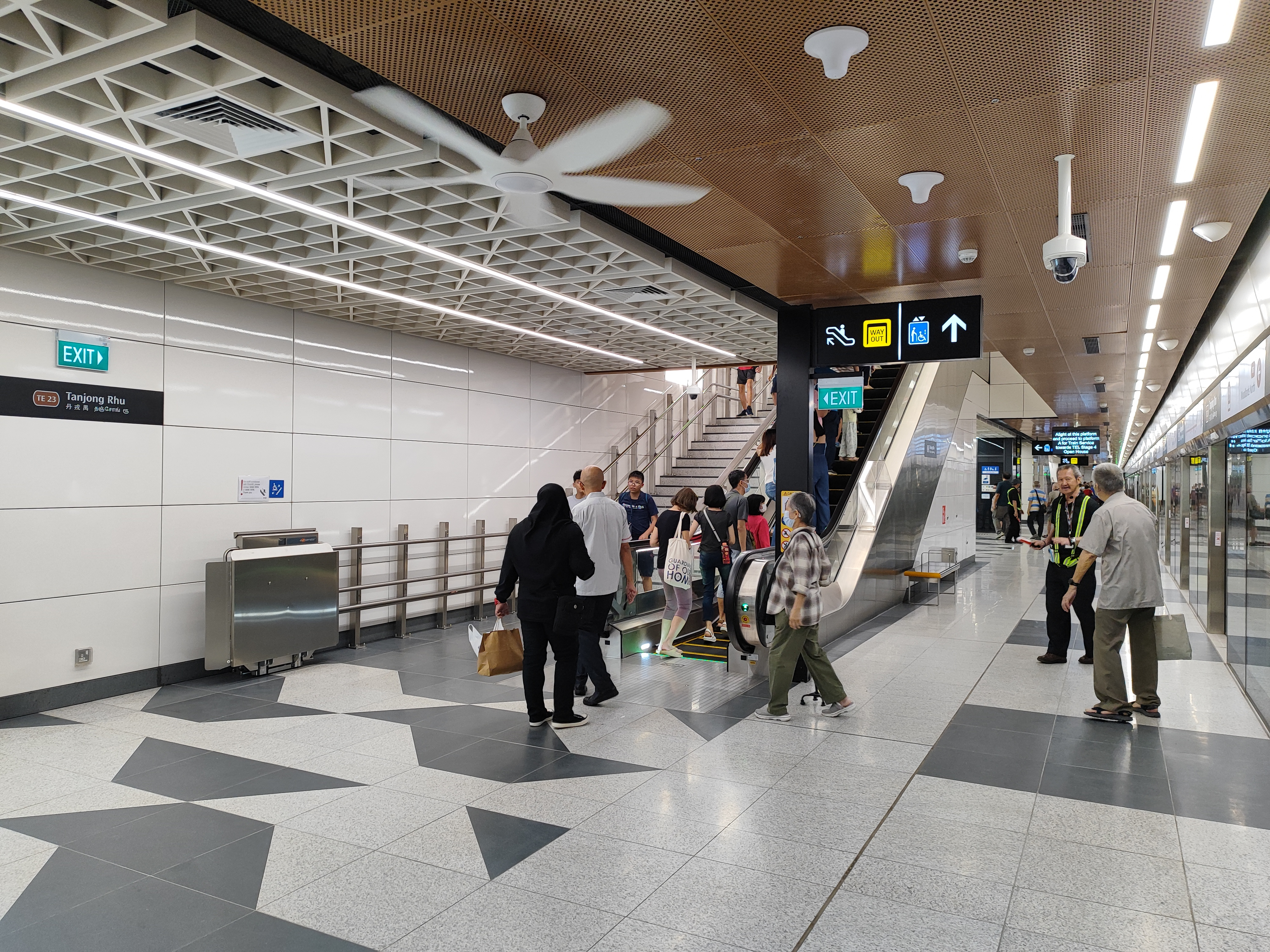
- Platform B of the station

General information
- Location: 2 Tanjong Rhu Place, Singapore 436488
- Coordinates: 01°17′50″N 103°52′24″E
- System: Mass Rapid Transit (MRT) station
- Owner: Land Transport Authority
- Operator: SMRT Trains
- Line: Thomson–East Coast Line
- Platforms: 2 (2 side platforms)
- Tracks: 2
- Connections: Bus, taxi

Construction
- Structure type: Underground
- Depth: 15.3 metres (50 ft)
- Platform levels: 1
- Accessible: Yes

Other information
- Station code: TRH

History
- Opened: 23 June 2024; 2 years ago
- Former names: Sandy Point

Services
| Preceding station | Mass Rapid Transit | Following station |
|---|---|---|
| Gardens by the Bay towards Woodlands North | Thomson–East Coast Line | Katong Park towards Bayshore |
| Founders' Memorial towards Woodlands North | Thomson–East Coast Line Future service | Katong Park towards Bayshore |
Track layout
Location
- Location within Singapore Rail central area

Tanjong Rhu MRT station is an underground Mass Rapid Transit (MRT) station on the Thomson–East Coast Line (TEL) in Kallang, Singapore. Situated at the junction of Tanjong Rhu Road and Tanjong Rhu Place, the station serves nearby condominiums such as Pebble Bay and Casuarina Cove. Other surrounding landmarks include the Tanjong Rhu Lookout Tower, The Kallang and the Tanjong Rhu Footbridge.

First announced in August 2014, Tanjong Rhu station was constructed as part of TEL Phase 4. The cut-and-cover tunnels between Tanjong Rhu and Katong Park were constructed only 37 cm (1.21 ft) above the Kallang–Paya Lebar Expressway. Tanjong Rhu station commenced operations on 23 June 2024. A designated Civil Defence shelter, the two-level station has a side platform configuration and a colour scheme of grey, white and brown. An Art-in-Transit artwork Telinga Ekologi Kita by Bani Haykal is displayed at this station.

== History ==
On 15 August 2014, the Land Transport Authority (LTA) announced that Tanjong Rhu station would be part of the proposed Thomson–East Coast Line (TEL). The station would be constructed as part of Phase 4 (TEL4), consisting of 8 stations from this station to Bayshore. The contract for the design and construction of Tanjong Rhu Station was awarded to a joint venture between Bachy Soletanche Singapore Pte Ltd and Wai Fong Construction Pte Ltd for S$294 million (US$212.8 million) in January 2016. The contract includes the construction of 1 kilometre (0.62 miles) of cut-and-cover tunnels and a substation which will power the TEL tracks. Construction was scheduled to begin in 2016 with a targeted completion date of 2023.

External Images
- Artist's impression of Tanjong Rhu station's interior and exterior

The station was constructed in reclaimed land, which consists of a 9 m (30 ft) layer of sand and backfill above a layer of marine clay. As such, the contractors strengthened the ground through a hybrid technique of wet speed mixing – combining jet grouting and deep soil mixing. The station's diaphragm wall extended 81 m (266 ft) deep, consisting of 135 panels of 1.2 m (3.9 ft) thick. Installation of the diaphragm walls required diverting a drain that ran through the station. Since the utilities could not be fully redirected away from the station site, they were instead routed through the roof space of the tunnel and station box during the excavation phase.

A cut-and-cover tunnel between the Tanjong Rhu and Katong Park stations had to be constructed 37 centimetres (1.21 ft) above the Kallang–Paya Lebar Expressway (KPE) tunnel. This was the only tunnel section on the TEL East Coast segment that was constructed via the cut-and-cover method. Steel sheet piles and barrettes were driven 36 m (118 ft) into the ground to retain the earth and ensure the stability of both tunnels. To minimise ground movement, steel rods were used to stabilise the excavated surface. In February 2020, the station box and tunnels evacuation were completed.

With restrictions imposed on construction due to the COVID-19 pandemic, the TEL4 completion date was pushed by a year to 2024. On 5 March 2024, the LTA announced that the station would open on 23 June that year. An open house for the TEL4 stations was held on 21 June, with a public transport security booth at this station to promote LTA's security campaigns on public transport.

== Details ==
Tanjong Rhu station serves the TEL and is between the Founders' Memorial and Katong Park stations, with an official station code of TE23. As part of the TEL, the station is operated by SMRT Trains. Located at the traffic junction of Tanjong Rhu Road and Tanjong Rhu Place, the station serves the condominiums of Water Place, Pebble Bay, Casuarina Cove, Camelot By-The-Water, Tanjong Ria, Parkshore, and Sanctuary Green condominiums. The station is also near the Tanjong Rhu Lookout Tower and is connected to the Singapore Sports Hub via the Tanjong Rhu Footbridge.

At a depth of 15.3 metres (50 ft), the two-level station has a side platform configuration due to the limited station space. Tanjong Rhu station has a colour scheme of grey, white and brown. Like the other TEL4 stations, hybrid cooling fans at the platform complement the station's air-conditioning to improve air circulation yet lower energy consumption. The station is also a designated Civil Defence Shelter.

Telinga Ekologi Kita by Bani Haykal is displayed at this station as part of the Art-in-Transit programme, a showcase of public artworks on the MRT network. The acoustic panels, resembling honeycombs and circles, references the plant ears that can hear all sounds and voices, hence the artwork title meaning "Our Ecology’s Ears". Haykal was inspired by the British's plans to install acoustic mirrors in Singapore that would detect enemy aircraft during World War I, but this was abandoned due to interference of biophonic activity. The artwork was installed at this station as Haykal believed Tanjong Rhu would have been a possible site for the project.
