= Sungei Bedok MRT station =

Future Mass Rapid Transit station in Singapore

Sungei Bedok DT37 TE31 双溪勿洛 சுங்கை பிடோக்
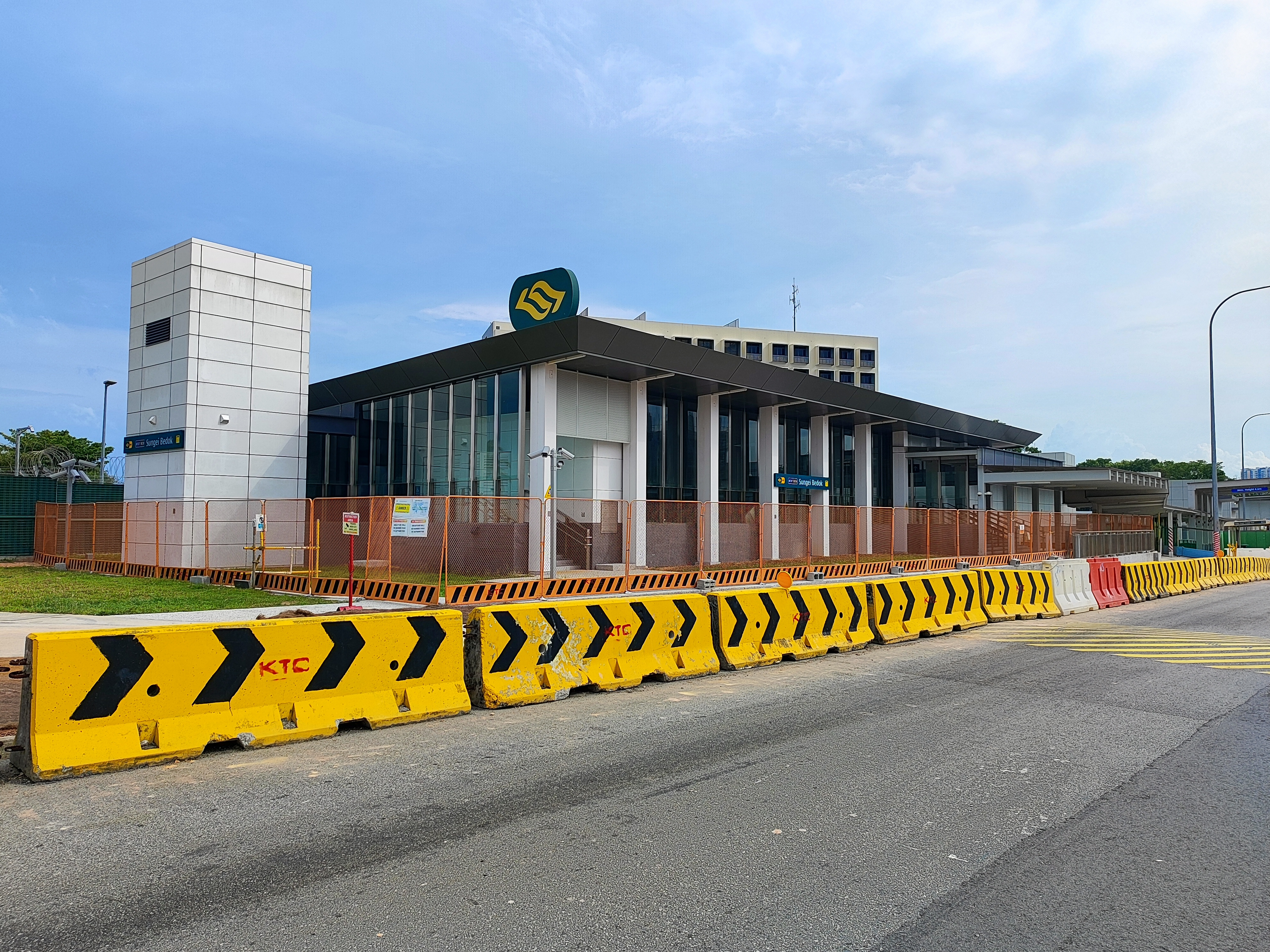
- Construction site of the station in 2026

General information
- Location: 3 Bedok Road, Singapore 469731
- Coordinates: 01°19′13″N 103°57′25″E
- System: Future Mass Rapid Transit (MRT) interchange and terminus
- Owner: Land Transport Authority
- Operator: SBS Transit (Downtown Line); SMRT Trains (Thomson–East Coast Line)
- Line: Downtown Line Thomson–East Coast Line
- Platforms: 4 (2 island platforms)
- Tracks: 4
- Connections: Bus, Taxi

Construction
- Structure type: Underground
- Depth: 27 metres (89 ft)
- Platform levels: 2
- Accessible: Yes

Other information
- Station code: SBD

History
- Opening: 26 December 2026; 43 days' time
- Former names: Eastwood

Services
Preceding station	Mass Rapid Transit	Following station
Xilin towards Bukit Panjang	Downtown Line Future service	Terminus
Bedok South towards Woodlands North	Thomson–East Coast Line Future service	Terminus
Bedok South towards Woodlands North	Thomson–East Coast Line Future service	Changi Terminal 5 towards Tanah Merah
Location
- Location within Singapore Rail

Sungei Bedok MRT station (IPA: /ˈsʊŋaɪ bəˈdoʊk/ SUUNG-eye bə-DOHK) is a future underground Mass Rapid Transit interchange and terminal station on the Downtown Line and Thomson–East Coast Line in Bedok planning area, Singapore. The station is being built east of where Upper East Coast Road becomes Bedok Road, and will serve residents of the Eastwood estate. Nearby facilities include the Bedok Food Centre, Eastwood Centre and the Laguna National Golf & Country Club.

== History ==
This station was first announced on 15 August 2014 as part of the Downtown Line stage 3e, consisting of 2 stations between Xilin and Sungei Bedok, and the Thomson–East Coast Line phase 5, also consisting of 2 stations between Bedok South and Sungei Bedok MRT. It was expected to be completed in 2024, in tandem with the adjacent East Coast Integrated Depot. However, due to the COVID-19 pandemic, this station was expected to commence passenger service in 2025 instead. Due to challenges of tunnelling near existing critical infrastructure, the station is expected to commence passenger service on 26 December 2026.

While serving as the future eastern terminus of the Downtown Line, it will also serve as the eastern terminus of the Thomson–East Coast Line until 2040, which will be extended to Changi Airport Terminal 5 and existing Changi Airport stations, before terminating at Tanah Merah.

Contract T312 for the design and construction of Sungei Bedok Station and associated tunnels was awarded to KTC Civil Engineering & Construction Pte Ltd for S$418 million in June 2016. Construction began in 2016.
