= Xilin MRT station =

Future Mass Rapid Transit station in Singapore

Xilin DT36 锡林 ஸீலின்
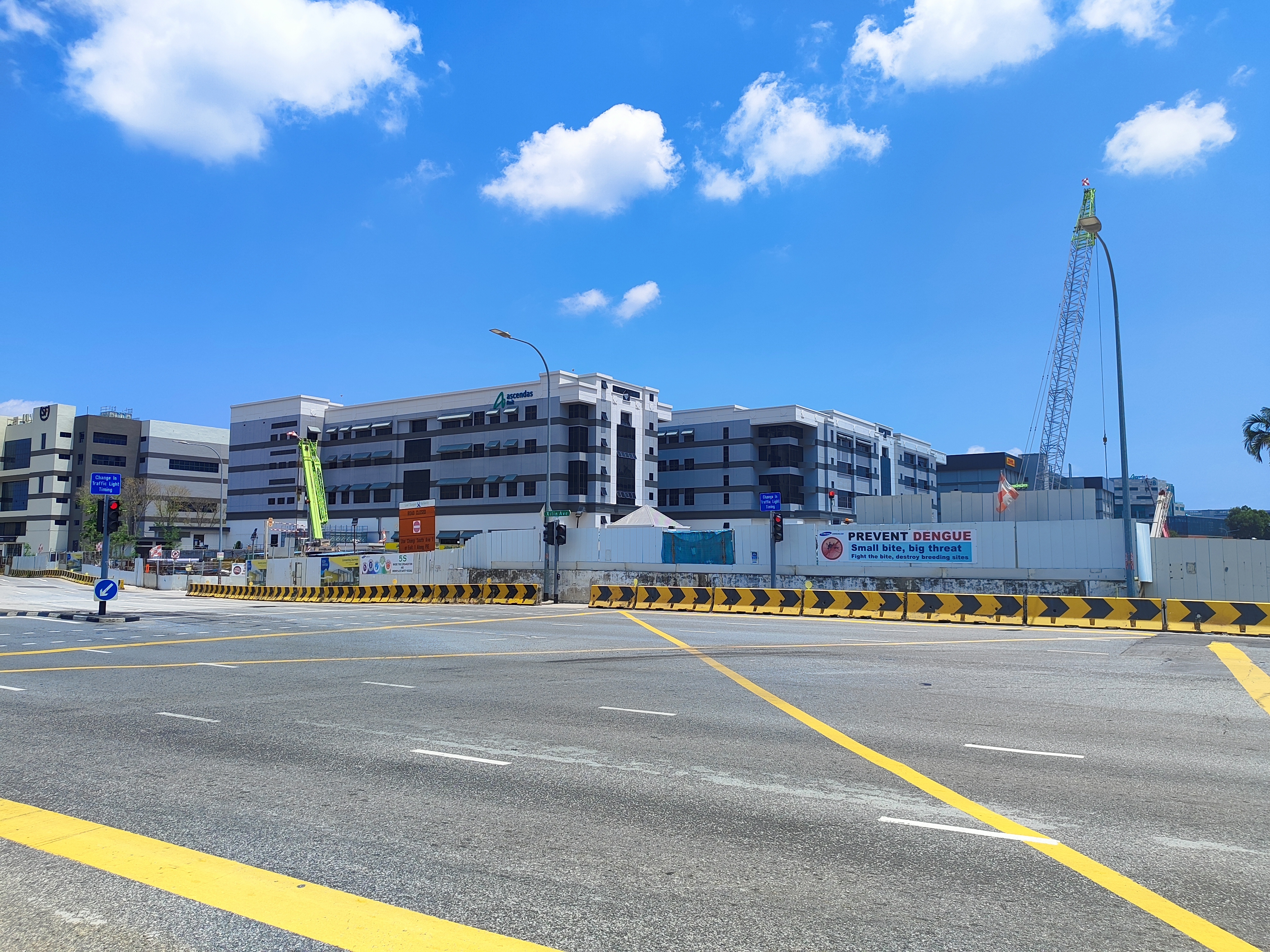
- Construction site of the station

General information
- Location: 301 Xilin Avenue, Singapore 486800
- Coordinates: 01°19′44″N 103°57′54″E
- System: Future Mass Rapid Transit (MRT) station
- Owner: Land Transport Authority
- Operator: SBS Transit
- Line: Downtown Line
- Platforms: 2 (1 island platform)
- Tracks: 2
- Connections: Bus, Taxi

Construction
- Structure type: Underground
- Depth: 25 metres (82 ft)
- Platform levels: 1
- Parking: Yes
- Cycle facilities: Yes
- Accessible: Yes

Other information
- Station code: XLN

History
- Opening: 26 December 2026; 51 days' time
- Former names: Changi South

Services
Preceding station	Mass Rapid Transit	Following station
Expo towards Bukit Panjang	Downtown Line Future service	Sungei Bedok Terminus
Location
- Location within Singapore Rail

Xilin MRT station is a future underground Mass Rapid Transit station on the Downtown Line in Singapore. Located in the Xilin subzone of Tampines, the station serves industries around Changi South, as well as the nearby Tanah Merah Country Club. The station is placed at the junction of Xilin Avenue, Changi South Avenue 3 and Laguna Golf Green.

== History ==
The extension to the Downtown Line was first announced during the revealing of the Land Transport Master Plan 2013 on 17 January 2013. The line will be extended to what was known as the Eastern Region Line (presently the Thomson–East Coast Line) by 2024, so as to enhance the accessibility between the two rail lines and allow commuters to conveniently make transfers.

This station was first announced on 15 August 2014 as part of the Downtown Line stage 3e, consisting of 2 stations between Xilin and Sungei Bedok, and was expected to be completed in 2024 in tandem with the adjacent East Coast Integrated Depot. Contract T313 for the design and construction of Xilin Station and associated tunnels was awarded to Samsung C&T Corporation for S$834 million on 21 March 2016. To facilitate the construction of the station, part of Changi South Avenue 3 between Xilin Avenue and Changi South Avenue 2 will be temporarily closed to traffic from 31 January 2017.

Following challenges of tunnelling near existing critical infrastructure, the station's construction was further delayed to 2026. On 4 November 2026, it was announced that the station is scheduled to open on 26 December of that year.
