= East Coast Road, Singapore =

Road in Singapore

East Coast Road
- 东海岸路 (Chinese); Jalan Pantai Timur (Malay); Upper East Coast Road
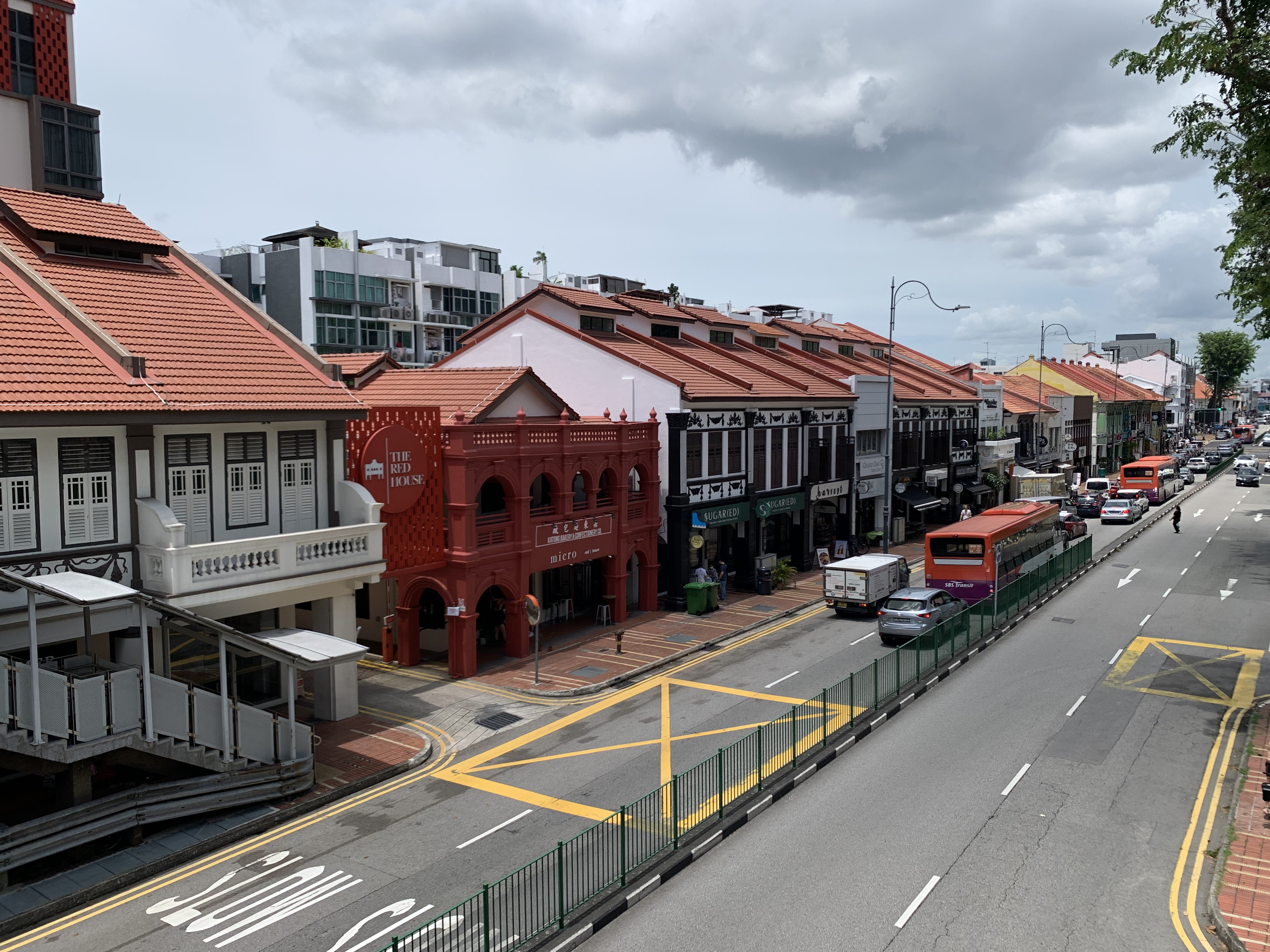
- Type: Major Road
- Length: 2.8 km (1.7 mi)
- From: Mountbatten Road
- To: Upper East Coast Road

East Coast Road (Chinese: 东海岸路; Malay: Jalan Pantai Timur) is a major two-way road in eastern Singapore. As its name suggests, the road used to run along Singapore's southeastern coastline before extensive land reclamation shifted the coastline southwards. The road starts in the west as Mountbatten Road, then continues eastwards - after the Haig Road and Amber Road junction - as East Coast Road. Moving further eastwards, the road continues as Upper East Coast Road (Chinese: 东海岸路上段) before making a turn northwards to continue as Bedok Road. Both Upper East Coast Road and East Coast Road are four lanes wide for their entire length, except in between Joo Chiat Road and Still Road, where street-side parking is allowed in the outer lane in both directions.

== Route Description ==
East Coast Road begins in Katong near the front of the historic Katong Shopping Centre. The first major road East Coast Road meets is the historic Joo Chiat Road. This section of both roads are lined with historic shophouses. After meeting Still Road and Telok Kurau Road, East Coast Road passes in front of Saint Patrick's School, before meeting Frankel Avenue, which signals the roads entrance into Siglap. After meeting Siglap Road, the road passes through a dense commercial area, where it turns into Upper East Coast Road. Upper East Coast Road then continues from East Coast Road meeting Bedok South Avenue 1, before passing through Bayshore. After the junction with Bedok South Avenue 3, the road passes Temasek Secondary School and the under-construction Bedok South MRT station, the terminus of Bedok South Road, and Upper East Coast Bus Terminal, before ending at the historic Bedok Corner near Sungei Bedok MRT station, forming a T-junction between Upper East Coast Road, Bedok Road and Laguna Golf Green, allowing direct access to Tanah Merah MRT station, Upper Changi Road and Changi Business Park.

== History ==
East Coast Road was first mentioned in the Jackson Plan, published in 1822 where Stamford Raffles recommended for designated roads on both ends of the island as West Coast Road and East Coast Road, making East Coast Road one of the first delineated roads of Singapore. It was not until 1902 where East Coast Road was actually constructed as a laterite road connecting Katong and Bedok. Prior to the construction of the road, the only way to access Geylang and Joo Chiat was to go through Geylang Road and Tanjong Katong Road. In 1906, works to extend the road to Tanjong Katong Road began, which introduced new modes of transport such as mosquito buses, motor trolleys, and trams into the then rural area. This transformed business and life in the area. When East Coast Road was near the sea, it was popular with the rich who built seaside bungalows near the road. With the construction of the Thomson-East Coast Line, the remaining two lane segment of Upper East Coast Road east of Bedok South Road was upgraded to four lanes, and even six lanes in certain areas.

== Future ==
The section from Upper East Coast Bus Terminal to Bedok South Avenue 1 suffers from chronic congestion and traffic jams in the morning peak period, due to the Bedok South Avenue 1 interchange with the East Coast Parkway being the only convenient way for drivers in the region to join the westbound ECP. However, with the construction of the Bayshore Estate, a new interchange with complete access to the ECP behind Temasek Secondary School will be constructed, alleviating congestion along Upper East Coast Road,

== Details ==
East Coast Road's name was derived from its proximity to the coast.

=== Landmarks ===
The following is a list of landmarks that are/were on East Coast Road/Upper East Coast Road:

- I12 Katong: a shopping mall
- Tay Buan Guan Supermarket: one of Singapore's first supermarkets
- Roxy Cinema: a popular cinema during the 1930's. It was replaced by Roxy Square, a shopping centre.
- Saint Patrick's School: a secondary school located off East Coast Road
- Temasek Secondary School: a secondary school located along Upper East Coast Road
- Bedok South MRT station: an under-testing MRT station on the Thomson-East Coast Line
- Upper East Coast Bus Terminal: a bus terminal located along Upper East Coast Road
- Sungei Bedok MRT station: an under-testing MRT station on the Thomson-East Coast and Downtown Line.
