= Chin Mee Chin Confectionery =

Historic kopitiam in Singapore

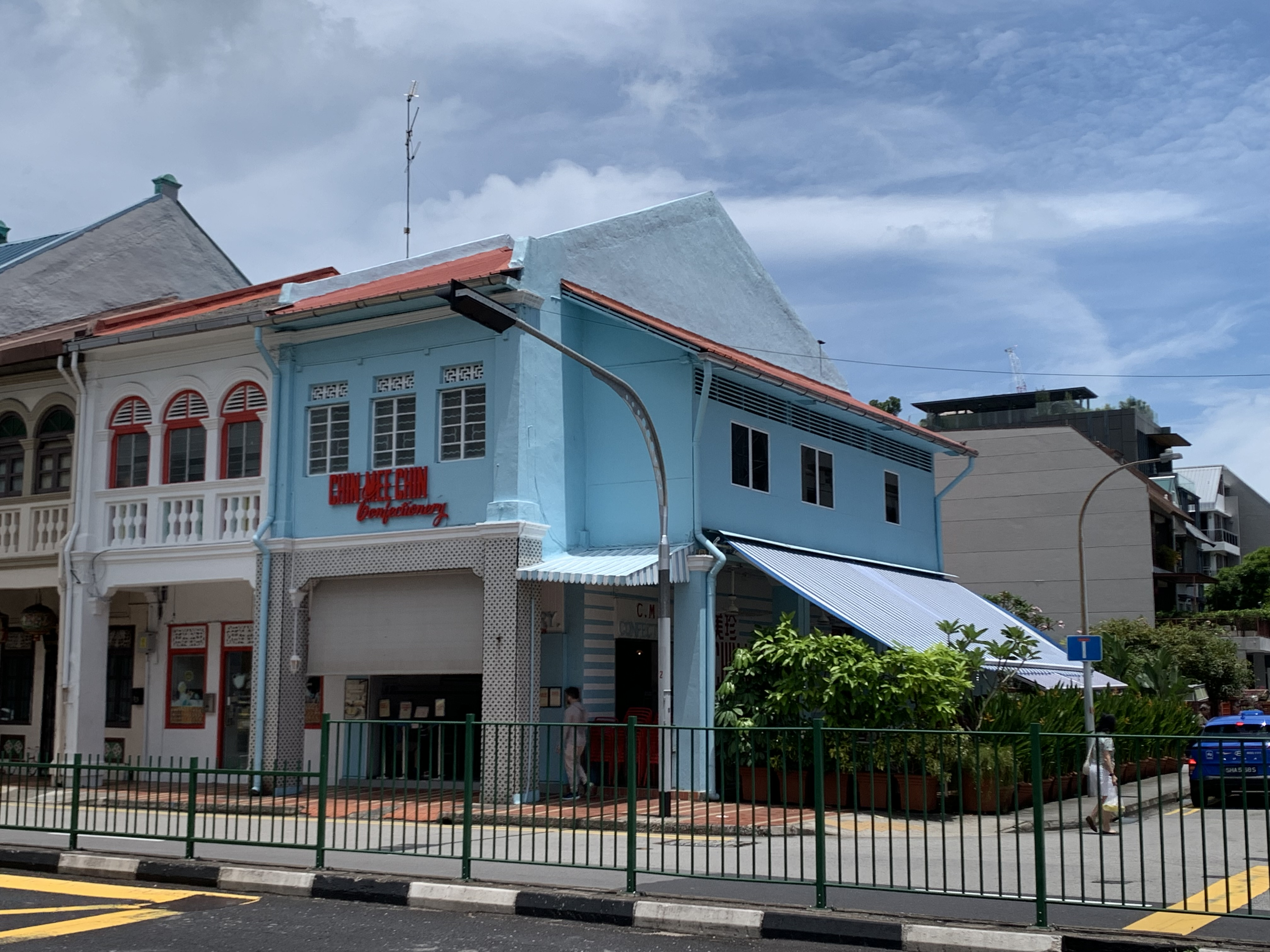
- Chin Mee Chin Confectionery in 2025
- Interactive map of Chin Mee Chin Confectionery

Restaurant information
- Established: 1920 (business), 1925 (physical building)
- Owners: Ebb & Flow Group
- Previous owner: Tan Family
- Pastry chef: Maxine Ngooi
- Food type: Peranakan and Eurasian pastries
- Location: 204 East Coast Road, Singapore, 428903, Singapore
- Coordinates: 1°18′26″N 103°54′26″E
- Seating capacity: 60
- Website: https://www.chinmeechin.sg

Chin Mee Chin Confectionery (Chinese: 真美珍; HTS: zian^{1}mui^{3}zian^{1}; colloquially known as CMC) is a kopitiam (coffee shop) in Katong, Singapore. Located at 204 East Coast Road, Chin Mee Chin started as a bread delivery business in the 1920s by Hainanese native Tan Hui Dong before becoming a kopitiam in 1925 by renting 204 East Coast Road. The business was taken over by Hui Dong's son Tan Joo Long in 1947 following his father's death in Sook Ching. Joo Long expanded the business by serving other foodstuff and fully purchasing the building as well as giving the name 'Chin Mee Chin' (meaning "genuine, beautiful treasures" in Chinese).

Following an increase in Eurasians living near the Joo Chiat Road during the 1970s, Chin Mee Chin decided to appeal to them by serving Eurasian confectionary, which would later become staples on their menu. In 2021, the food and beverage company, Ebb & Flow, acquired Chin Mee Chin and restored and reopened it after it was closed down in 2018 due to a lack of staffing and family support. The building has a distinctive blue façade.

== History ==
=== 20th century ===
Chin Mee Chin Confectionery was started in the 1920s as an unnamed bread delivery business by Tan Hui Dong (Chinese: 陈会栋), a native of Keng Hai County, Hainan Island. Tan (along with his clansmen) delivered bread to Peranakan households in the Joo Chiat area. In 1925, Tan became a shareholder of a building owned by Hainanese proprietors on East Coast Road for his business, which would later become the Chin Mee Chin Confectionery Shop. However, Tan died in February 1942 during the Japanese occupation of Singapore. He was rounded up by Japanese soldiers after leaving his home to acquire new documentation from the Japanese Empire. Following his death, the business was run by Tan's clansmen.

The business was taken over by Tan's son (then aged 25), Tan Joo Long (Chinese: 陈永镇; alternatively spelled as Tan Joon Ling) in 1947 after arriving from Hainan island. He named his father's business 'Chin Mee Chin Confectionery' (Chinese for "genuine, beautiful treasures"). The younger Tan expanded the business by serving other cake, pastries, and buns as well as purchasing the building that Chin Mee Chin was renting from the owners for the business's longevity. During the 1970s, there was a growth of a Eurasian community in the Joo Chiat area. To attract Eurasians to the kopitiam, Chin Mee Chin started serving Eurasian confectionary such as sugee cakes and cream horns.

=== 21st century ===
On 25 July 2009, Tan Joo Long died at the age of 87, according to his son William Tan Chiew Duan. In 2018, Chin Mee Chin Confectionery closed down due to a lack of staffing and family support.

In 2021, Food and beverages company Ebb & Flow Group revived and took over the Chin Mee Chin Confectionery. Co-founder and chief executive officer of Ebb & Flow Chun Lim Kian grew up on the street behind the bakery, and was neighbors with the Tan family. Negotiations with the Tan family began in January 2020 and ended in July of the same year. However, due to the COVID-19 pandemic in Singapore, the opening was delayed to March 2021. It was further delayed until 15 September of the same year as contrary to the popular belief of construction issues, it was actually gastronomical issues that delayed the opening, with Chun saying that “Honestly, it was a lot harder than we thought it would be to recreate that old-school feel, ...there were no real recipes for the dishes so there was a lot of trial and error involved. We’ve had to tweak some things to modernise them a bit… We’ve expanded the kitchen because this is quite a large operation now and we’ve also expanded the menu… so those things took time.”

== Details ==
The Chin Mee Chin confectionery is located at 204 East Coast Road in Katong, Marine Parade, Singapore. The physical building has a pale blue façade with the "iconic" signboard of the business' name. It also has an alfresco section and a "colourful retro-style mural" on the exterior walls. The interior of the building has a mosaic green-coloured floor and wall tiles with a "retro" horse painting hanging on the wall. It has "marble-topped tables" and its "classic coffee shop chairs" that occupy the front portion of the premises as well as a "five foot way facing the [nearby] church". The kitchen has gone through several changes over Chin Mee Chin's history. When Tan Joo Long took over the business, he and his staff used bricks and a metal sheet found at the back of the shop to create a makeshift urn and oven. Chin Mee Chin also has a charcoal grill where they toast their buns. At some point before their closure, they stopped using it but it was brought back by Ebb & Flow.

=== Dishes ===
The kopitiam is often noted for its kaya toast, a toast made from kaya, which is a jam made from coconut milk, eggs, and sugar. Chin Mee Chin's kaya has been described by Annette Tan of Today as "Jade-hued" as well as being "not too sweet, not too smooth and redolent of coconut milk" whilst its buns curated by Ebb & Flow are "split and toasted over charcoal" and "squishier than before but as close as it gets".
