= Roxy Cinema =

Roxy Cinema may refer to:

- Roxy Cinema (Kolkata), India
- Roxy Cinema (Singapore)
- Roxy Cinema, Barrow-in-Furness, England
