= Roxy Cinema (Singapore) =

Former movie theatre in Singapore

- Roxy Theatre
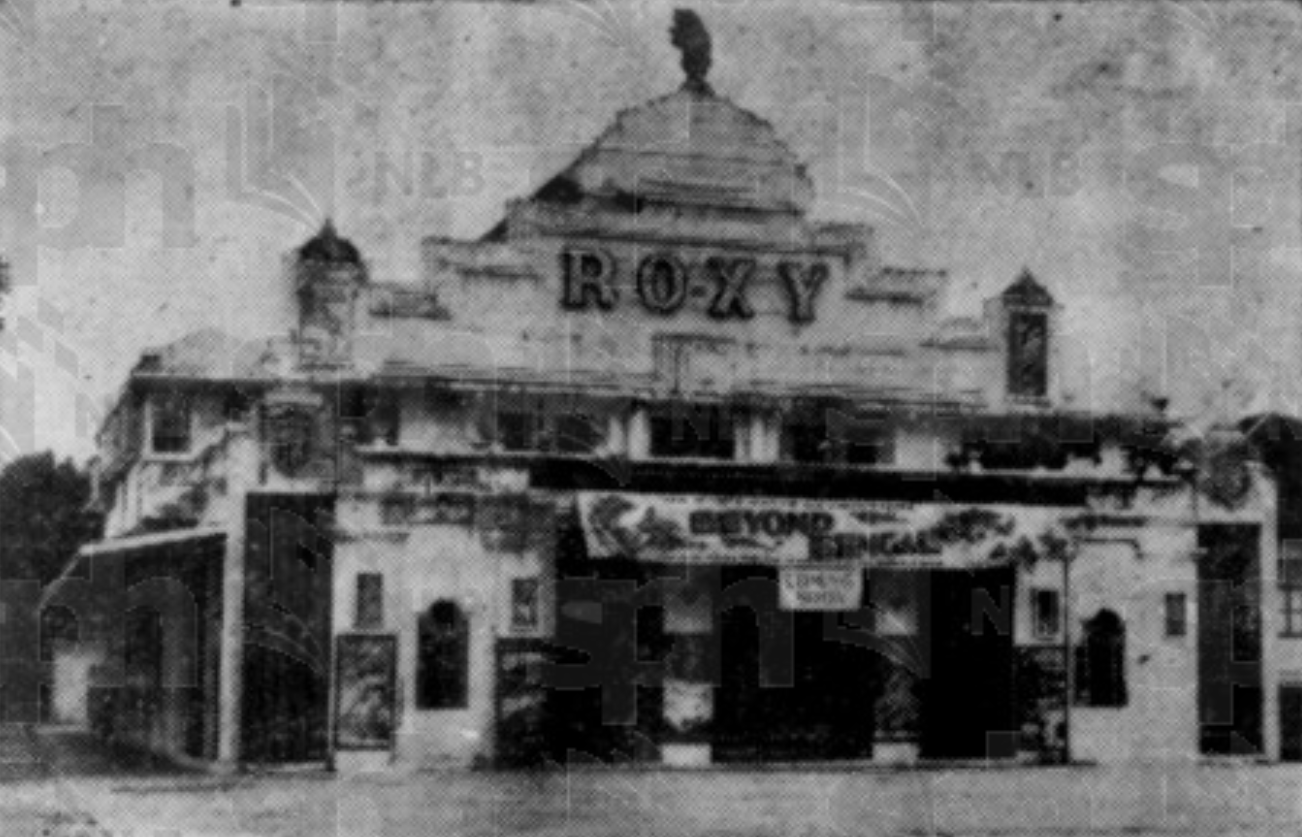
- The cinema in 1934
- Interactive map of Roxy Cinema
- Address: Singapore
- Coordinates: 1.304798°N 103.903716°E
- Owner: Low Peng Soy
- Operator: Shaw Brothers
- Capacity: 1,200

Construction
- Opened: 17 February 1931
- Renovated: 1957
- Closed: 1978
- Cost: 100,000
- Architects: Messrs. Lim and Seah architects

Roxy Cinema, also known as Roxy Theatre, was a movie theatre in Katong, Marine Parade, Singapore. Opened on 17 February 1931, it was built by Messrs. Lim and Seah architects. Owned and initially operated by Low Peng Soy, it was operated by the Shaw Brothers Studio from the early 1970's.

The cinema closed on 1 August 1978.

== History ==
On 17 February 1931, Roxy Cinema was opened by Low Peng Soy (a descendant of the largest developer of Emerald Hill, Low Koon Yee) at a cost of S$100,000 to build. The theatre was designed by Messr. Lim and Seah architects.

The first movie to play in Roxy Cinema was reportedly Buck Jones, an all-talking Western romance followed by Cheer Up and Smile, a musical starring Dixie Lee, Whispering Jack Smith, and Olga Baclanova. Roxy cinema grew to be popular with those living in Katong, especially with its Saturday night screenings. As a result, a black market emerged selling tickets for much higher prices for sold out movies. Weekend morning shows were equally popular such that informal reservation of seats were done by tying handkerchiefs to the seats.

On 20 February 1940, the management of Roxy Cinema celebrated their ninth anniversary with a party at the Café de Luxe, inviting friends and representatives of film companies to it.

On 12 January 1952, the film Father of the Bride was shown in aid of the Mount Erskine Boys' Club.

On 27 December 1957, Roxy Cinema was reopened after renovations were done to add air conditioning to the movie theatre, with Commissioner General for South East Asia, Robert Scott, officially reopening the movie theatre. A premiere of Oh my Papa was played, with proceeds for the movies showing during the opening night were donated to Canosa Convent Primary School.

In the early 1970s, the cinema was acquired by the Shaw Brothers. It was designated as a 'second-run' English film hall where whilst the movie theatres are less modern than 'first-run' movie, they are cheaper compared to their counterparts. Additionally, 'second-run' theatres play smaller/older English language films. Roxy Cinema was later converted to a 'first-run' Chinese film hall in the 1970s.

In July 1977, the land for Roxy Cinema was sold by Shaw Brothers and on 1 August 1978, Roxy Cinema was closed down. It was replaced by Roxy Square, a S$77 million shopping mall that was completed in 1984 along with the Roxy Century Park Hotel, a hotel that is part of the Roxy Square shopping centre.

== Details ==
The Roxy Cinema was located on the junction of East Coast Road and Brooke Road. It stood opposite of the Red House Bakery, a popular bakery during Roxy Cinema's day. The movie theatre had a concrete car park at the front of the theatre. As for the movie theatre itself, the building was built in a colonial-style architecture with an interior colour scheme of dark and light shades of green. The auditorium had a seating capacity of 1,200 persons and a Western Electric sound system.

Roxy Cinema's only ventilation were ceiling fans. Additionally, it was not uncommon for the movie theatre to have black-outs. Despite the frequency of blackouts and the ventilation, the zeal of the moviegoers continued as Roxy Cinema's doors would be open to let fresh air in. It was frequent for many patrons of Roxy Cinema after watching a movie to dine at La Polma, a Chinese restaurant next to Roxy Cinema. There were also stalls outside the theatre selling laksa, satay, mee siam, ice-water, and seafood.
