= Mee siam mai hum =

2006 phrase by Lee Hsien Loong

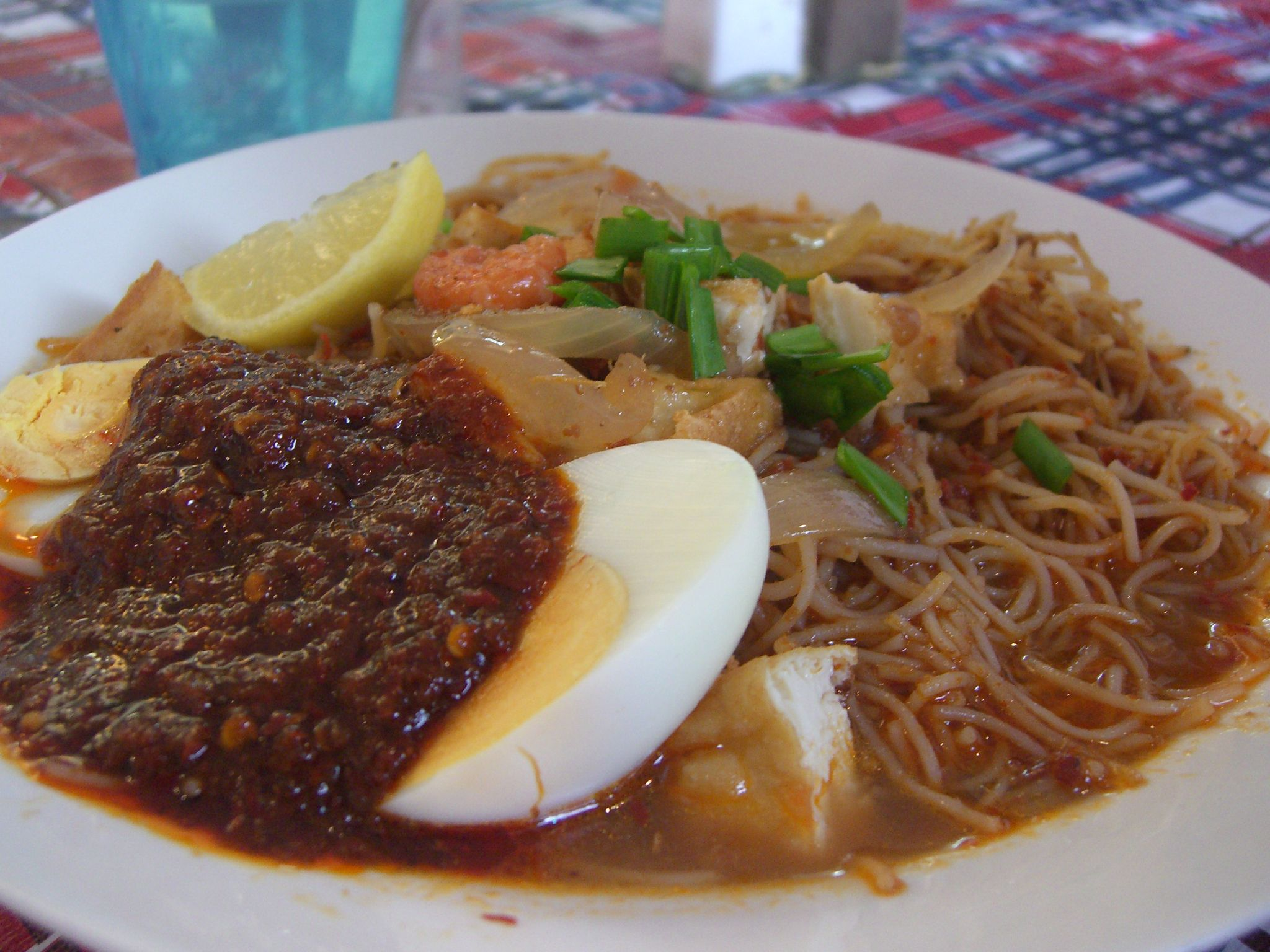
- A plate of mee siam, a Southeast Asian dish that does not contain cockles (hum in Hokkien) to begin with
- Date: 20 August 2006
- Venue: National University of Singapore
- Location: Singapore
- Participants: Lee Hsien Loong

During his speech at the 2006 Singapore National Day rally, Prime Minister Lee Hsien Loong criticised political podcasts. In an apparent reference to a noodle-themed satirical podcast by local blogger mrbrown, Lee used the phrase "mee siam mai hum" (Hokkien for "mee siam without cockles").

Many Internet commentators pointed out that mee siam never contained cockles to begin with; the Prime Minister's Office gave Lee's words as "mee siam mai hiam" (Hokkien for "mee siam without chilli") in its transcript of his speech, before clarifying that he had meant to say "laksa" (a local dish that does contain cockles) instead of "mee siam". Singaporean writer Gwee Li Sui described Lee's phrase as "Singlish for being out of touch".

== Background ==
=== James Gomez ===
On 24 April 2006, Singaporean politician James Gomez officially announced his intention to be part of the Workers' Party's team contesting the Aljunied Group Representation Constituency in the 2006 general election. Since the law required at least one of the candidates contesting in a group representation constituency (GRC) to be a member of a minority community in Singapore, Gomez filled up a "minority candidate form" in front of television cameras at the headquarters of the Elections Department Singapore.

Two days later, however, Gomez was informed by the Elections Department that his form had not been submitted; Gomez warned them that they would face "consequences" for misplacing his papers. The Elections Department subsequently published closed-circuit television (CCTV) footage which showed Gomez placing the papers into his bag instead of submitting them.

The ruling People's Action Party (PAP)—whom the Workers' Party was running against at Aljunied GRC—labelled Gomez a "disgrace" and a "liar". Gomez apologised but framed the episode as a distraction from bread-and-butter issues. On 8 May 2006, shortly after his team's electoral loss to the PAP at Aljunied GRC, Gomez was arrested by the Singapore Police Force on suspicion of "criminal intimidation". He was ultimately released and given a stern warning.

=== Lee Kin Mun ===
Ostensibly inspired by James Gomez's dispute with the Elections Department, Singaporean blogger Lee Kin Mun, better known as mrbrown, produced a satirical radio skit about an articulate patron ordering bak chor mee (minced pork noodles) from a Singlish-speaking hawker. The skit quickly went viral after being uploaded on mrbrown's website and was downloaded thousands of times.

In the skit, the patron requests for his noodles to be served "mai hiam" (Hokkien for "without chilli"), but is upset to find out that the dish contains "tur kua" (Hokkien for "pork liver"). The patron claims that he had requested for his noodles to not have pork liver, but the hawker contradicts him. CCTV footage of the stall proves the hawker correct; the hawker refuses to let the patron go until he has explained why he made his false claim.

== Speech ==
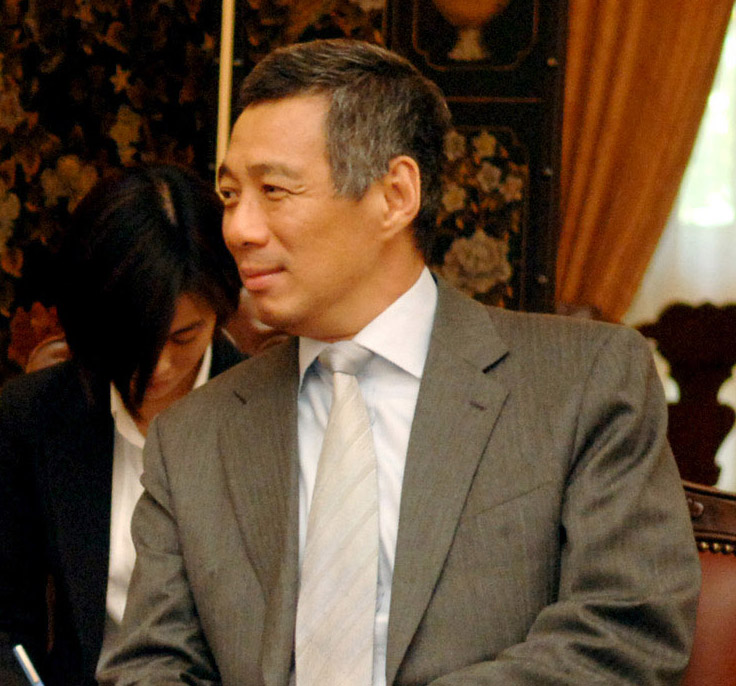
Lee Hsien Loong, photographed in June 2006

On 20 August 2006, Prime Minister of Singapore Lee Hsien Loong delivered his annual National Day rally speech at the National University of Singapore. In the speech, he criticised political podcasts:

It's not just all fun and games. I give you an example. You put out a funny podcast, you talk about bak chor mee. I will say mee siam mai hum. Then we compete. Then what will I do? I will hire Jack Neo to be my National Day Rally adviser. It'll be a fun time, we will enjoy thoroughly, go home totally entertained. But is this the way to deal with serious issues? And the problem is, it won't stop with fun and games. You'll go to distortions, you'll go to half-truths, you'll go to untruths, the tone of the debate will go down, eventually, you race to the bottom.

Although Lee clearly said "mee siam mai hum" (Hokkien for "mee siam without cockles") in the broadcast, the official transcript from the Prime Minister's Office gave his words as "mee siam mai hiam" (Hokkien for "mee siam without chilli").

== Response and legacy ==
On 22 August 2006, two days after Lee's speech, mrbrown uploaded a two-minute-long music clip titled "a harmless podcast", featuring snippets of the Black Eyed Peas' song "My Humps" interspersed with those of Lee's speech containing the words "mai hum".

Many Internet commentators expressed puzzlement at Lee's phrase "mee siam mai hum" since mee siam (a local vermicelli dish) is already served without cockles. Moreover, mee siam is usually sold by Malay hawkers who would not understand the Hokkien phrase "mai hum".

The Prime Minister's Office later clarified that Lee had intended to reference another dish that does contain cockles—laksa—instead of mee siam, but misspoke during his speech.

Singaporean writer Gwee Li Sui wrote that Lee's "blunder" was a "precious contribution to the (Singlish) lexicon" and "happily became Singlish for being out of touch".

On 8 May 2024, to commemorate his final parliamentary session as Prime Minister, Lee was presented with a farewell cake that had numerous fondant decorations, including a bowl of mee siam. According to CNA, this was "a possible reference to the iconic mee siam mai hum meme of 2006."
