= I12 Katong =

i12 Katong
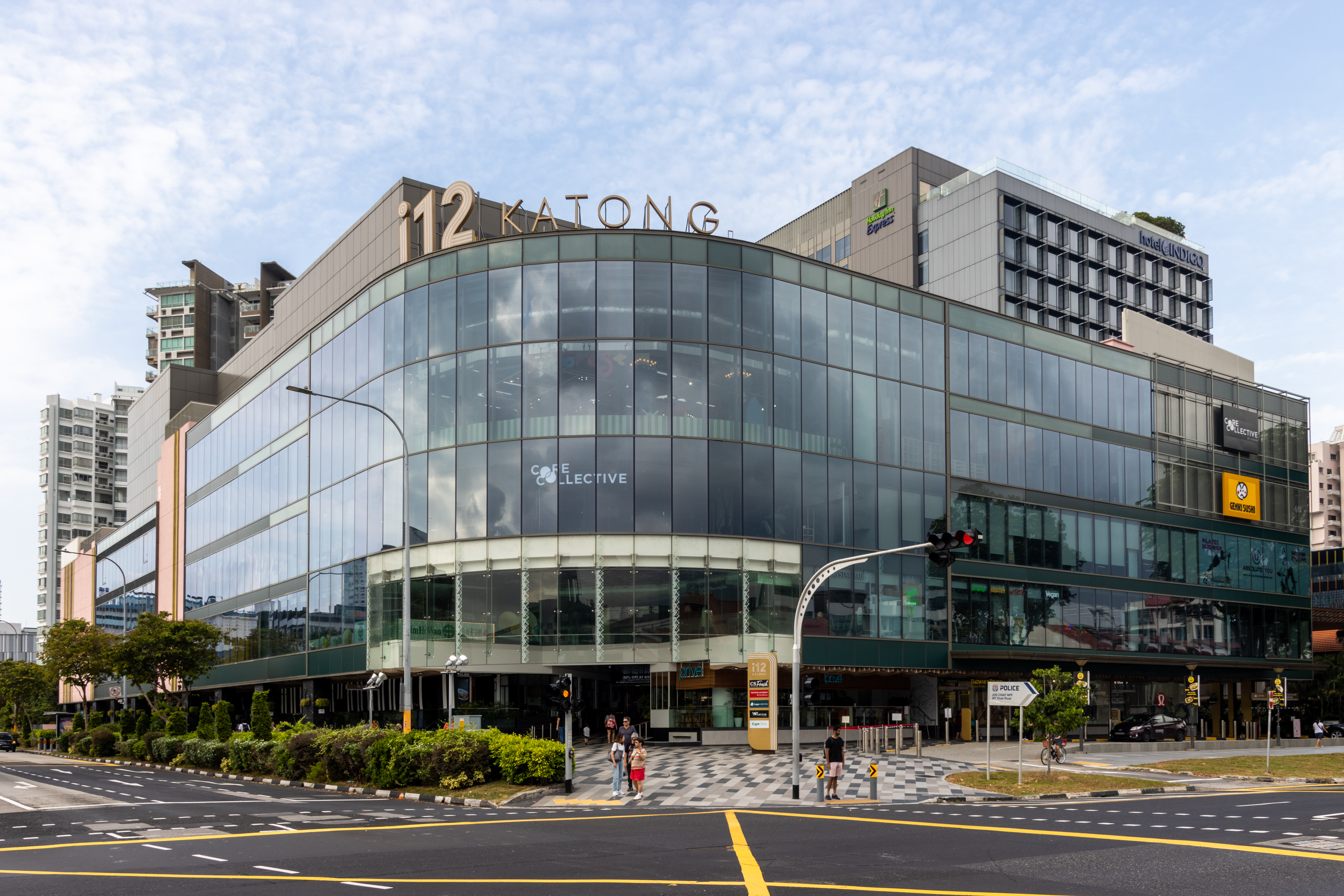
- Facade of i12 Katong.
- Location: Joo Chiat, Singapore
- Coordinates: 1.3050°N 103.9051°E
- Address: 112 East Coast Road
- Opened: 23 December 2021; 4 years ago
- Manager: Keppel Land Retail Management
- Owner: DC Reit Holdings
- Num. of stores: 160 tenants
- Floor area: 211,950 square feet (19,691 m^{2}) (net lettable)
- Floors: 7
- Website: i12katong.com.sg

i12 Katong (formerly Katong Mall and Katong People's Complex) is a seven-storey shopping mall in the east of Singapore. It is located in the heart of Katong at the junction of East Coast Road and Joo Chiat Road. The mall was closed for renovations in March 2020 and had its soft reopening on 23 December 2021, and its grand reopening on 23 June 2022. In April 2026, Keppel agreed to sell the mall to Altallo Holdings for about S$372 million.

== History ==
Completed in late 1983 as Katong People's Complex, it had an exterior facade resembling a prison cell, such as having exposed blue pipes. It was a strata titled mall back then, comprising a department store and various shops and eateries. There are also numerous medical clinics inside the mall.

In 1995, the facade was revamped and the mall was renamed Katong Mall. The department store was replaced by Cold Storage supermarket, and various education centres occupied the upper floors of the mall. The mall's basements contained an electronics store and various strata titled units.

In 2009, because of bad business, Pua Seck Guan, former chief executive of CapitaLand Retail, bought Katong Mall in a $247.55 million deal as part of an en bloc sale. A private trust called Perennial Katong Retail Trust was subsequently formed to buy the mall from Tuan Sing Holdings' Golden Cape Investment. The trust's investors included corporate and institutional investors and Pua.

The mall closed its doors in mid 2010 for a major makeover, to help revitalise the mall. When it reopened as i12 Katong in late 2011, it featured a Peranakan theme, as a reminder of its location. The mall also featured a Golden Village cinema, a Food Republic food court, a gourmet supermarket by Cold Storage, banks, and more than 150 specialty shops. It also featured a wet and dry playground on the fourth floor.

In early 2016, Keppel Land acquired a 22.4% stake in the mall from the owners at $51.4 million. In May 2016, plans were announced to redevelop the play deck on the fourth floor into an alfresco dining area. There are plans for a non-profit organisation to take up space in the mall too.

In December 2018, Keppel Land acquired the remaining 77.6% stake of the mall from the subsidiary of Alpha Asia Macro Trends Fund at the price of $56.6m.

The mall was closed since March 2020 for extensive revitalization works and was reopened on 23 December 2021, in order to "capture the charm and character of Katong". In April 2021, it was announced that the mall is currently 50% tenanted, with returning anchors CS Fresh, Golden Village, United World Preschool, and Wine Connection. New tenants include Climb Asia, Guzman Y Gomez, Kindermusik With Love Studios, Malaysia Boleh, PS Café, Signature KOI, We are Sultans, and Scoop Wholefoods, along with 180 new speciality shops. The atrium will also be relocated to Level 1, and it will have three zones, Fashion Lifestyle, Home and Living and Family Entertainment, which will be shared later this year. The Peranakan theme will be done away as well, coupled with its rebranding to reflect current trends. Typo was opened on 14 August 2022, but again closed down due to poor sales in October 2023.

The mall officially re-opened on 23 June 2022. Some of the new tenants include Bistro Bytes, where customers could pick up their food and beverage orders from fully automated lockers (closed at the end of Dec 2024); and Core Clinic, a medical co-working space with clinic spaces and medical facilities. The mall also has new features including electric vehicle chargers, urban farm areas, and a food digestor to break down food waste from F&B outlets.

On 22 April 2026, Keppel announced that it had entered into a conditional agreement to sell its entire interest in i12 Katong to Altallo Holdings, an entity linked to fund manager Altallo Asset Management, for about S$372 million. The mall had been jointly marketed by Savills and Cushman & Wakefield from around November 2025, at a guide price of S$380 million. Keppel sold its shares in PRE 1 Investments, which holds the mall through Katong Retail Trust; the consideration comprised S$30,000 for the shares and the repayment of a S$372 million loan extended to the trust by another Keppel subsidiary. The sale formed part of Keppel's asset monetisation programme, and completion was expected in the second quarter of 2026. Altallo is owned by Roger Tan and Seah Jun Hao, and its backers were reported to include Andre Tanoto, son of Indonesian businessman Sukanto Tanoto. At the time of the announcement, the mall had a committed occupancy of about 96%; its tenants included CS Fresh, Golden Village, Core Collective and SG Hawker. The sale was announced in the same week that CapitaLand Integrated Commercial Trust agreed to acquire Paragon on Orchard Road for about S$3.9 billion.
