= José d'Almeida =

Portuguese naval surgeon and merchant (1784–1850)

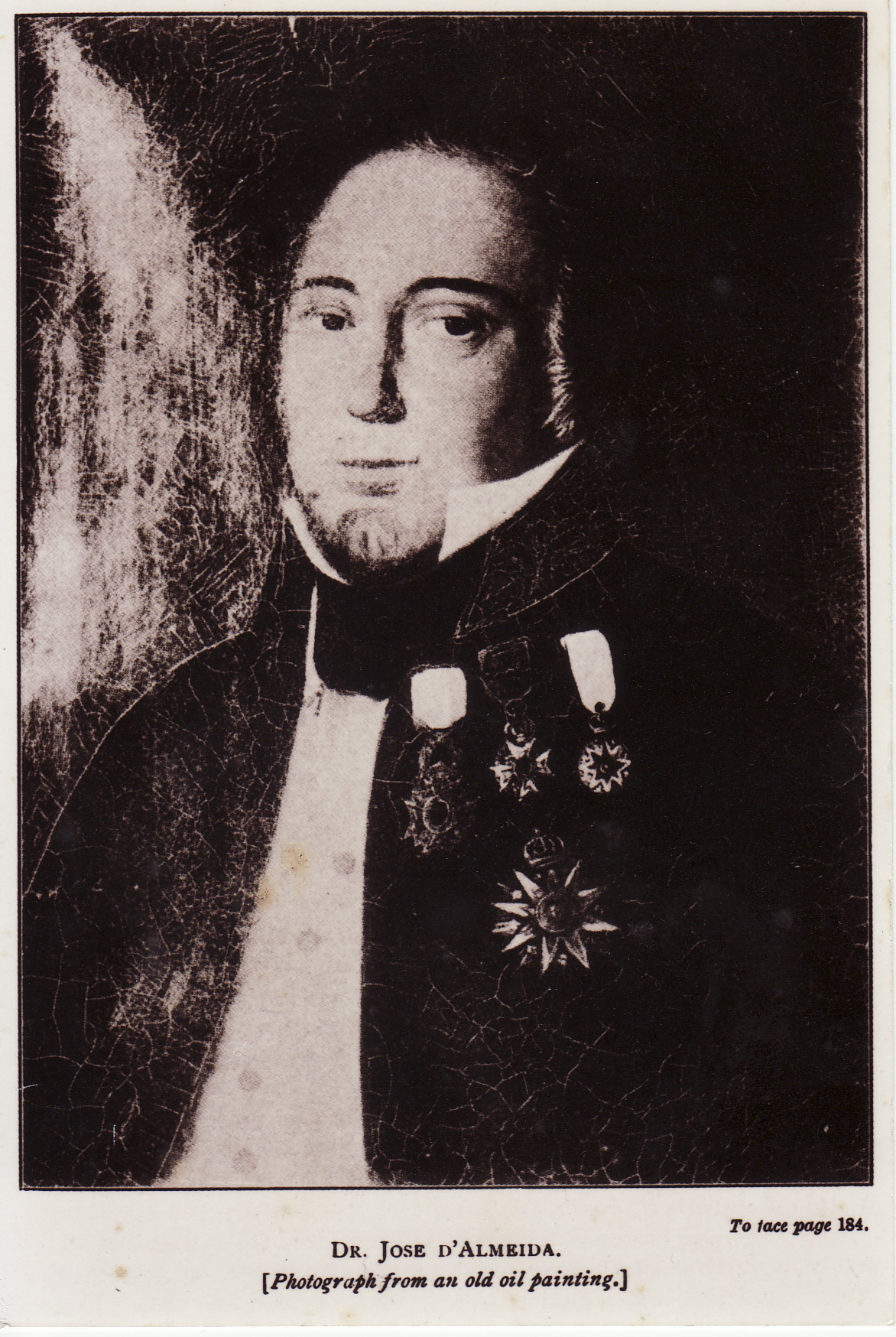
- Born: José d'Almeida Carvalho e Silva; 27 November 1784; São Pedro do Sul, Portugal
- Died: 17 October 1850 (aged 65); Singapore
- Resting place: Fort Canning Hill
- Occupations: Naval surgeon Merchant

José d'Almeida Carvalho e Silva (27 November 1784 — 17 October 1850) was a Portuguese naval surgeon and pioneering merchant in Singapore.

== Early life ==
d'Almeida was born in São Pedro do Sul, Portugal on 27 November 1784, to José d'Almeida and Maria Joaquina de Louroiro. He attended the Coimbra School of Medicine and Surgery, and enlisted in the Portuguese Navy as ship's surgeon after graduating.

== Career ==
In 1808, d'Almeida was appointed the senior surgeon of the Vasco da Gama, a battleship which was stationed in Lisbon. He then travelled to the East and became the director of the Saint Raphael's Hospital in Macau. While passing by in Singapore, he gave Francis James Bernard money to build a house on Beach Road.

When news of the Liberal Revolution of 1820 reached Macau, ties were broken with Goa, India, and a military force was then sent from Goa to retake Macau. Due to this, d'Almeida was arrested in late 1823 and sent to Goa for trial, where he was later imprisoned. He managed to escape to Mumbai along with Father Francisco da Silva Pinto e Maia, who would later establish the Portuguese Mission in Singapore. He arrived in Singapore in 1825, and after a brief stay, returned to Macau to gather his family. He brought them to Singapore by December 1825, and they occupied the house on Beach Road, which was previously occupied by Bernard and his family.

Upon his arrival in Singapore, d'Almeida established a dispensary in Commercial Square. Soon after his arrival, a Portuguese trading ship and a Spanish trading ship carrying various perishables were left stranded in Singapore due to bad weather. He became their agent and was successful in selling their goods. He then established the trading firm Jose d’Almeida & Co. The firm, which was renamed Jose d'Almeida & Son in 1825 following the introduction of his son, Joaquim, to the business, and Jose d'Almeida & Sons in 1827, when Joaquim's brother Jose was introduced to the business, eventually grew to become one of the largest firms within the Straits Settlements.

d'Almeida began growing various strains of cotton, vanilla, cloves, coffee, cochineal, gambage and various trees and fruits in Tanjong Katong, but was largely unsuccessful. He soon found greater success with the growing of coconuts. He became a founding member of the Singapore Agricultural and Horticultural Society in 1836, and, together with the society's vice-president William Montgomerie, is occasionally credited with "discovering" gutta-percha.

He visited Europe in 1842 and was knighted by then Queen of Portugal Maria II of Portugal. He was also appointed the Portuguese Consul General to the Straits Settlements. He later became a member of the Queen's Council in Portugal.

== Personal life and death ==
d'Almeida met and married his first wife, Rosalia d'Almeida, in Macau in 1810. Together, they had 19 or 20 children, including Joaquim d'Almeida, who continued d'Almeida's trade in Singapore and took over his role as Portuguese Consul General to the Straits Settlements.

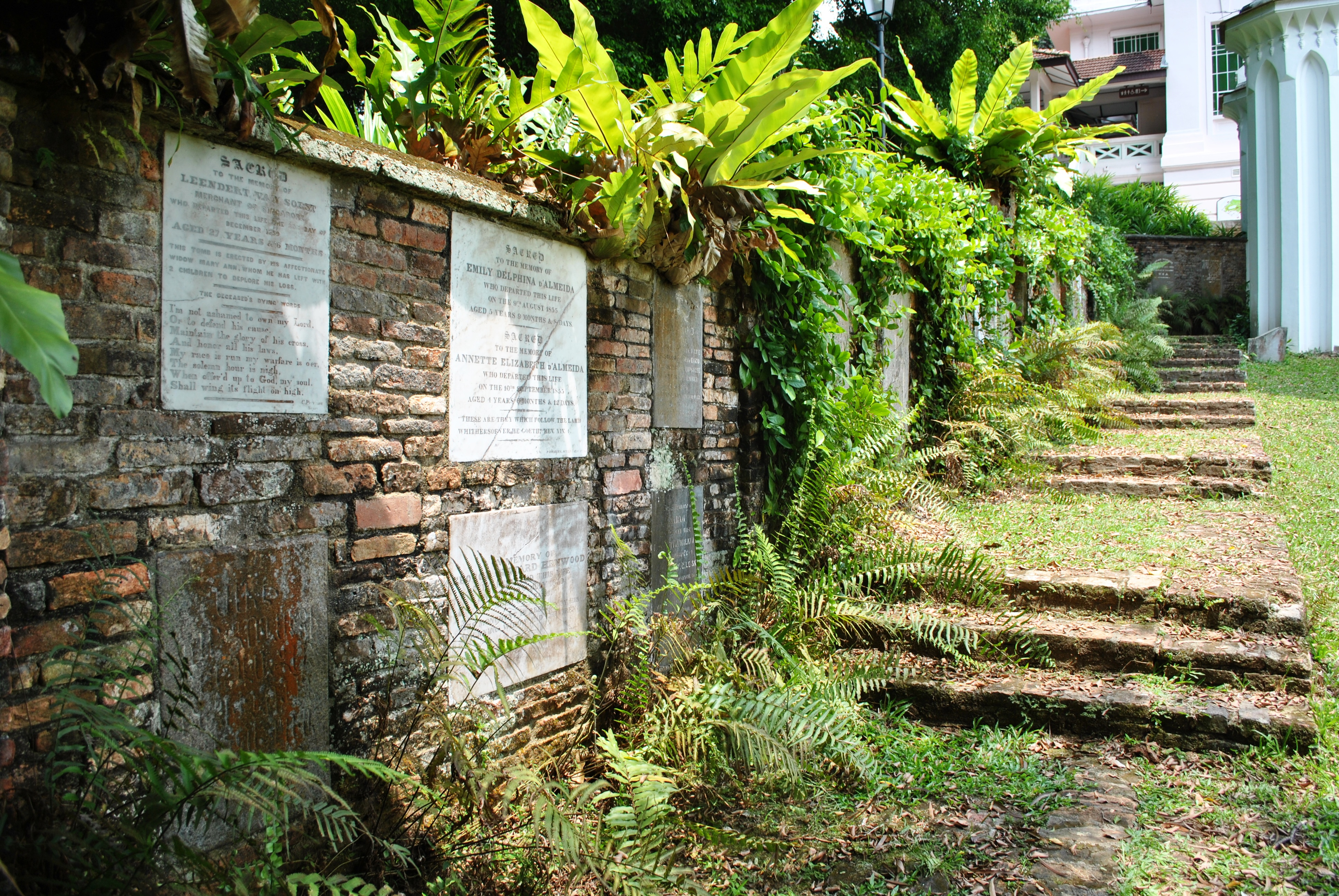
José d'Almeida's tomb at Fort Canning Old Cemetery.

He frequently threw large parties in his residence on Beach Road. He and his family were also musicians, and they performed with other musicians as an orchestra at his parties. When Francisco da Silva Pinto e Maia arrived in Singapore, there was no Catholic church on the island. Due to this, he instead celebrated holy mass at d'Almeida's residence.

d'Almeida died on 17 October 1850, and was buried in Fort Canning Hill.
