= 25 Chapel Road =

Historical Building in Singapore

Coordinates: 1°18′21″N 103°54′30″E

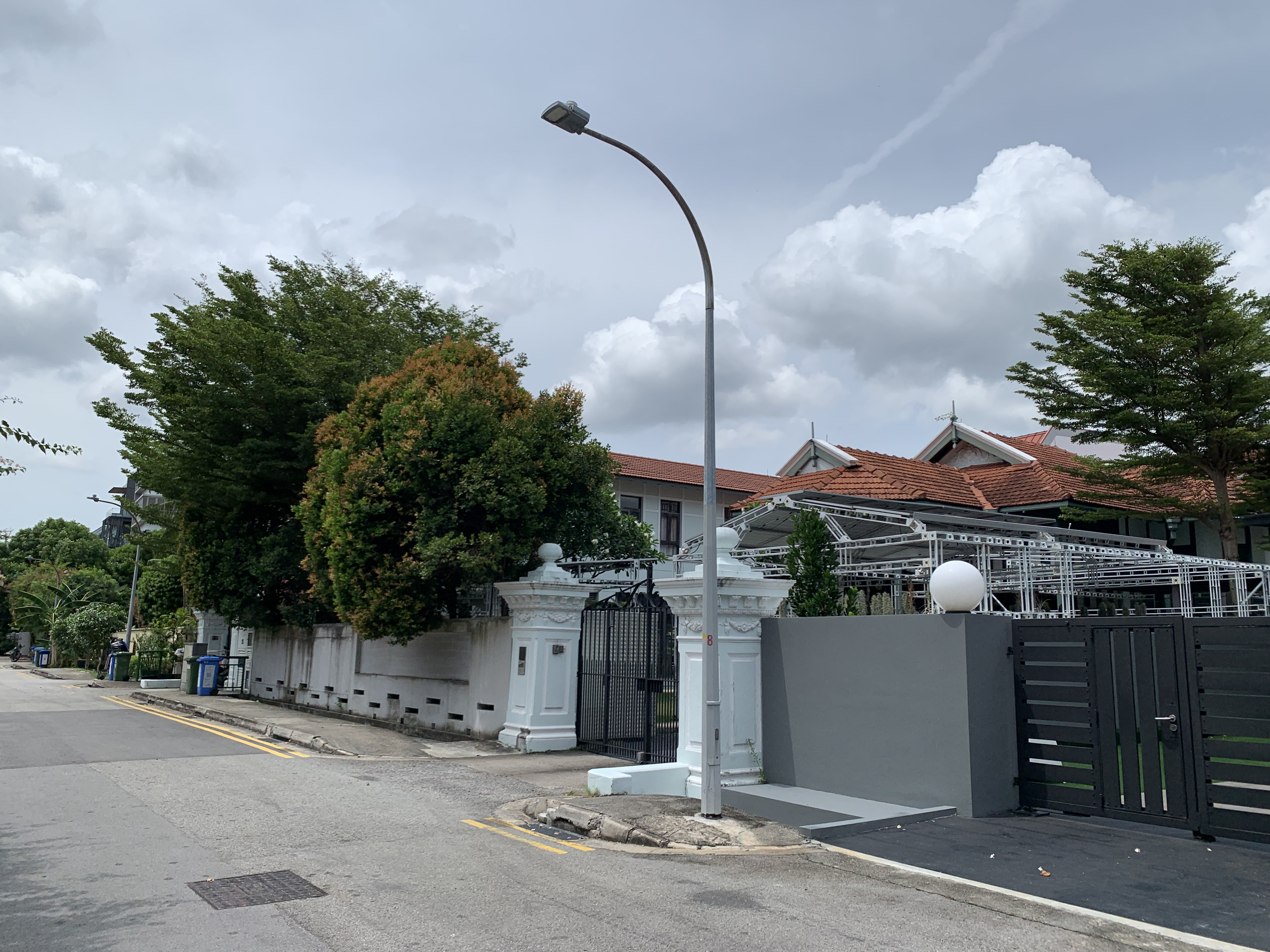
25 Chapel Road in 2025

25 Chapel Road is a bungalow on Chapel Road in Katong, Singapore. Completed in the 1900s, the building later received a "crudely attached" extension as the number of occupants increased. Following the bungalow's conservation, the extension was removed as part of the bungalow's restoration and a new wing was added.

== Description ==
The single-storey Art Deco Anglo-Malay style bungalow is elevated above the ground with the support of brick piers, which protect the building from floods. Floral mouldings can be found on the exterior, while Peranakan glazed pattern tile risers can be found on the two staircases leading up to the bungalow, which also feature decorative mouldings and balusters. The bungalow features the standard Malay house plan, with a verandah, known as a serambi, in the front, followed by a central core section, known as a rumah ibu, with a kitchen, known as a dapur, at the back.

The building features a verandah, which is open-air and "polygonal" in shape, with an "unusual patterned, coloured cork flooring". The interior of the bungalow features timber flooring, as well as "intricate ironmongery locksets" on the windows and doors. It also features patterned doors, which are accompanied by lattice windows.

== History ==
The bungalow was completed in the early 1900s. It initially had two bedrooms. In 1932, the property was purchased by Tan Swee Hee, a money broker, for $12,000. One bedroom was used by Tan and his wife, while the other was used by their daughter, Alice, as well as Alice's husband, broker George Lee. George and Alice later built an extension to the house to allow for an additional bedroom, which they occupied. The building underwent a $1.7 million renovation in 2008.

In 2009, the building was gazetted for conservation by the Urban Redevelopment Authority, who were successful in convincing its then-owners, who were Alice and George's daughters, to voluntarily put it up for conservation. It then underwent restoration, which involved removing the ground-level extension as it "detracted from the spirit of the house". Carved timber window screens and a pintu pagar (half length timber door) were installed to allow for privacy. A new wing, featuring five bedrooms, all of which were accompanied by bathrooms, a covered patio and a lap pool. In the following year, the restoration project received the Category A award at the Urban Redevelopment Authority Architectural Heritage Awards. In November 2020, the owners of the building announced that it was to be put up for sale for $19 million.
