= Joo Chiat Road =

Road in Singapore

- Chinese: 如切 (pinyin: Rúqiè, Singaporean Hokkien Pe̍h-ōe-jī: Jû-chhiat), Malay language: Joo Chiat, Tamil language: ஜூ சியாட் (Jū ciyāṭ, transliteration using ISO 15919)
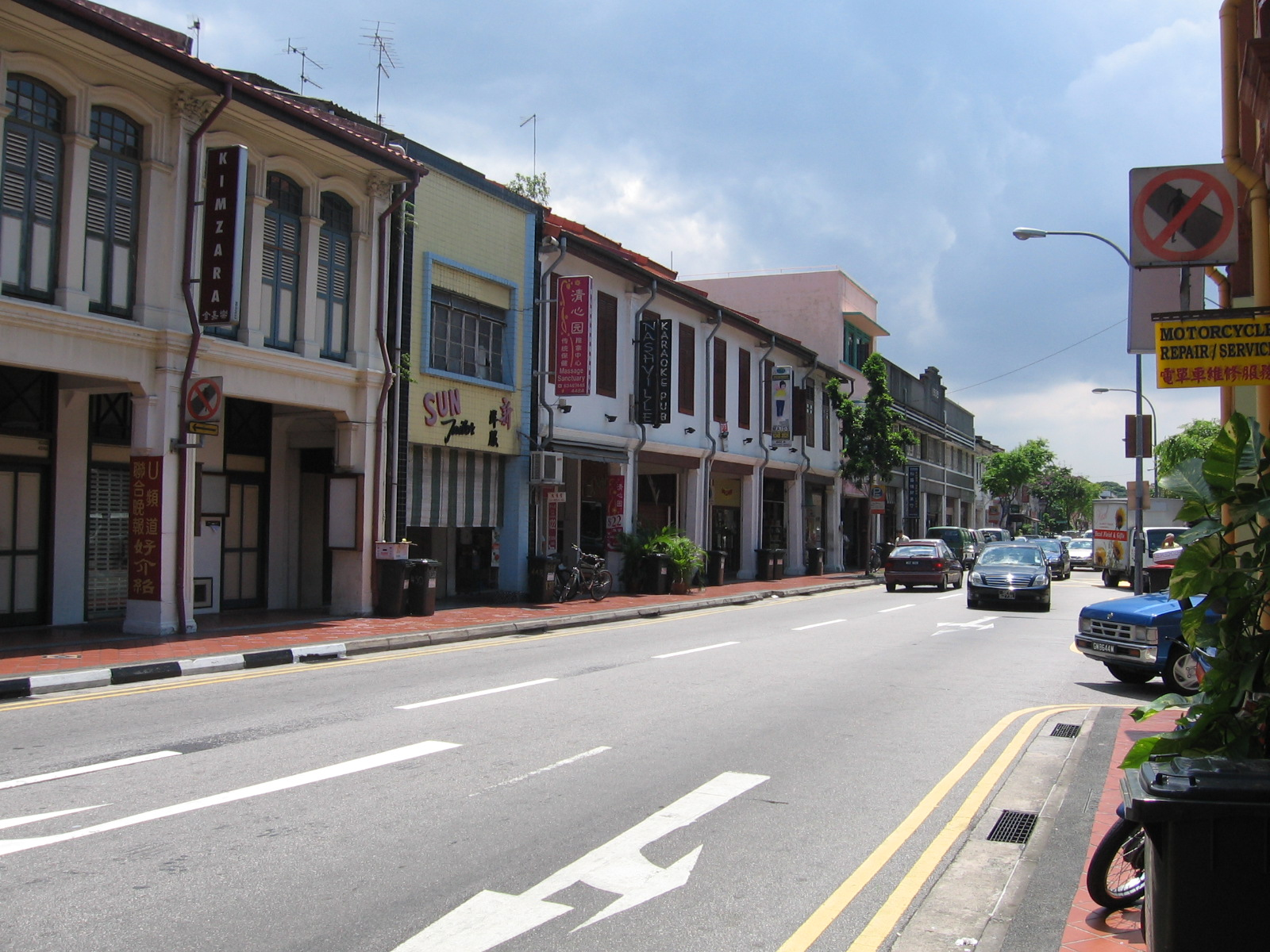
- Joo Chiat Road
- Interactive map of Joo Chiat Road
- Former name: Confederate Estate Road
- Namesake: Chew Joo Chiat (businessman)
- Owner: Land Transport Authority (LTA)
- Maintained by: LTA
- Nearest Mass Rapid Transit System station: Marine Parade MRT station, Paya Lebar MRT station
- Coordinates: 1.309°N 103.902°E

Other
- Known for: Peranakan shophouses

Joo Chiat Road (IPA: /ˌdʒuː ˈtʃjɛt/ JOO-CHYET) is a road in the Katong. The surrounding residential area is a conservation area. The road intersects East Coast Road and terminates at its junction with Marine Parade Road, beside Marine Parade MRT station.

The area has received several architectural and heritage awards, including a UNESCO Asia-Pacific Award for Cultural Heritage Conservation for 125 Joo Chiat Road. It has numerous amenities and a diverse range of eateries, including several Michelin-recommended restaurants.

== Etymology and history ==
In the 1820s, the area now known as Joo Chiat consisted of coconut and cotton plantations, including Confederate Estate, The Grove and Perseverance Estate. Notable plantation owners included Francis James Bernard, José d'Almeida, Thomas Dunman and Hoo Ah Kay. Confederate Estate Road ran alongside Confederate Estate.

As the area developed during the early 20th century, Chew Joo Chiat (Chinese: 周如切; pinyin: Zhōu Rúqiè; Pe̍h-ōe-jī: Chiu Jû-chhiat), a Chinese businessman of Peranakan descent, bought much of the land in the Katong and Joo Chiat area, including Confederate Estate and Confederate Estate Road. Chew bought land from the Alsagoff family and the Little family to cultivate spices such as nutmeg, gambier and pepper, which were in demand among Europeans. His acquisitions earned him the nickname "King of Katong". In 1913, Chew bought five freehold building allotments fronting Confederate Estate Road at auction, further increasing his landholdings.

In early 1917, local produce was transported by bullock cart, and Confederate Estate Road was a cart track through Chew's plantation. As a private road, it was maintained by Chew. At the time, Katong remained under the jurisdiction of the Rural Board.

The municipal boundary was then extended to include Confederate Estate Road, as the municipality intended to construct a road for motor vehicles from Geylang Serai to the beach. The municipality offered to buy part of Chew's land, including Confederate Estate Road, for the project. Chew instead donated the road to the municipality. In recognition of the donation, it was renamed Joo Chiat Road.

As more people moved into the area around Joo Chiat Road, demand for housing increased. Chew divided his land into building lots, which he sold to developers who built houses, including Peranakan shophouses. The subsequent construction of some of Singapore's earliest season houses and holiday bungalows contributed to the area's development as an affluent, upper-middle-class suburb.

In 1957, Katong Presbyterian Church was built on Joo Chiat Terrace, off Joo Chiat Road. In 1971, it moved to Joo Chiat Lane.

The development of Geylang Serai in the 1960s also prompted the government to build mosques and theatres in Joo Chiat, as well as other community amenities, including a police station, schools and a health centre.

Joo Chiat Market, at the northern end of Joo Chiat Road, was an important trading centre for Malays from Malaysia, Brunei and Indonesia, who traded food, flowers and spices.

=== 1967–1975 ===
As Singapore's population grew and people moved out of the city centre, Joo Chiat's population increased. Four additional schools and a community centre were built. Joo Chiat remained an entertainment hub, with the Galaxy theatre and two new shopping centres.

=== 1976–1984 ===
Land reclamation along the East Coast began in 1966 and continued until 1985. It altered the area's physical landscape by modifying the coastline and removing Katong Jetty. Together with the construction of new high-rise housing estates in East Coast, the reclamation contributed to Joo Chiat's gradual loss of its distinct identity through a process of deterritorialisation.

The late 1970s and early 1980s also saw further road changes, with adjoining streets connected to improve access. The Taj Cinema, adjacent to the markets, was renamed the Singapura Theatre by Shaw. It later declined in popularity and closed in 1985.

In 1981, planning approval was granted for Joo Chiat Complex, which was to be built on the site of the former market. The five-storey complex cost $37 million to build and contained 138 shops and 24 offices.

=== 1985–1995 ===
As the kampongs in Geylang made way for Housing and Development Board (HDB) flats, a museum showcasing Malay life was proposed in the 1970s. The museum, Geylang Serai Malay Village, was completed in 1989 and located at the beginning of Joo Chiat Road.

=== 1995–present ===
In 2011, Joo Chiat was designated Singapore's first Heritage Town, partly in recognition of efforts to promote its Peranakan culture.

In 2014, Lucky Shophouse, formerly Lucky Bookstore, at 125 Joo Chiat Road received a Jury Commendation for Innovation at the UNESCO Asia-Pacific Awards for Cultural Heritage Conservation.

== Food ==
Joo Chiat has a variety of eateries, including the Red House Bakery and Chin Mee Chin Confectionery. Since 2014, the area's dining scene has diversified, with Western-style cafés and restaurants opening along Joo Chiat Road. Although traditionally associated with Peranakan cuisine, the area now has restaurants serving cuisines from various regions.

== See also ==
- Katong
