= Dona Manis =

Bakery in Marine Parade, Singapore

- Interactive map of Dona Manis

Restaurant information
- Established: 1992; 34 years ago
- Owner: Esther Tan
- Previous owners: Tan Tieow Teong; Soh Tho Lang
- Food type: Baked goods
- Location: 865 Mountbatten Road, #B1-93, Katong Shopping Centre, Singapore 437844
- Coordinates: 1.3037°N 103.9012°E

Dona Manis is a bakery at Katong Shopping Centre in Marine Parade, Singapore. Established in 1992 by Tan Tieow Teong and Soh Tho Lang, the shop is widely known for its banana pies. Following Tan's death in April 2024, Soh—who had been Dona Manis' chief baker—left the business to establish her own bakery next door; Tan's daughter, Esther, became the sole owner of Dona Manis.
