= Mee siam =

Southeast Asian noodle dish

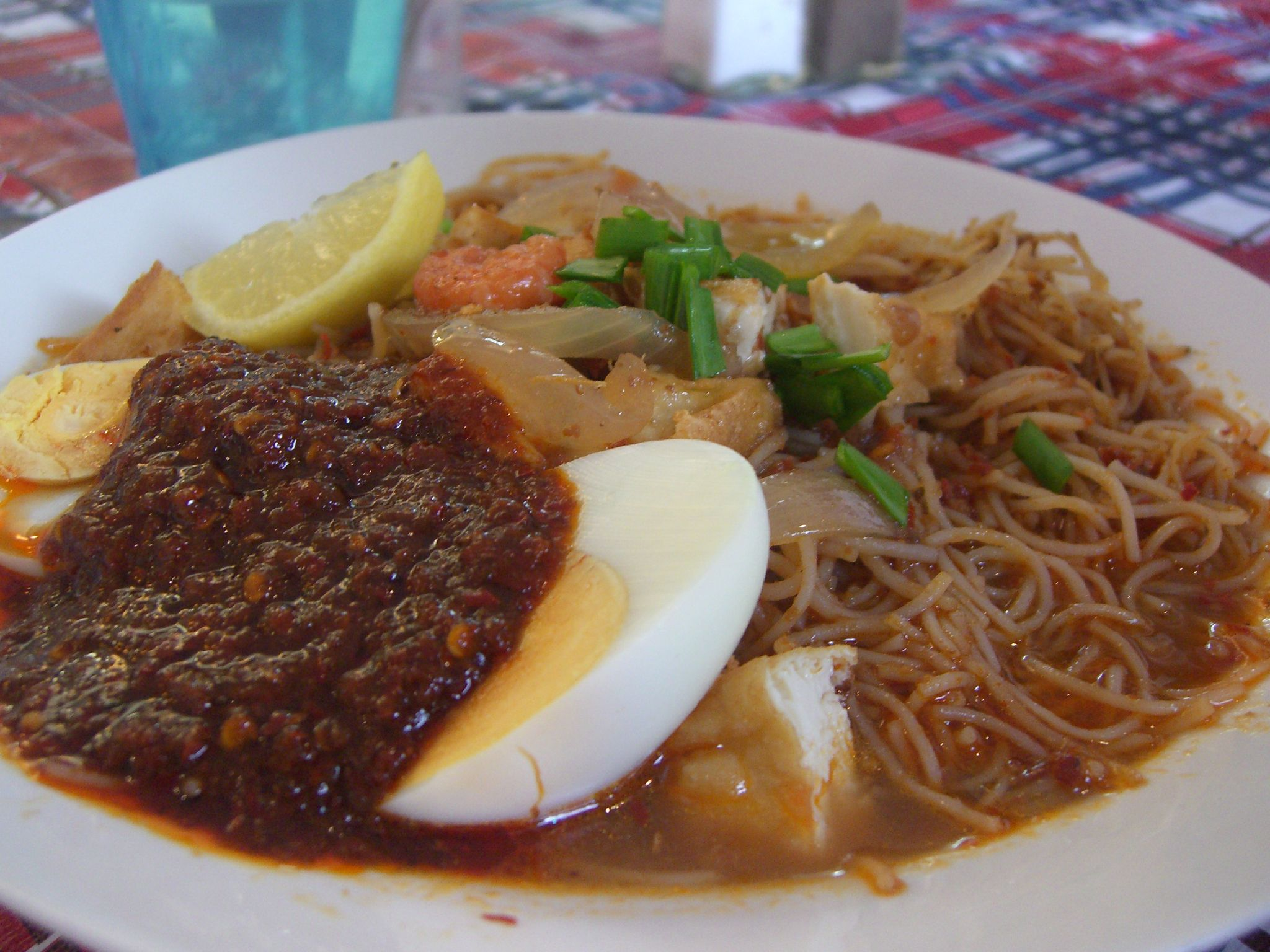
- A plate of mee siam with egg and sambal
- Type: Noodle
- Course: Breakfast, lunch and dinner
- Place of origin: Penang, Malaysia
- Region or state: Southeast Asia
- Associated cuisine: Malaysian, Singaporean
- Main ingredients: Rice noodles (vermicelli), light gravy

Mee siam (lit. 'Siamese noodles') is a dish of thin rice vermicelli of hot, sweet and sour flavours, originating in Penang but popular among the Malay and Peranakan communities throughout Peninsular Malaysia and Singapore, although the dish is called "Siamese noodle" in Malay and thus appears to be inspired by or adapted from Thai flavours when Thailand was formerly known as Siam. Mee siam is related to kerabu bee hoon although there is a significant difference between the recipes.

== History ==
According to Wendy Hutton, due to the Thai influence on Northern Malaysian cuisine, it is believed that the dish originates from Penang, where Thai influences on Malay and Peranakan dishes are common. Dishes from Penang possess Thai influences, such as more liberal use of tamarind and other sour ingredients including dishes like mee siam and asam laksa.

As Singapore was established in the early 1800s, many straits Chinese families from Penang moved to Singapore, thus introducing the dish to Singapore.

== Variants ==
There are many known variants of Mee Siam in Malaysia such as the dry-fried version in Johor, the wet version in Malacca, as well as other places like Kuala Lumpur, Mersing, Kedah and Perlis. The "dry" version is more commonly found, which is essentially stir frying the rice noodles with the same ingredients used in the wet version. Mee siam is a common dish breakfast, brunch or lunch dish in Malaysia. It is usually served along any of the following sides: fried chicken, fried or boiled egg, sambal, otak-otak (grilled fish cake made of groundfish meat mixed with tapioca starch and spices), and luncheon meat.

In Singapore, it is served with spicy, sweet and sour light gravy. The gravy is made from a rempah spice paste, tamarind and taucheo (salted soybean). Mee Siam is typically garnished with a hard boiled egg, scallions, bean sprouts, garlic chives, and lime wedges. A "dry" version is sometimes more commonly found, which is essentially stir frying the rice noodles with the same ingredients.

== Similar dishes ==
In Thailand, a very similar dish is known as Mi Kathi (noodles with coconut milk), a noodle dish that is popularly eaten as lunch in the Central Region. It is made by stir-frying rice vermicelli noodles with a fragrant and thick sauce that has a similar taste profile as Mee Siam.

The sauce is made from coconut milk mixed with minced pork, prawns, firm bean curd, salted soybean, bean sprouts, garlic chives, and tamarind. It is served with thinly sliced egg omelette, fresh bean sprouts, fresh garlic and banana blossom.

A similar noodle dish in Laos is known as mee ka tee.

Yet another similar dish found in the Philippines is known as pancit palabok, and features a much saltier gravy made with annatto seeds and additional shrimp.

== See also ==
- Malay cuisine
- Peranakan cuisine
- Mee siam mai hum, a phrase by the Prime Minister of Singapore Lee Hsien Loong
