= Joaquim d'Almeida =

Freed African slave and slaver from Brazil (d. 1857)

Joaquim d'Almeida (died 1857), also called Zoki Azata, was a freed African slave of the Mahi people (Dahomey) in Brazil who became a trader in African slaves.

== Sources ==
- Kostiw, Nicolette M. (2016). "d'Almeida, Joaquim". In Knight, Franklin W.; Gates, Henry Louis Jr. (eds.). Dictionary of Caribbean and Afro–Latin American Biography. Oxford University Press. doi:10.1093/acref/9780199935796.001.0001. ISBN 978-0-19-993579-6.
- Almeida, James; Niven, Steven J., eds. "Joaquim d'Almeida". Enslaved: Peoples of the Historical Slave Trade. Retrieved 24 March 2023.
