= Katong Shopping Centre =

Shopping mall located along Mountbatten Road in Singapore

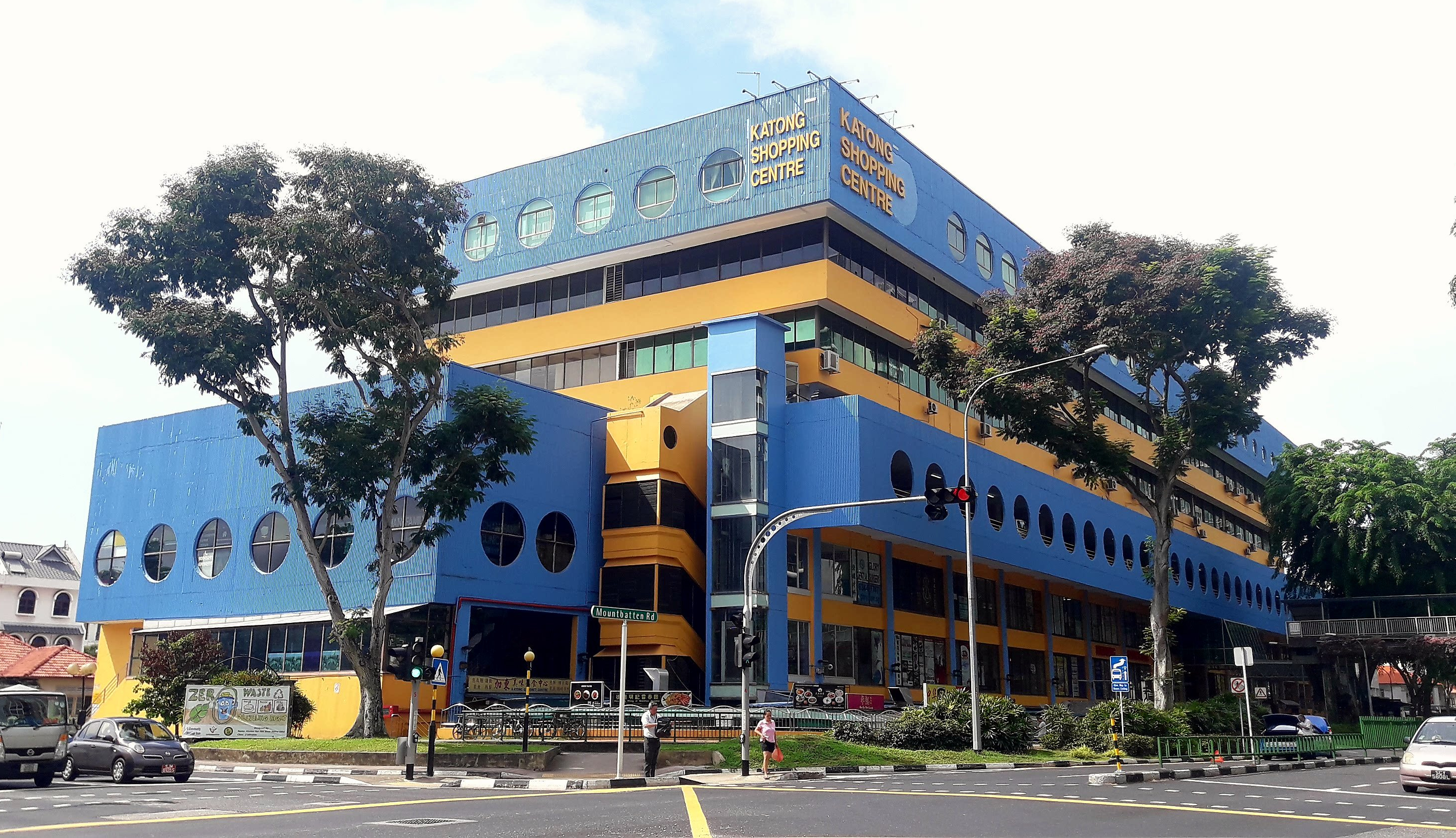
- Katong Shopping Centre in 2019
- Location: Katong, Singapore
- Coordinates: 1.3039°N 103.8989°E
- Address: 865 Mountbatten Road, Singapore 437844
- Opened: 1973; 53 years ago
- Manager: Savills Property Management
- Num. of stores: More than 300
- Num. of anchor tenants: 3
- Floor area: 90,000 square feet (8,400 m^{2})
- Floors: 7
- Website: katongshoppingcentre.com

Katong Shopping Centre (Chinese: 加东购物中心) is a shopping centre located along Mountbatten Road in Singapore. Established in 1971 and opened to the public in 1973, it was the first air-conditioned mall in Singapore. Katong Shopping Centre is situated around Odeon Theater, Katong V, Roxy Square, as well as several hotels, such as Village Hotel Katong and the Grand Mercure Roxy Hotel. The aging mall was once home to a bowling center on the 7th floor and mostly textile, shoe and food outlets, and now houses many services which include tailoring, photocopying/printing and several employment agencies.

== History ==
In mid January 2010, 80% of the 410 owners gave their approval to the en bloc sale. Owners were expected to receive a reserve price of at least $2000 per sq ft.

In August 2011, the mall embarked on its first attempt at an en bloc sale, slated to be completed in mid-2012. But the $445 million deal fell through. Back then, the apportioned value to each owner was an average of $2,000 to $2,800 per square foot.

As of June 2014, there was a second attempt to have an en bloc sale.

In June 2016, there was another attempt at an en bloc sale at a total of $630 million.

== Notable shops ==
- Dona Manis, bakery

== Gallery ==
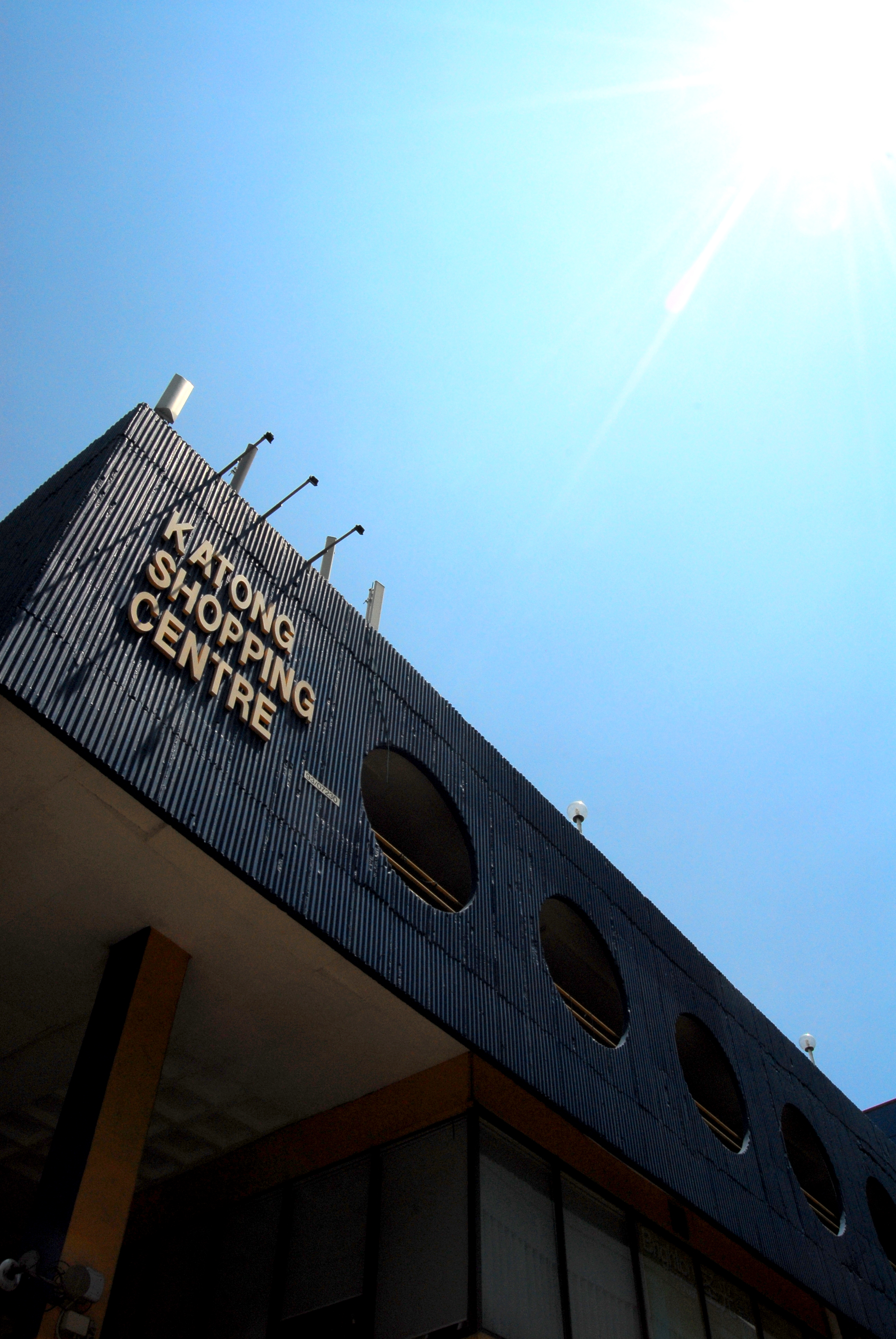
Facade of Katong Shopping Centre facing The Odeon Katong

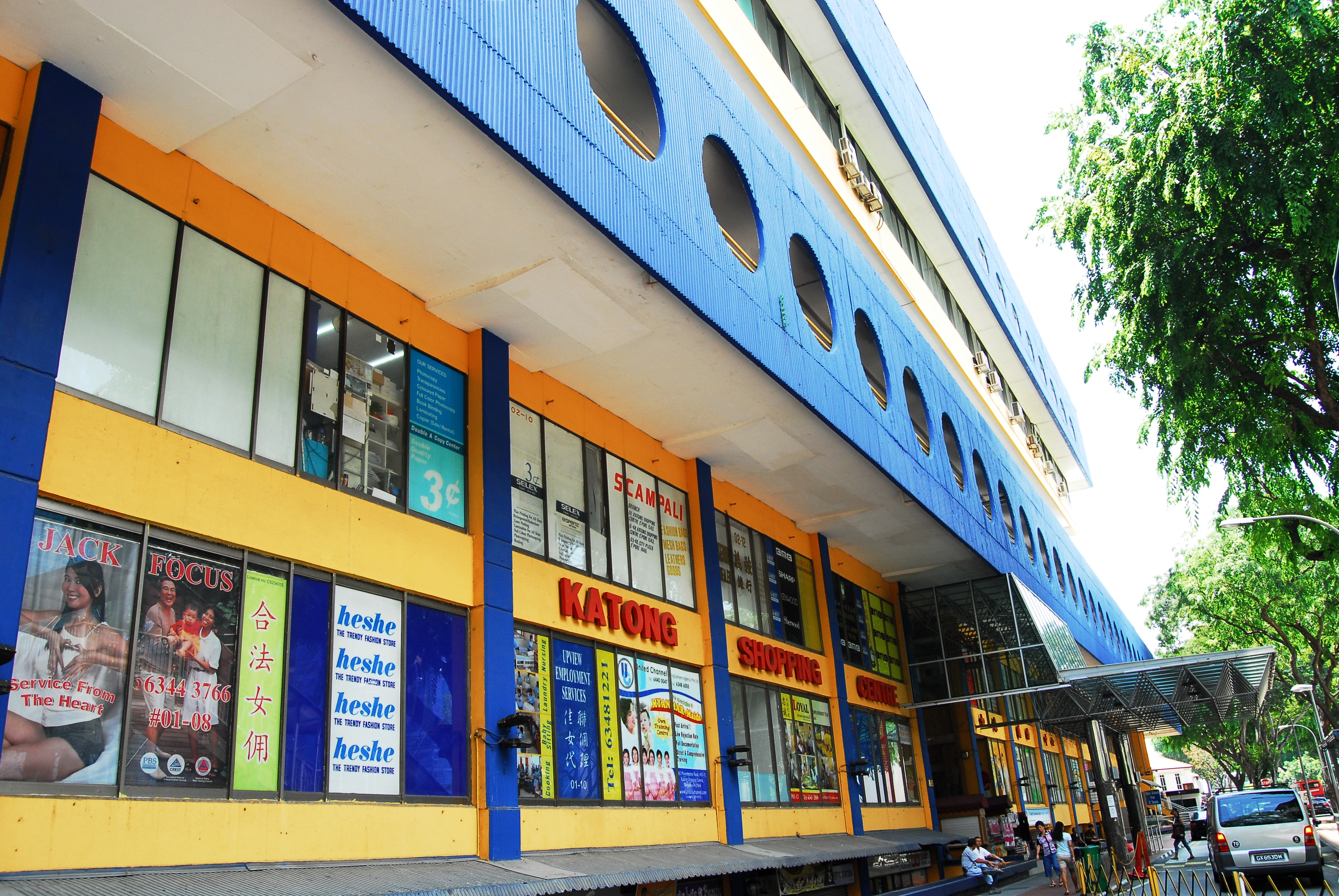
Facade of Katong Shopping Centre

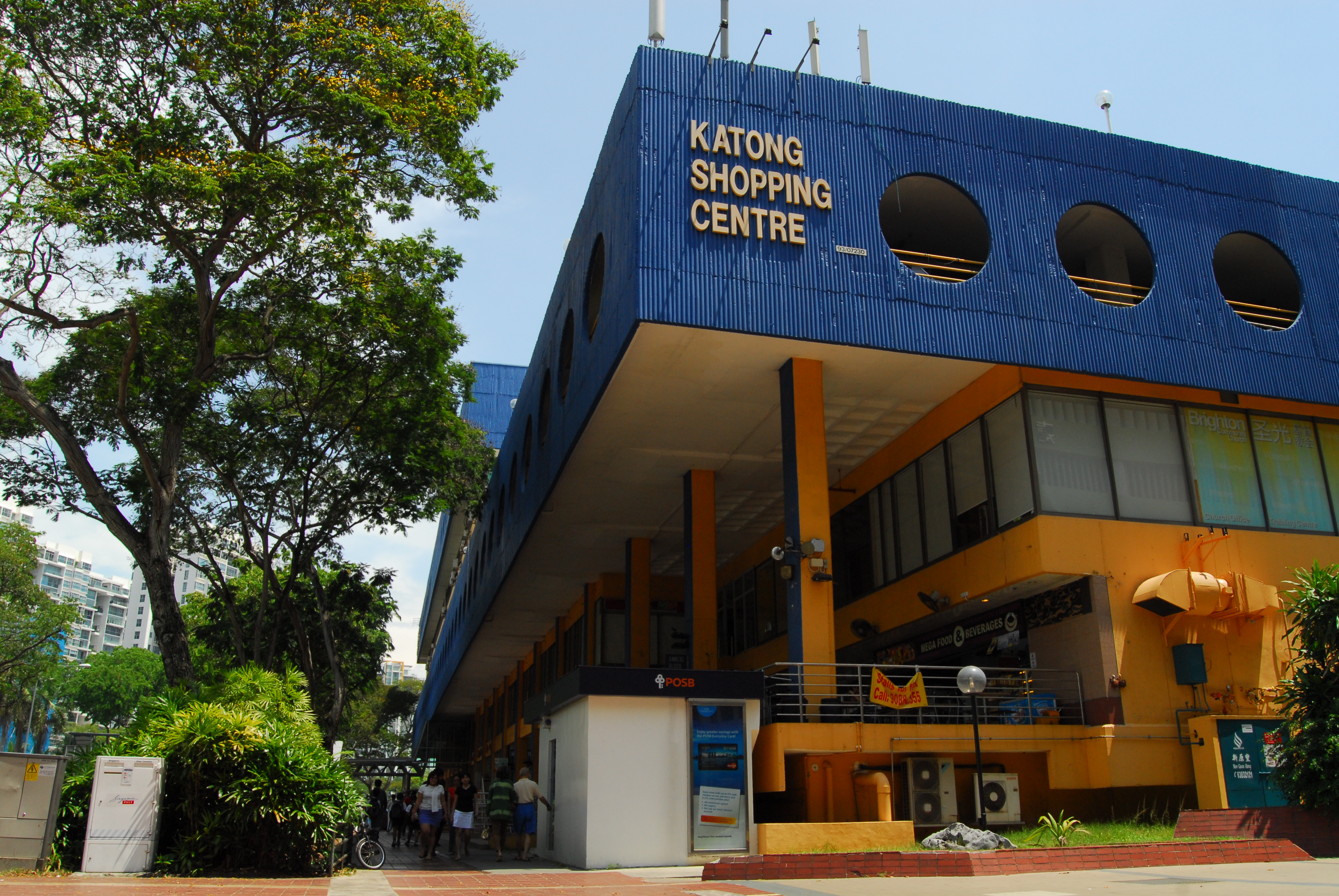
Katong Shopping Centre in 2011
