= Katong =

Neighbourhood in Central Region, Singapore

- Subzone of Marine Parade Planning Area

Other transcription(s)
  - Malay: Tanjung Katong (Rumi) تنجوڠ کاتوڠ (Jawi)
  - Chinese: 加东 (Simplified) 加東 (Traditional); Jiādōng (Pinyin); Ka-tong (Hokkien POJ)
  - Tamil: காத்தோங் Kāttōṅ (Transliteration)
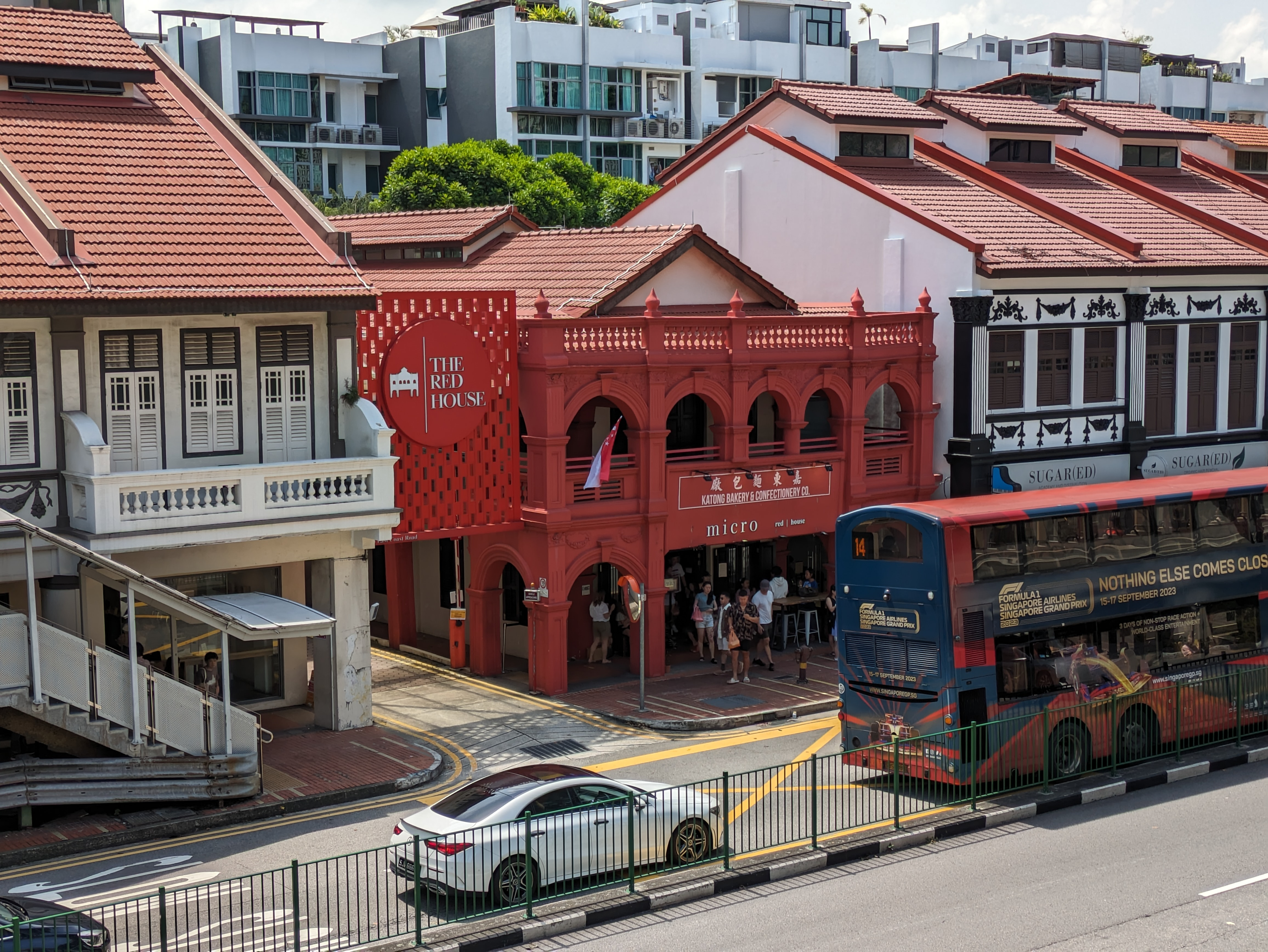
- Shophouses in Katong
- Interactive map of Katong
- Country: Singapore
- Planning area: Marine Parade
- Subzone: Katong
- Website: www.katong.sg

Katong (Note: IPA: /ˈkɑːtɒŋ/ KAH-tong, Chinese: 丹戎加东, Pinyin: Dānróngjiādōng, Tamil: தஞ்சோங் காத்தோங், Arabic: تانجونج كاتونج, Persian: تانجونگ کاتونگ, Kurdish: تانجۆنگ کاتۆنگ) (commonly referred to as Tanjong Katong) is a residential neighbourhood in the eastern portion of the Central Region of Singapore, within the Marine Parade planning area. The Katong district stretches from Fort Road area to the Joo Chiat area. It used to be located by the sea, before land reclamation towards the south to East Coast Park was created for housing and recreational purposes beginning in the 1960s to 1970s.

Katong was the location of many villas and mansions of the wealthy elite in the late 19th to the mid-20th centuries. They made their fortunes in the Far East and built seaside resorts, villas and manors along the beachfront of Katong, beginning from Katong Park to the end of the East Coast.

Katong's rich cultural mix has contributed to its unique cuisine. Katong is well known among locals as a food district with a variety of shophouse restaurants serving Peranakan cuisine and particularly, a spicy Singaporean noodle soup known as Katong laksa. Its famous icons include Joo Chiat Road's "food street", Dunman food center, Koon Seng Road & Everitt Road's Peranakan conservation house, Eurasian Heritage Gallery.

== Etymology ==
Tanjong Katong derived from the popular beach shoreline along the East Coast. In Malay, Tanjong means cape whilst Katong refers to a now extinct species of turtles as well as "the effect of a sea mirage" when looking at the shoreline. This coastal feature was located near the present Tanjong Katong Flyover across East Coast Parkway and has since disappeared due to land reclamation.

== History ==
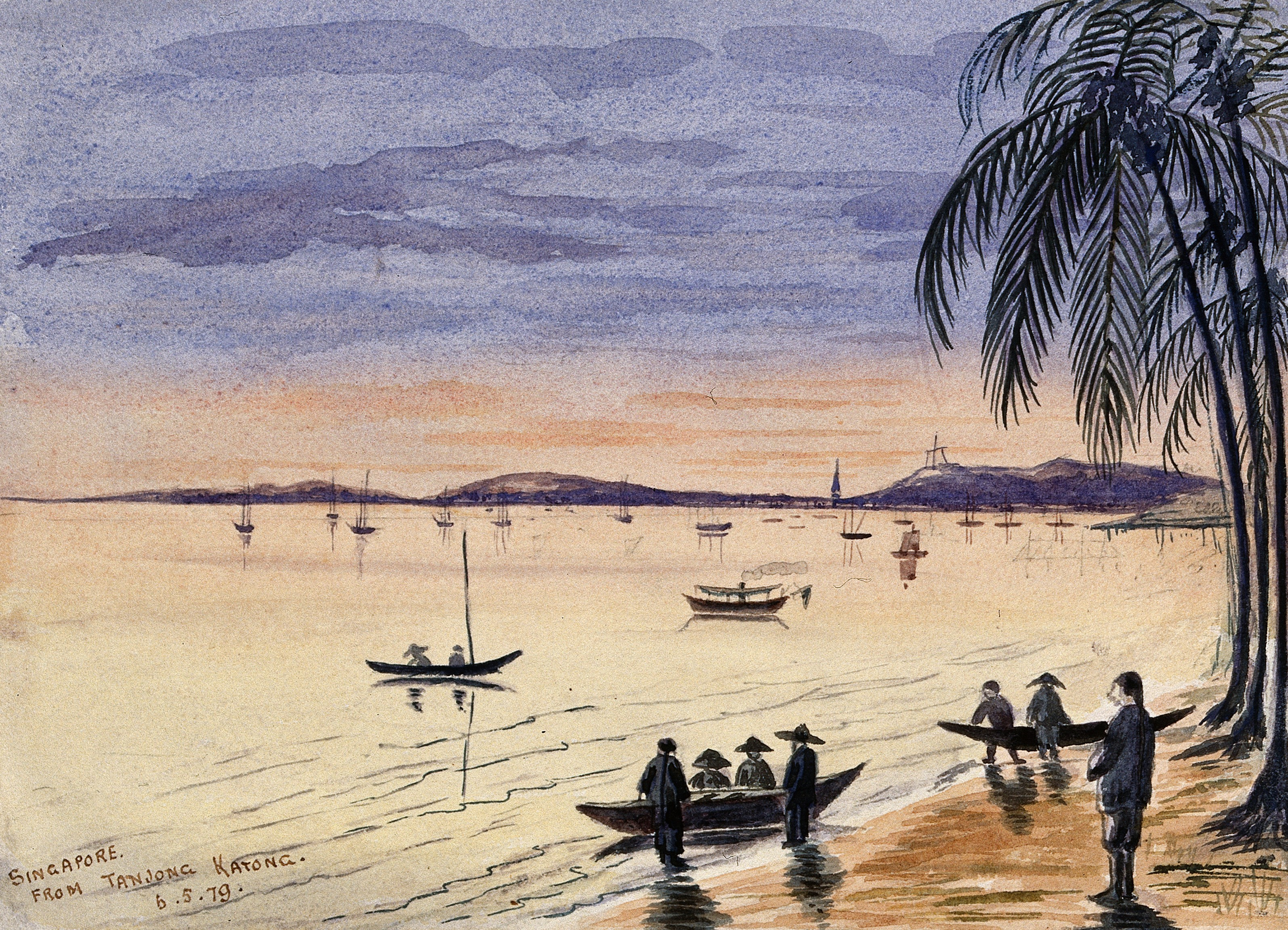
A watercolour painting of Katong facing the sea during the 1870s by John Edmund Taylor

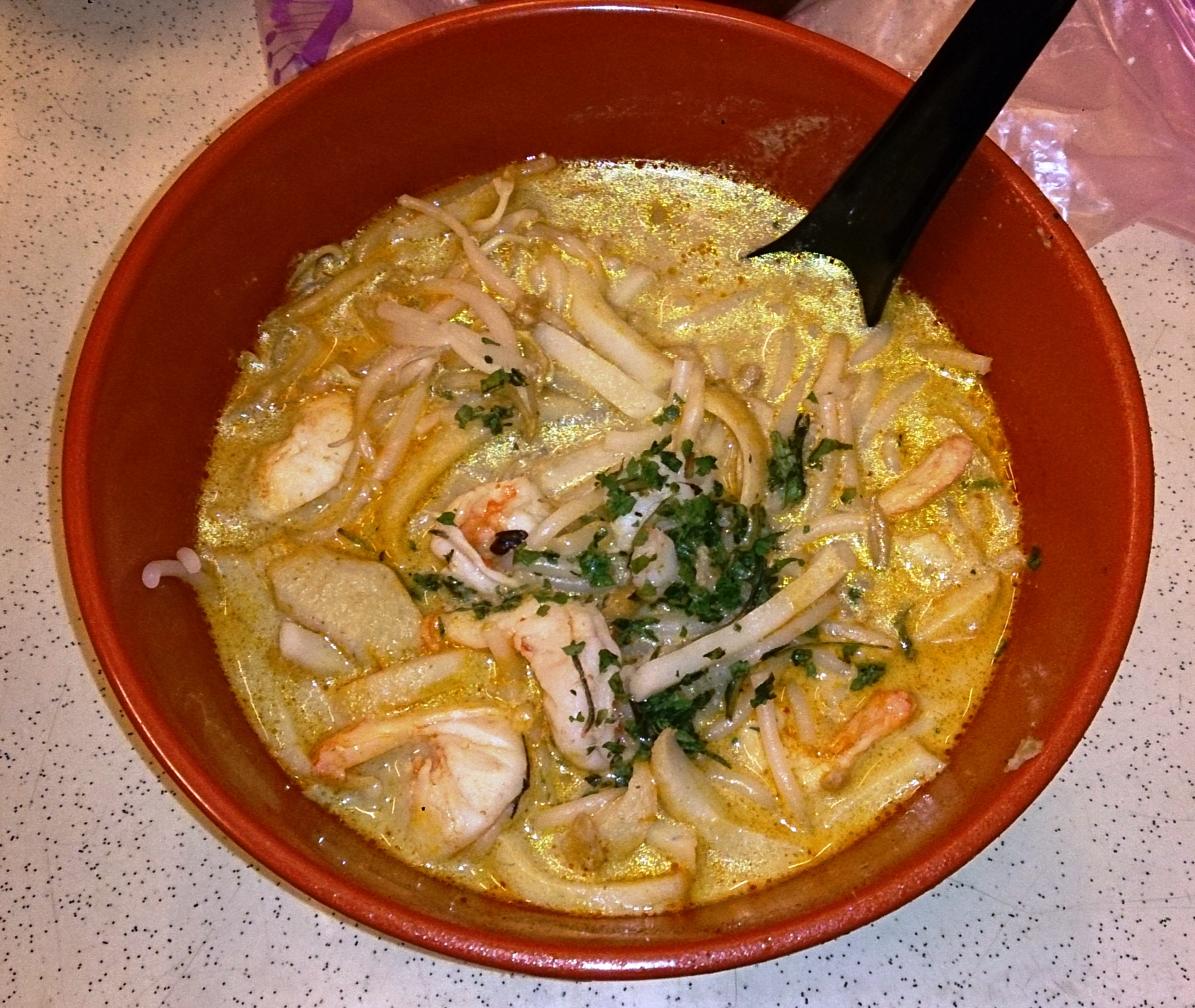
The Katong district is known for its unique laksa dish

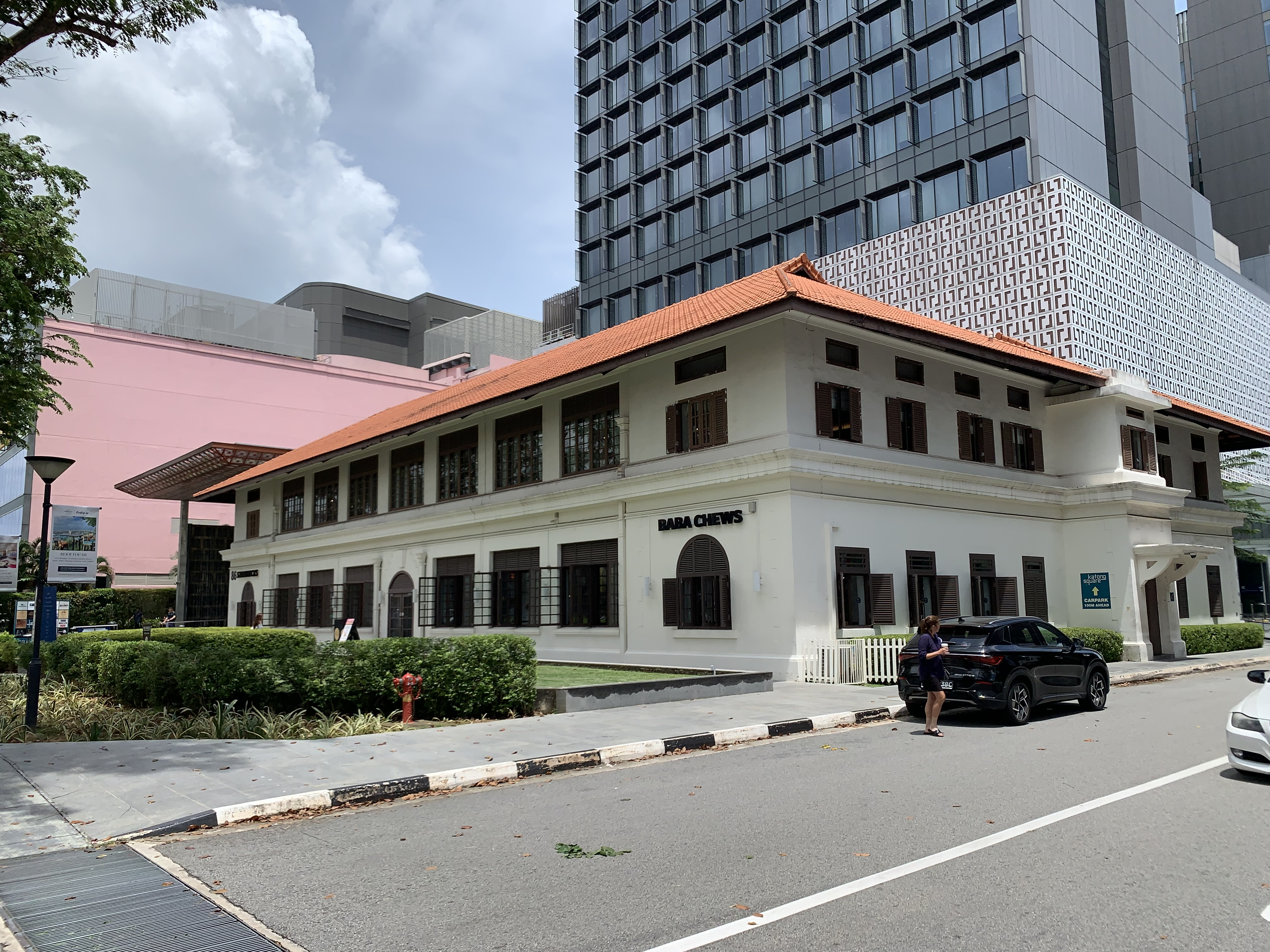
Katong Square's Conservation Building – currently tenanted by a Starbucks

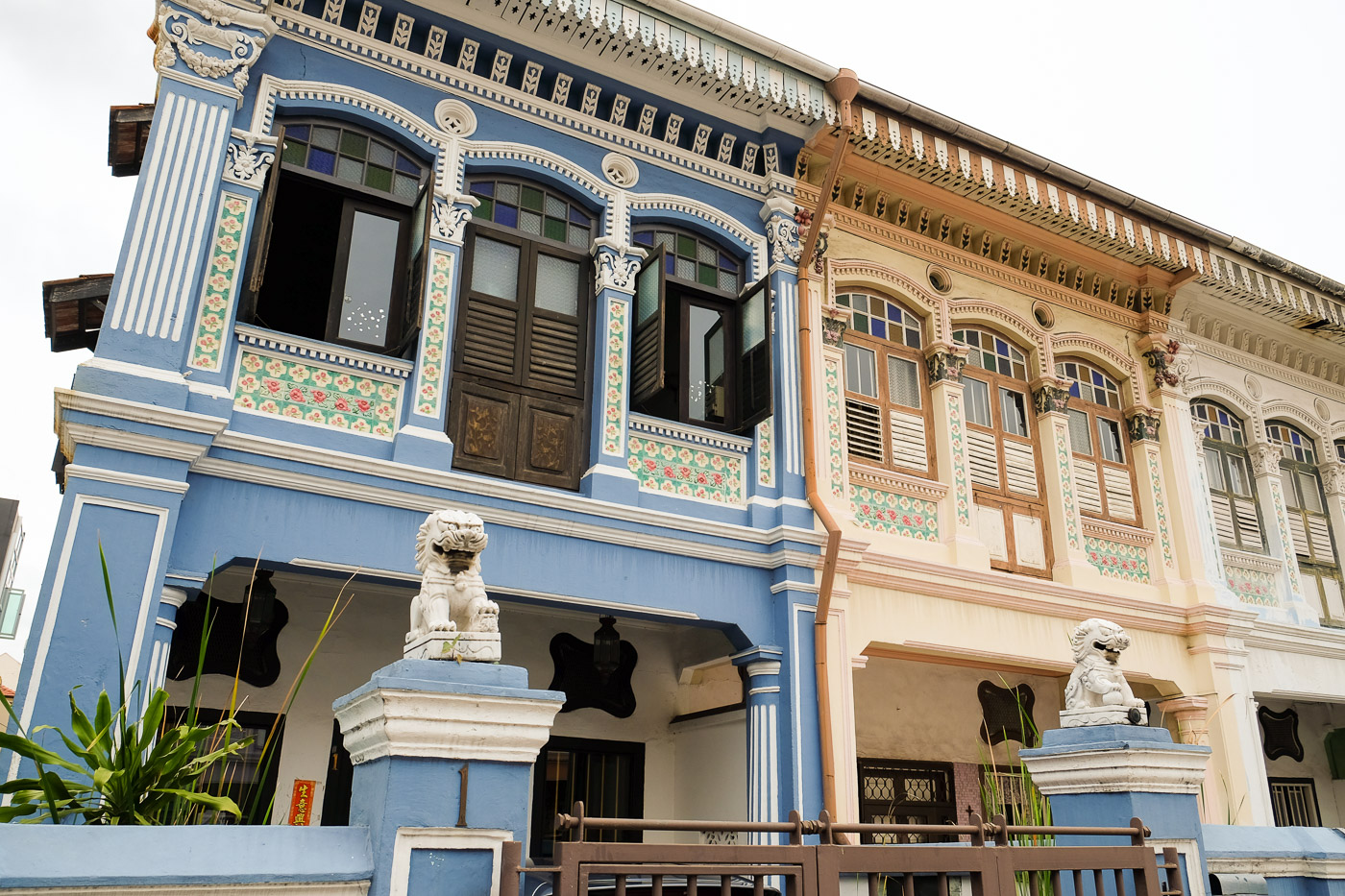
Shophouses at Katong

In 1822, Sir Stamford Raffles designated a plot of land between the tip of Sandy Point (present day Tanjong Rhu) and Deep Water Point (present day Tanjong Katong) as a shipyard. In order to expedite the growth of the shipping industry, the Chinese settlers living there were given compensation for moving out. By the 1860s, the ship yards were flourishing.

In the 1820s, many wealthy Chinese, English, Portuguese, Jewish, and Anglo-French settlers bought parcels of land in Katong beside the sea to cultivate plantations, such as the Confederate Estate, Grove Estate and Perseverance Estate, and built business empires from trading in commodities such as cotton, coconut and gambier. One of them is the Wee family where Thiam Siew Avenue is named after them. Many of these plantations were found beside Grove Road (now Mountbatten Road). Other notable plantation owners included Chew Joo Chiat, Francis James Bernard, Jose d’Almeida, Thomas Dunman and Hoo Ah Kay.

In the 1900s, the city centre was overcrowded and residents started moving to the east. Due to the need of more residential lands, the plantations began to break up. Catholic churches and schools were built in the area which attracted a significant Eurasian presence and Peranakan families. As more people moved into area around Joo Chiat, especially along East Coast Road, there was a big demand for housing, Chew divided his plantation into building lots and sold them to developers to build houses. The area developed from a weekend seaside retreat into a home for the wealthy, who built immense colonial seaside bungalows away from the hustle and bustle of town life. The wealthy suburb stretched along Meyer Road and Mountbatten Road from Katong Park to Tanjong Katong. By 1928 Katong had grown to the extent that the Inspector-General of the Singapore Police Force H. Fairburn remarked: "The development of the area from Katong to Joo Chiat, which has been so rapid in the past two years, promises to continue, and from every point of view one sees the necessity of providing for a sub-divisional station in the suburb. The suburb at present possess no police station."

During the Japanese Occupation of Singapore (1942–1945), shophouses between Wilkinson Road and Goodman Road in Tanjong Katong Road were used to house comfort women from Indonesia and Korea.

The east coast reclamation started in 1966 and lasted for two decades until 1985. Its reclamation changed the physical landscape of the area with the modification of the coastline, landscape and even the removal of Katong jetty. Coupled with new high rise housing estate in East Coast, Katong slowly lost its distinct identity amid this de-territorialisation process.

The late 1970s and early 1980s also saw more road changes where adjacent streets were linked up to ease commute.

In the early 2000s, due to the economic downturn, prices and rentals of shop houses went down leading to many karaoke lounges, massage parlours and pubs in Joo Chiat. Existing hotels started to offer rooms by the hour which helped promoted vice related activities. In 2005, it had 44 pubs, 38 massage parlours and eight hotels which led to Joo Chiat gaining a reputation as a red-light district. By 2010, due to efforts by local residents and policy changes, Joo Chiat had only 26 pubs, three massage parlours and six hotels in 2010.

The present Katong area stretches from Mountbatten Road, East Coast Road to Joo Chiat.

=== Kampong Amber ===
In the early twentieth century, Kampong Amber, a Malay fishing village between East Coast Road and Amber Road, was a prominent landmark in the coastal area of Katong. The village was named after the adjacent Amber Road, which was in turn named after the clan name of Joseph Aaron Elias, a prominent property owner in early-20th-century Singapore.

The inhabitants of Kampong Amber were mostly Malay fishermen, who lived in thatched timber houses on stilts, irregularly clustered into a porous urban fabric. Between these houses were many large communal spaces, where the inhabitants spent much of their time, engaging in activities such as plucking beansprout, pounding chili paste, and talking to their neighbors. Since the salty soil was unfriendly to agriculture, the villagers largely depended on the ocean for their livelihoods.

Just across Amber Road were the beachfront bungalows of wealthy Peranakan businessmen, notably Lee Choon Guan and his wife, who owned the land which Kampong Amber sits on. Mr and Mrs Lee allowed the villagers to live in Kampong Amber rent-free; as a show of appreciation, the villagers held an annual parade on Mrs Lee's birthday.

After World War II, Katong became an active retail and entertainment hub in the 1950s and 1960s, with popular supermarket Tay Buan Guan, Red House Katong Bakery and food specialties such as Katong Laksa.

As part of the 1971 Concept Plan, land reclamation along the East Coast was carried out between 1963 and 1985. This reclaimed land transformed the swampy coastline with its foul smells into a scenic vista of white sandy beaches, and made it a desirable location for high-end residential developments; at the same time, the reclaimed land and increased motor vehicle traffic on the road combined to separate the villagers of Kampong Amber from the ocean on which they depended.

As Singapore continued to industrialise through the 1970s, Kampong Amber was among the kampongs destroyed to make room for economic developments: first four- to eight-storey residential buildings, then high-rise flats. The occupants were relocated to newly built, government-subsidised flats. In a 2003 master plan, the land was parcelled out for further development.

A few remnants of earlier Kampong Amber survived the process of industrialization. The iconic car porch of the Butterfly House, a beachfront bungalow built in 1912 by Regent A. J. Bidwell, was incorporated into a new 18-storey condo. Another surviving early Kampong Amber landmark is the Chinese Swimming Club, founded in 1909 and moved to a permanent site at Amber Road in 1921. Originally a Chinese response to the European-only Singapore Swimming-club founded by the British in 1994, the Chinese Swimming Club was sponsored by wealthy philanthropist Lee Choon Guan. The club went on to become a social gathering place, a training location for many world-class athletes, and a prominent local landmark that drew visits from figures including Prime Minister Lee Kuan Yew, President Wee Kim Wee, and President Tony Tan Keng Yam. Today, the club extends membership to non-Chinese residents.

Katong Apartments was built in 1996 and located at Mangis Road in District 15. After World War II, East Coast Road became an active retail and entertainment hub in the 1950s and 1960s, with popular supermarket Tay Buan Guan, Red House Katong Bakery and food specialties such as Katong Laksa.

In 2011, Joo Chiat was awarded National Heritage Board's inaugural Heritage Town Award and $100,000 as funding to develop heritage activities for the year.

== Transportation ==
An electric tramway was built between the Joo Chiat-Changi Market and Tanjong Pagar, although it does not exist now.

== Amenities ==
Places of worship

- Church of the Holy Family (also known as Holy Family Church and Katong Catholic Church), a Catholic church in the Archdiocese of Singapore, founded in early 1902 by four Eurasian families living in Tanjong Katong. It is located at Chapel Road, off East Coast Road, and has one of the largest parish populations in the archdiocese.
- Masjid Kassim, built at Joo Chiat through waqf donations from a Muslim merchant, Ahna Mohammed Kassim.
- Katong Presbyterian Church was initially built at Joo Chiat Terrace, before moving to Joo Chiat Lane in 1971.
- Mangala Vihara, a Theravada Buddhist temple: in 1959, Madam Chew Quee Neo, daughter of Chew Joo Chiat, donated a piece of land to build the temple, which caters for the Peranakan Buddhist community.

Shopping centres

Katong also has many shopping centers such as Eastgate building, Katong Plaza, i12 Katong (formerly Katong Mall and Katong People's Complex), Katong Shopping Centre, Roxy Square, Paramount Shopping Centre and Odeon Katong Shopping Complex.

Places to eat

There are famous eateries which contribute to Katong's popularity as a dining spot, such as the Red House Bakery and Chin Mee Chin Confectionery.

== Education ==
=== Secondary schools ===
- Tanjong Katong Secondary School
- Tanjong Katong Girls' School

=== Primary schools ===
- Tanjong Katong Primary School

== Highlights ==
The area is traditionally associated with the Eurasian and Peranakan community. However, many high-rise apartment blocks now stand alongside the traditional shophouses and Peranakan terrace houses. In 1993, the Joo Chiat neighbourhood which comprises the historical centre of Katong, with its uniquely Singaporean architecture mixing Chinese, Peranakan and English colonial styles, was designated a national heritage conservation area by the Singapore Government. The conservation area consists of many shop houses which are refurnished into cafes as well as specialty shops.

== Notable residents ==
It was home to the earlier scions of the Englishmen Lord Mountbatten of Burma and Cathay Organisation film magnate, Loke Wan Tho. Its illustrious residents include the ancestral family of Minister Mentor Lee Kuan Yew and Senior Minister Goh Chok Tong. The former President Sellapan Ramanathan lived in Katong in his primary residence on Ceylon Road. It is also home to performance artist Nicholas Tee.

== Notable places ==
- 25 Chapel Road, conserved building

== Politics ==
Most of the Katong division falls under the Marine Parade–Braddell Heights GRC with some of Joo Chiat instead fall under the East Coast GRC. Prior to the 2025 general election, most of Katong fell under the now-defunct Marine Parade GRC where the former Joo Chiat SMC was absorbed into the former GRC in 2015. Law Minister Edwin Tong serves as the MP for Joo Chiat, while Goh Pei Ming and Diana Pang serves as the MPs for the remainder of Katong.

== In popular culture ==
- Katong Miss Oh, a sitcom that aired on MediaCorp Channel 8 in 2002.
- Tanjong Katong is mentioned in a song "Nak Dara Rindu" by actor, filmmaker, musician, and composer P. Ramlee
- Tanjong Katong is mentioned in the Singaporean folk song "Di Tanjong Katong"

== See also ==
- Joo Chiat Road
- Katong laksa
