= Bay Shore (disambiguation) =

Bay Shore may refer to a location in the United States:

- Bay Shore, Michigan, a census-designated place
- Bay Shore, New York, a hamlet and census-designated place in the Town of Islip
  - Bay Shore High School
  - Bay Shore Hose Company No. 1 Firehouse
  - Bay Shore (LIRR station), a railroad station
  - Bay Shore Methodist Episcopal Church
- Bay Shore, Washington, former community
- Bay Shore Beach, Hampton, Virginia
- Bay Shore Historic District, Miami, Florida

== Sports ==
- Bay Shore Stakes, horse race run at Aqueduct Racetrack in Queens, New York
- Bay Shore Brawlers, semi-pro football team based in Laurence Harbor, New Jersey

== See also ==
- Bayshore (disambiguation)
