= Masjid Kampung Siglap =

Mosque located in Bedok, Singapore

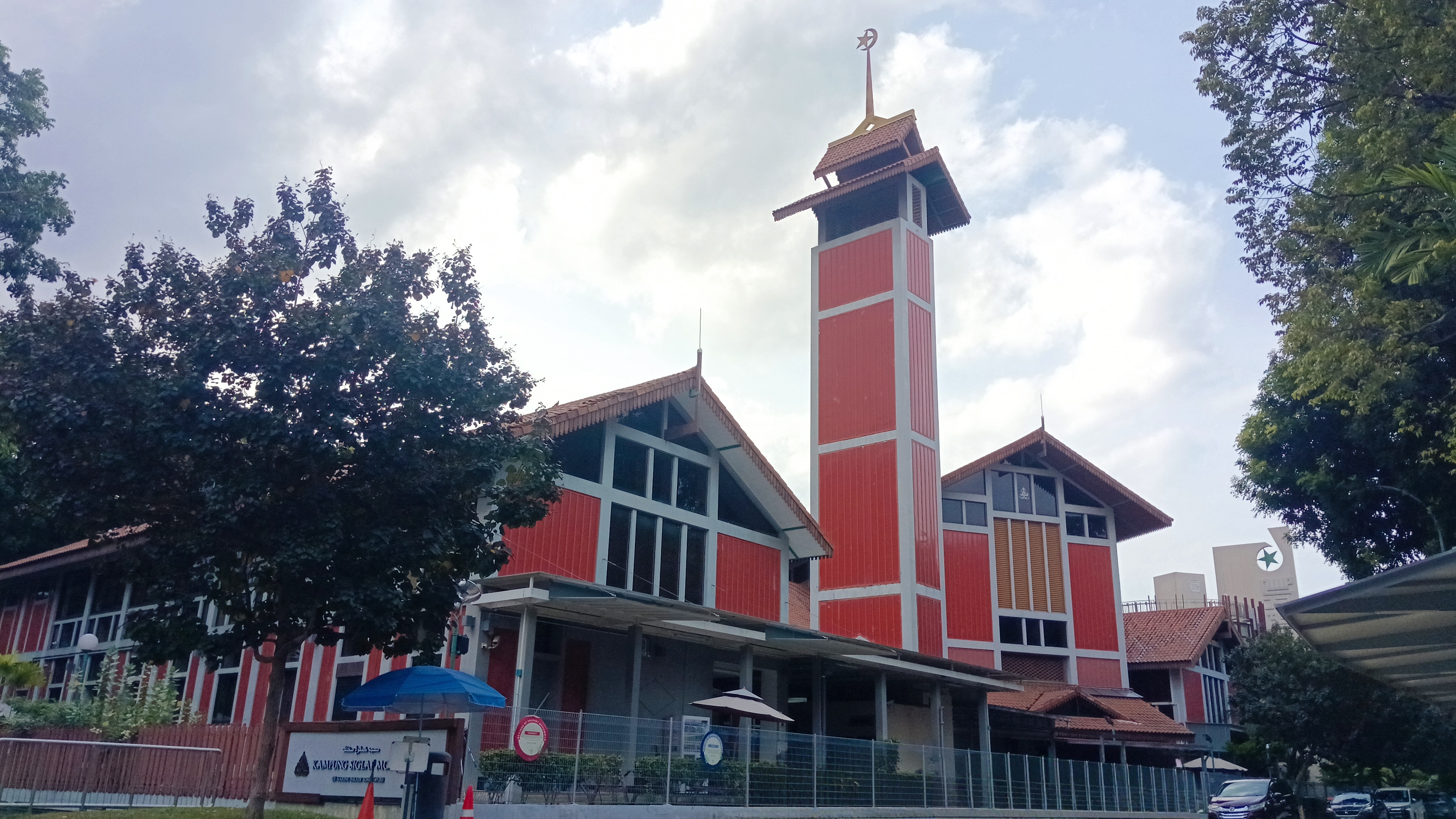
- Main facade of Masjid Kampung Siglap which faces Jalan Kg Siglap.

- Location in Singapore

Religion
- Affiliation: Sunni Islam

Location
- Location: 451 Marine Parade Road, Singapore 449283
- Country: Singapore
- Coordinates: 1.3095885°N 103.9275654°E

Architecture
- Type: Mosque
- Style: Modern, Malay architecture
- Founder: Hajjah Hajijah
- Established: 1846
- Completed: 1912 (original structure); 1992 (current building); 2011 (Reconstruction after fire)
- Destroyed: 6 October 2009 (partial)
- Minaret: 1
- Inscriptions: 1 (Behind the mihrab of old mosque building)

Masjid Kampung Siglap is a mosque located in the Siglap neighbourhood of Bedok, Singapore. Originally built in 1846, the present-day mosque is a religious complex built in 1992, consisting of the main congregational mosque, a madrasa, and the original 19th-century mosque which has been decommissioned but preserved as a classroom and multi-purpose hall.

It is accessible from the Siglap MRT station. The most recent addition to the religious complex is the madrasah, the Tahfiz Al-Qur'an Centre, which was opened in March 2009. The mosque was destroyed in an arson attack on 6 October 2009, but reopened in 2011 after two years of reconstruction works.

== History ==
The original mosque was a wooden surau built in 1846 on land donated by a wealthy Muslim noblewoman, Hajjah Hajijah. The wooden surau was later rebuilt into a full mosque between 1902 and 1912 by a descendant of Tok Lassam, the chieftain of the Siglap village, while an inscription behind the mihrab of the original mosque bears the date of 28 September 1902. After the independence of Singapore, most villages had been redeveloped into modern housing estates, including Siglap, which prompted discussions to rebuild the mosque in 1986 whilst still retaining the old name of the mosque, Masjid Kampung Siglap. Plans for the new mosque were finalized in 1988, with a model of the proposed structure debuting in the same year. Construction on the mosque was completed by 1992. Later in 1994, the mosque won the Certificate of Merit from the Construction Industry Development Board (CIDB). The old mosque building was preserved and converted into a madrasa and multi-purpose hall which stood in the courtyard of the main mosque building. A larger madrasa, the Tahfiz Al-Qur'an Centre, was later built within the grounds of the mosque and unveiled in March 2009. The old mosque was then relegated to being a classroom.

=== 2009 fire ===
On 6 October 2009, a great fire struck the mosque. The upper section of the new mosque, including the minaret, was completely destroyed by the fire and the main prayer hall was deemed unusable. The cause of the fire was found out to be an arson attack by a 14-year-old boy who admitted to playing with matches in the second level of the main prayer hall. No casualties were reported and the congregants and mosque personnel were able to exit the ablaze mosque safely, with the exception of one old man who was given outpatient treatment. Due to the incident, fire insurance became mandatory for all mosques nationwide. The old mosque, which had been decommissioned since the new mosque had been built, was temporarily put back into use.

The reconstruction of the mosque was almost complete by August 2011. Once the reconstruction and safety works had been completed, the mosque was reopened on 31 October of the same year and resumed its usual services. A re-inauguration ceremony was held on 5 November. To avoid similar incidents in future, the safety features of the mosque were improvised, such as the addition of new smoke detectors, emergency devices and more fire extinguishers.

== Architecture ==
Masjid Kampung Siglap is built in a modern architectural style that intends to evoke the style of traditional Malay architecture. The usage of sloped terraced roofs as well as metal sheets on the exterior that mimick wooden planks help to illustrate this point. Intricate carvings of calligraphy as well as flower motifs detail the minbar (pulpit) in the main prayer hall. The old mosque is situated in the courtyard of the mosque and is preserved from the original 1902–1912 reconstruction, retaining all the classical Malay architectural features including tiered roofs.

== Transportation ==
Masjid Kampung Siglap is within walking distance of Exit A of the Siglap MRT station on the Thomson–East Coast Line.

== See also ==
- List of mosques in Singapore
