= Teatro Yerbabruja =

Arts non-profit based in Bay Shore, New York

Teatro Experimental Yerbabruja Inc.
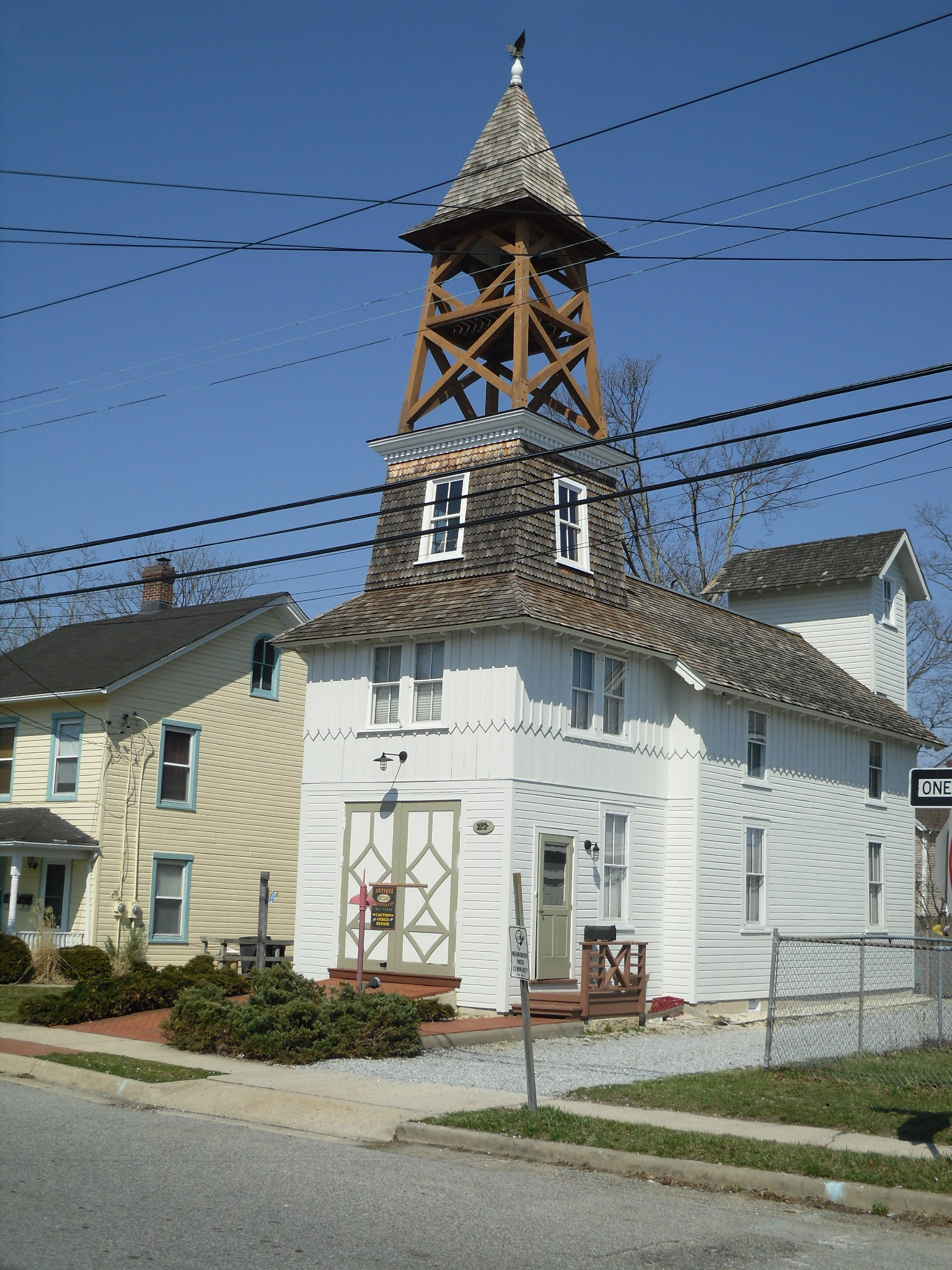
- Current headquarters of Teatro Yerbabruja
- Industry: Theatre, art
- Founded: November 1989; 36 years ago in Puerto Rico, USA
- Founder: Margarita Espada Santos
- Headquarters: 17 Second Avenue, Bay Shore, NY.
- Area served: Long Island, NY.
- Key people: Margarita Espada] (artistic director); Hypatia Martinez (president); Steven Bard (chairman), 2004–present
- Website: teatroyerbabruja.org

Teatro Experimental Yerbabruja Inc., commonly referred to as simply Teatro Yerbabruja, is a theater, performing arts, and visual arts nonprofit organization, headquartered in Bay Shore, New York, most known for its activism on Long Island regarding Hispanic, Latino, Black, and other BIPOC communities.

== History ==
Teatro Experimental Yerbabruja Inc. was founded in November 1989 in Puerto Rico by Aurelio Lima, Jacqueline O'Neill, and Margarita Espada, a Puerto-Rican artist, educator, and activist After Espada's immigration to New York in the year 1996, Espada prompted Yerbabruja's expansion to Long Island in 2004, due to the lack of spaces for Latinx artists to create, present and offer artistic programming to the community of color on Long Island.

The company was named after the Yerbabruja, a plant with 'healing remedies' that thrives even in adverse conditions, that primarily grows in Puerto Rico and the wider Caribbean. In the "Primer Simposio de Caribe 2000", Espada detailed the origin of the name Yerbabruja,

"Necesitábamos un nombre con la misma fuerza de los grupos anteriores, así que después de mil discusiones sobre el tema nos decidimospor Yerbabruja. Como la definiera nuestro poeta nacional Juan Antonio Corretjer en su libro Yerba Bruja, esta planta de nuestros campos tiene poderes curativos, y la cualidad mágica de reproducirse bajo cualquier circunstancia. De Corretjer heredamos la Yerbabruja como símbolo de resistencia nacional."

"We needed a name with the same force as the previous groups, so after a thousand discussions on the subject We decided on Yerbabruja (Witch's Herb). As our national poet Juan Antonio Corretjer defined it in his book Yerba Bruja, this plant grown in our fields has healing powers and the magical quality of reproducing under any circumstance. From Corretjer, we inherited Yerbabruja as a symbol of national resistance."

== Performances ==
In 2009, Espada and Yerbabruja oversaw the play, “What Killed Marcelo Lucero?,” a play that explored the social and political reasons for the tragic killing of undocumented immigrant Marcelo Lucero in Patchogue, NY. by four Long Island teens. This play was part of a theater exhibition regarding hate crimes towards Hispanic and Latino immigrants on Long Island.

== Events ==
Teatro Yerbabruja manages the Long Island Puerto Rican and Hispanic Day Parade, which takes place in Brentwood annually. Yerbabruja began overseeing the event in 2011, after they championed funding and a revival of the event, after the parade was almost cancelled due to lack of funding.

== Second Avenue firehouse and gallery ==
Yerbabruja's headquarters is located at 17 Second Avenue, Bay Shore, NY. which is the historic site of the Bay Shore Hose Company No. 1 Firehouse. Teatro moved into this location in 2018, and promptly bought the property in September 2023, from the South Side Restoration Group.
