= Marine Terrace MRT station =

Mass Rapid Transit station in Singapore

Marine Terrace TE27 马林台 மரீன் டெரஸ்
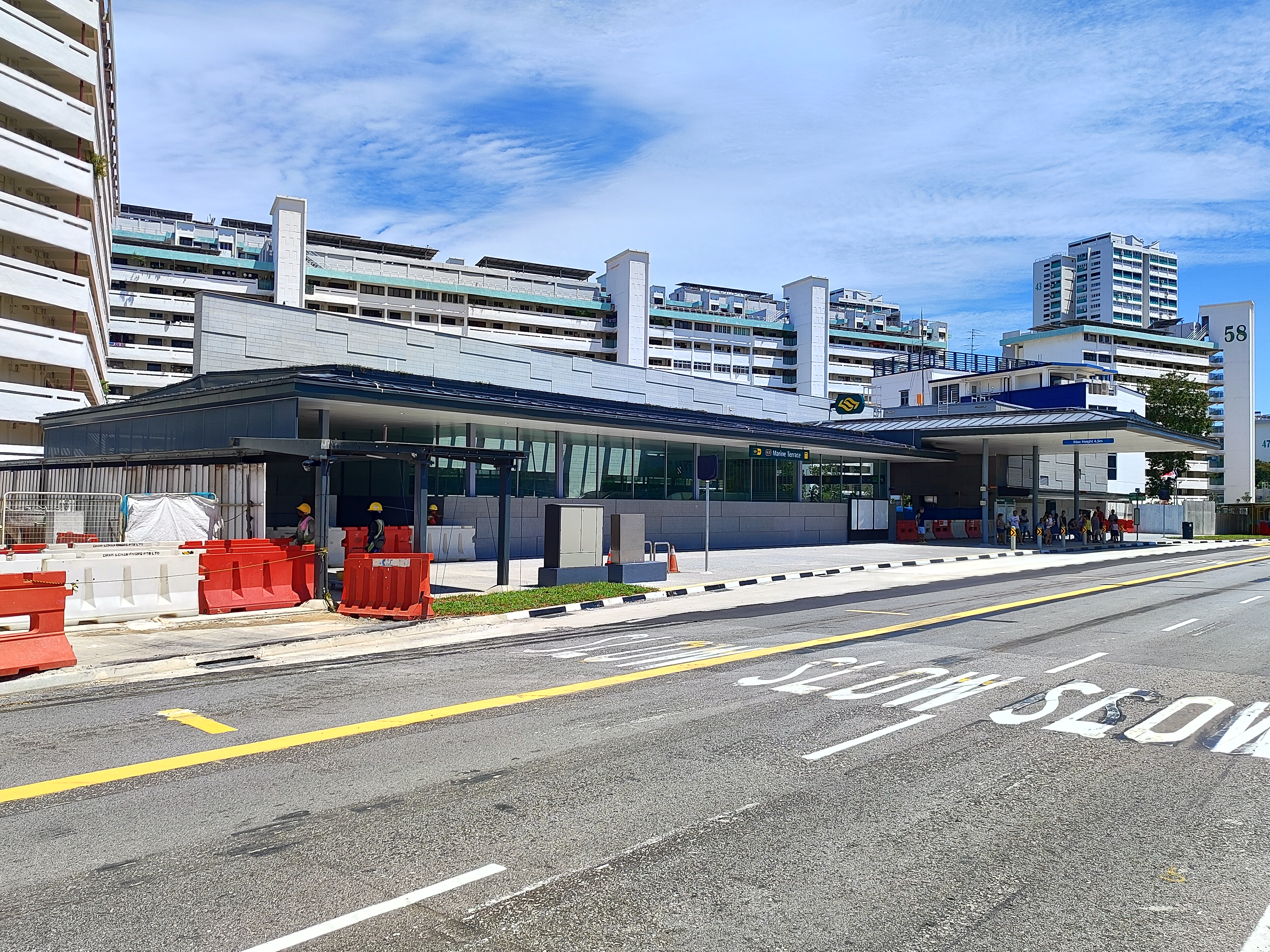
- Exit 1 of Marine Terrace

General information
- Location: 304 Marine Parade Road, Singapore 449970
- Coordinates: 01°18′24″N 103°54′54″E
- System: Mass Rapid Transit (MRT) station
- Owner: Land Transport Authority
- Operator: SMRT Trains
- Line: Thomson–East Coast Line
- Platforms: 2 (1 island platform)
- Tracks: 2
- Connections: Bus, Taxi

Construction
- Structure type: Underground
- Platform levels: 1
- Cycle facilities: Yes
- Accessible: Yes

Other information
- Station code: MTC

History
- Opened: 23 June 2024; 2 years ago

Services
Preceding station	Mass Rapid Transit	Following station
Marine Parade towards Woodlands North	Thomson–East Coast Line	Siglap towards Bayshore
Track layout
Location
- Location within Singapore Rail central area

Marine Terrace MRT station is an underground Mass Rapid Transit station on the Thomson–East Coast Line (TEL). Located in the Marine Parade estate, it serves many schools in the area as well as the Marine Terrace Market and Food Centre.

First announced in August 2014, Marine Terrace station was to be constructed as part of the eastern stretch of the TEL. Construction started by July 2016, with initial expected completion by 2023 but was moved a year later due to the COVID-19 pandemic. It commenced operations on 23 June 2024 along with the other stations in Stage 4 of the TEL.

Marine Terrace is one of the first MRT stations to feature underground bicycle parking lots. An Art-in-Transit artwork, A seat at the end of the long, long, long table by Moses Tan, is displayed in the station.

== History ==
In August 2014, the Land Transport Authority (LTA) announced that Marine Terrace station would be part of the proposed Thomson–East Coast Line (TEL), with the station to be constructed as part of the TEL's eastern stretch, consisting of 9 stations between Tanjong Rhu and Sungei Bedok.

For the entire month of October 2015, there was a public poll for the names of stations in the eastern portion of the TEL, including Marine Terrace, where its alternative proposed name was "Telok Kurau". Following the poll, it was announced in July 2016 that the station name will be Marine Terrace.

The LTA announced in January 2016 that a S$361 million contract for the design and construction of Marine Terrace station and 1.78 kilometres (1.11 miles) of its associated tunnels had been awarded to Ssangyong Engineering & Construction Co. Ltd. – Hyundai Engineering & Construction Co., Ltd. Joint Venture. Construction started by July 2016. By 2019, Marine Terrace along with other stations in the Tanjong Rhu-Bayshore stretch were designated to be 'Stage 4' of the TEL.

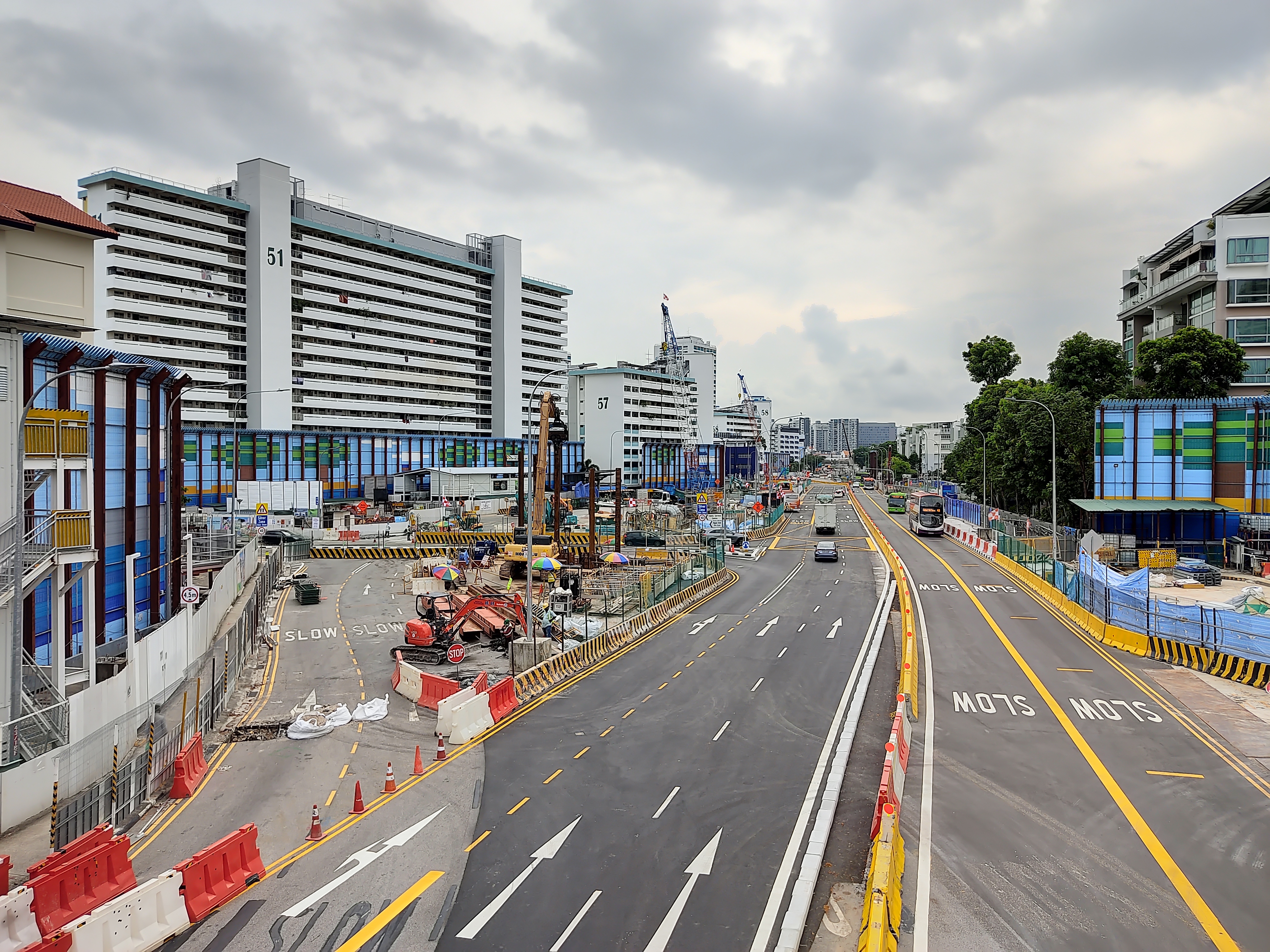
Marine Terrace station under construction

Initially expected to open in 2023, it was pushed to 2024 along other TEL Stage 4 stations due to delays from the COVID-19 pandemic. In October 2022, it was announced that Stage 4 of the TEL was expected to open in 2024. In February 2024, the LTA handed over the TEL Stage 4 stations to SMRT Trains for testing final testings. A month later, the LTA announced that the station would open on 23 June, with an open house event held between 10:00 am and 9:00 pm on 21 June to allow commuters to familiarise themselves with the new stations. During the opening house, there was a Caring SG Commuters booth at the station, where visitors could be educated about programs that make public transport more inclusive and learn how to assist others with mobility needs. Marine Terrace station opened on 23 June 2024.

== Details ==
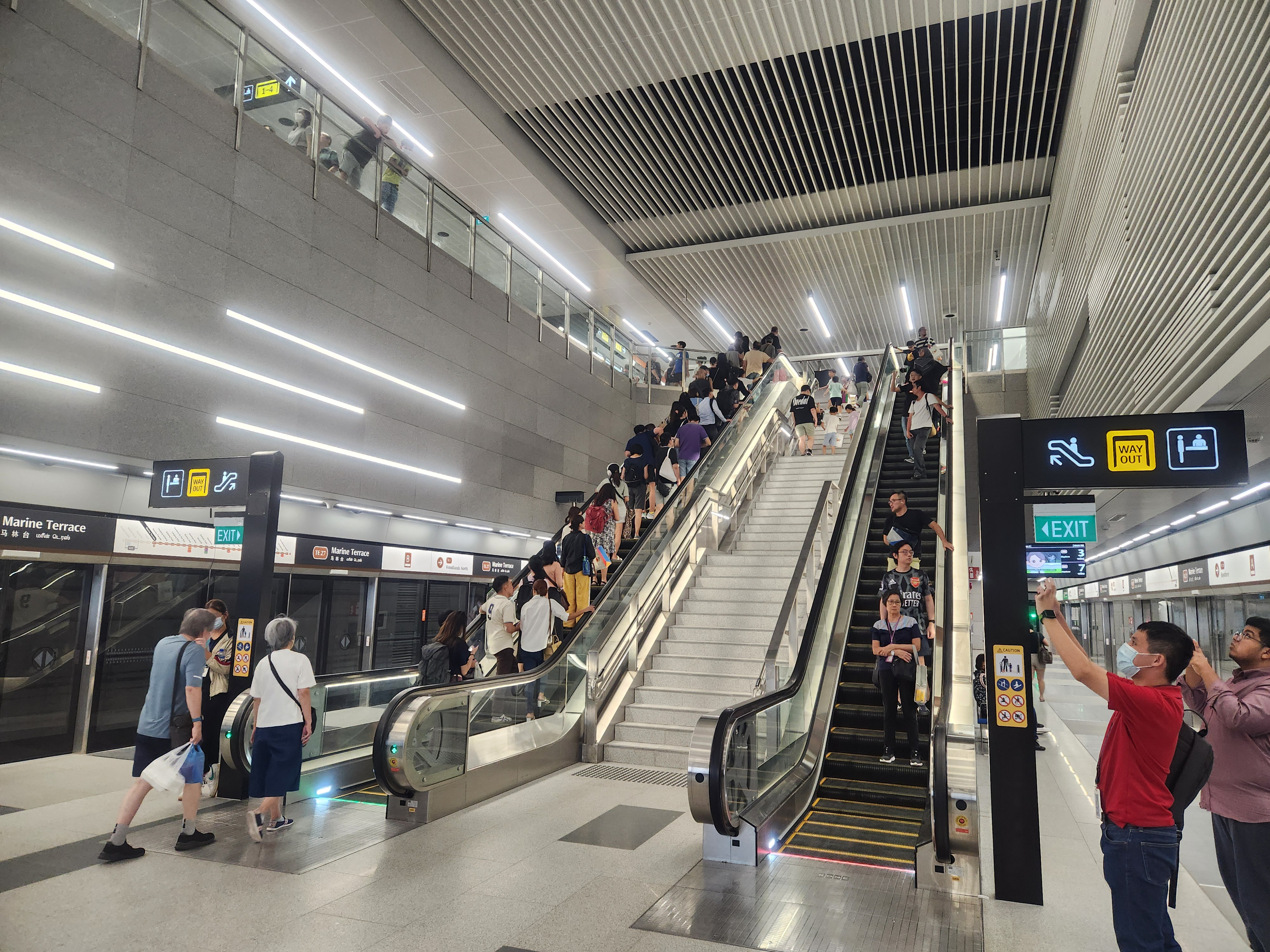
The platform of Marine Terrace station

Marine Terrace station serves the TEL and is between Siglap and Marine Parade stations, with an official station code of TE27. As part of the TEL, the station is operated by SMRT Corporation. The station operates between 5:41 am and 12:25 am daily. Train frequencies vary from 3 minutes during peak hours to an average of 6 minutes for off-peak hours. Located in the Marine Parade estate, the station has six exits serving nearby landmarks within its vicinity, mainly schools such as Tao Nan School, CHIJ (Katong) Primary School, CHIJ Katong Convent, St. Patrick's School and Victoria Junior College but also others like Marine Terrace Market and Food Centre. It also has two drop-off points and is wheelchair accessible.

The station has an island platform configuration. It also spans 440 metres (480 yd) and has an area of 17,303 square metres (4.276 acres). As stated by station designer SAA Architects, each entrance of the station was designed to be a public gathering space without being "too overwhelming in space". It also has two 24-hour subways underneath Marine Parade Road. According to the LTA, the station also has a motif of horizontality, reminiscent of HDB blocks. It is one of the first 3 stations on the MRT network to contain underground bicycle parking spaces, along with Marine Parade and Bayshore stations, with Marine Terrace containing 202 bicycle parking lots as well as bicycle lifts. There are also specially designed stairs to allow people to wheel bicycles up and down the slopes. As with the other TEL4 stations, hybrid cooling fans at the platforms complement the station's air-conditioning to improve air circulation while lowering energy consumption. It is also designated as a Civil Defence shelter.

A seat at the end of the long, long, long table by Moses Tan is displayed at this station as part of the Art-in-Transit programme, a showcase of public artworks on the MRT network. The mural explores family roots and history through a family tree with different types of chairs to represent different generations and cultures. Tan said that he "was interested in how different family members have different parts of the house that they enjoyed" and worked with four different families in the Marine Terrace area to create the artwork by using family portraits and pictures as reference images.
