= Siglap MRT station =

Mass Rapid Transit station in Singapore

Siglap TE28 实乞纳 சிக்லாப்
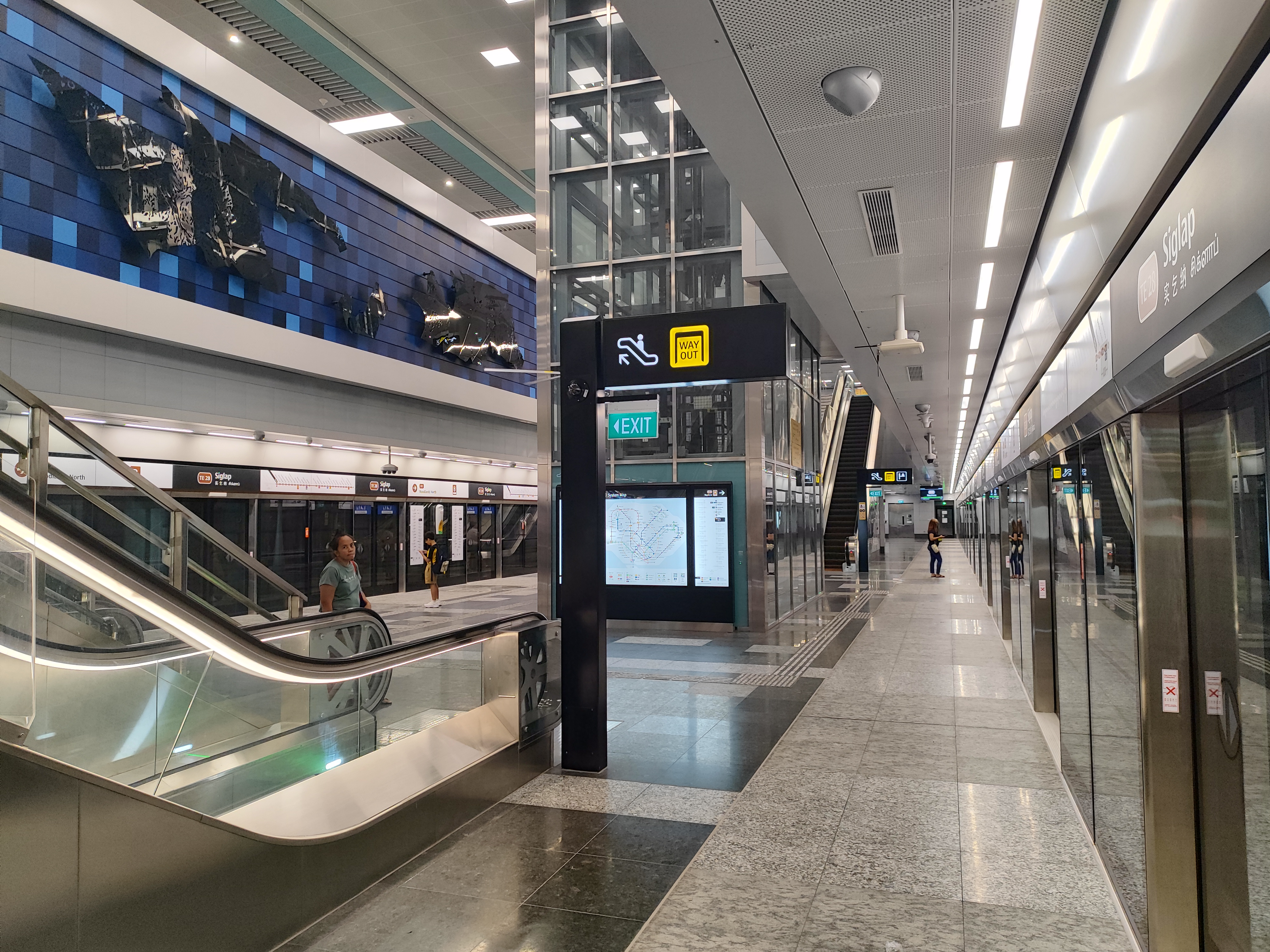
- Station platforms

General information
- Location: 1000 Marine Parade Road, Singapore 449969
- Coordinates: 01°18′35″N 103°55′44″E
- System: Mass Rapid Transit (MRT) station
- Owner: Land Transport Authority
- Operator: SMRT Trains
- Line: Thomson–East Coast Line
- Platforms: 2 (1 island platform)
- Tracks: 2
- Connections: Bus, Taxi

Construction
- Structure type: Underground
- Platform levels: 1
- Cycle facilities: Yes
- Accessible: Yes

Other information
- Station code: SGL

History
- Opened: 23 June 2024; 2 years ago

Services
Preceding station	Mass Rapid Transit	Following station
Marine Terrace towards Woodlands North	Thomson–East Coast Line	Bayshore Terminus
Track layout
Location
- Location within Singapore Rail

Siglap MRT station (Note: IPA: /ˈsɪɡlɑːp, -ʌp/ SIH-glahp or SIH-glup) is an underground Mass Rapid Transit (MRT) station on the Thomson–East Coast Line (TEL) in Siglap, Singapore. The station serves nearby landmarks such as Victoria School and St. Andrew's Autism Centre, as well as Area E of East Coast Park.

Announced on 15 August 2014, Siglap station was to be constructed as part of the eastern stretch of the TEL. Construction started by July 2016, with initial expected completion by 2023 but was moved a year later due to the COVID-19 pandemic. It commenced operations on 23 June 2024 along with the other stations in Stage 4 of the TEL.

The station features two artworks, The Darkness which Reveals by Melissa Tan as part of the Art in Transit (AIT) Programme and Journey Across Sunlight: A Siglap Mosaic by Brian Gothong Tan under the Gift of Art (GoA) Programme.

== History ==
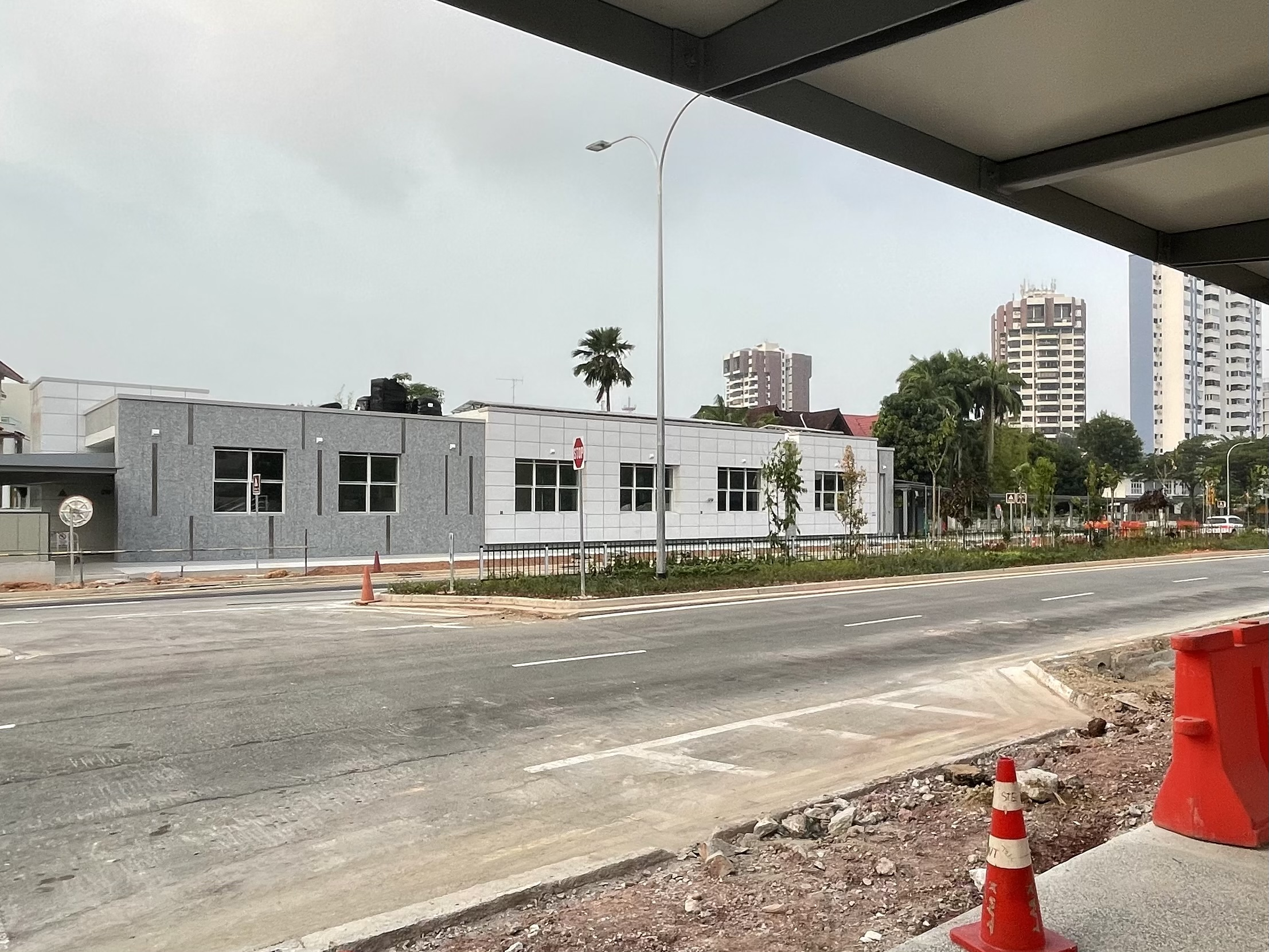
Exit 3 of the station during construction in 2023

In August 2014, the Land Transport Authority (LTA) announced that Siglap station would be part of the proposed Thomson–East Coast Line (TEL), with the station to be constructed as part of the TEL's eastern stretch, consisting of 9 stations between Tanjong Rhu and Sungei Bedok.

For the entire month of October 2015, there was a public poll for the names of stations in the eastern portion of the TEL, including Siglap, where its alternative proposed name was "Siglap South". Following the poll, it was announced in July 2016 that the station name will be Siglap.

By March 2016, it was revealed that a joint venture between John Holland Pty Ltd and Zhen Hua Engineering Pte Ltd was awarded a S$176 million (2016) (US$127.4 million) contract for the construction of Siglap station, with construction started by July 2016. By 2019, Siglap along with other stations in the Tanjong Rhu-Bayshore stretch were designated to be 'Stage 4' of the TEL (TEL4).

Initially expected to be completed in 2023, it was pushed to 2024 along other TEL4 stations due to delays from the COVID-19 pandemic. In October 2022, it was announced that Stage 4 of the TEL was expected to open in 2024. In February 2024, the LTA handed over the TEL4 stations to SMRT Trains for test runs. A month later, the LTA announced that the station would open on 23 June, with an open house event held between 10:00 am and 9:00 pm on 21 June to allow commuters to familiarise themselves with the new stations. During the opening house, there was a Graciousness photo booth and a Singapore Civil Defence Force (SCDF) booth, where visitors could learn about Civil Defence Shelters and lifesaving skills at the latter. Siglap station opened on 23 June 2024.

== Station details ==
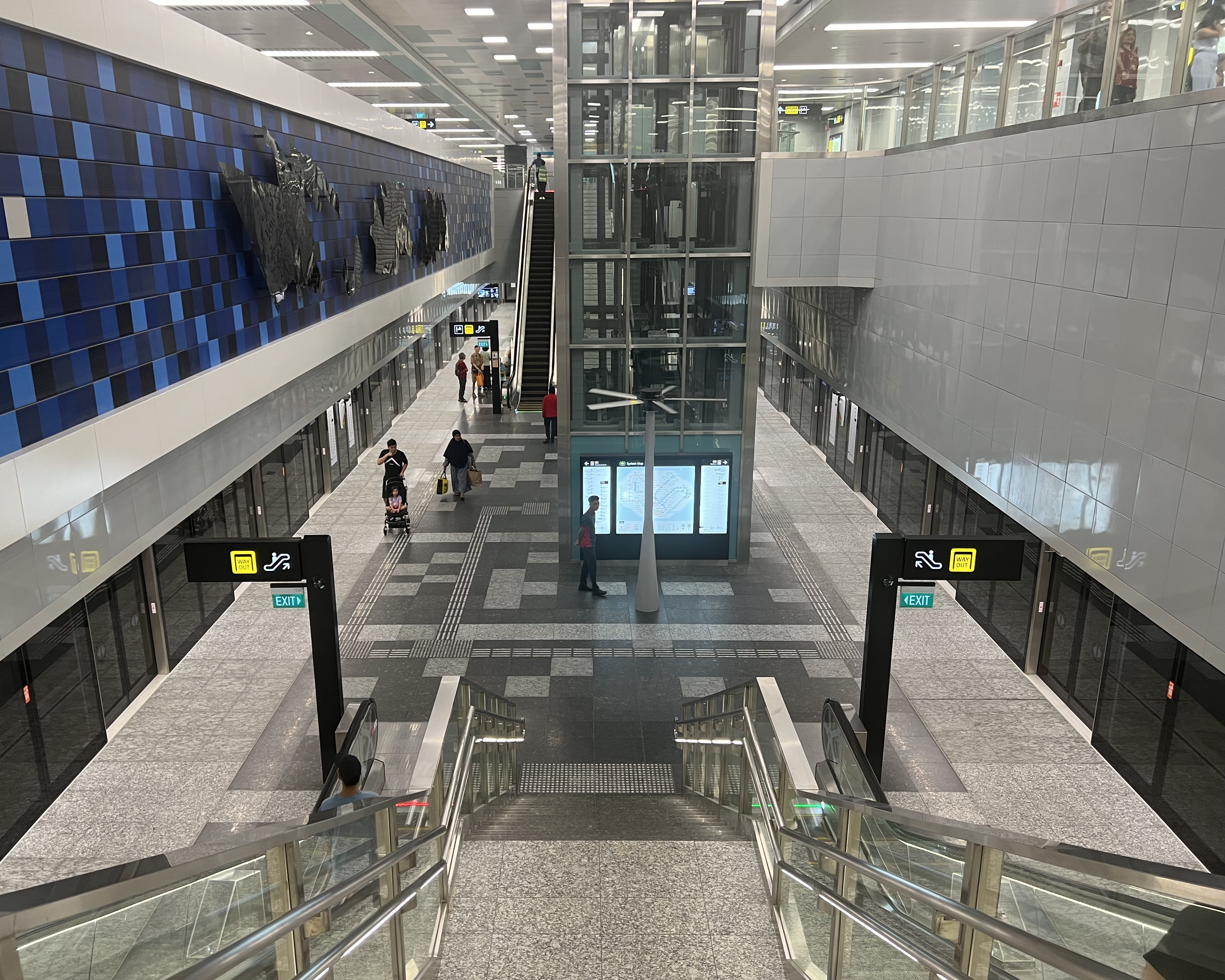
Platform level of the station, with The Darkness which Reveals visible on the left

Siglap station serves the TEL and is between Marine Terrace and Bayshore stations, with an official station code of TE28. As part of the TEL, the station is operated by SMRT Trains. The station operates between 5:58 am and 00:31 pm on Mondays to Saturdays and 6:18 am to 12:31 am for Sundays and public holidays. Train frequencies vary from 3 minutes during peak hours to an average of 6 minutes for off peak hours.

Situated around Marine Parade Road, Siglap has four exits serving two schools within its vicinity, Victoria School and St. Andrew's Autism Centre and School. It also serves other nearby landmarks such as the Masjid Kampung Siglap, Sekolah Indonesia, and Wisma Mendaki, as well as landmarks in East Coast Park Area E such as the East Coast Seafood Centre and Singapore Wake Park. It also has two drop-off points and is wheelchair accessible. The station has an island platform configuration. Siglap features modular cubes as a motif, which is present in the exits to create skylight and continues into the station's platforms. It also has a green roof mimicking the nearby Siglap Linear Park. As with the other TEL4 stations, hybrid cooling fans at the platforms complement the station's air-conditioning to improve air circulation while lowering energy consumption for the station. Siglap is also designated as a Civil Defence shelter.

=== Public artworks ===
Siglap features two public artworks. The Darkness which Reveals by Melissa Tan is displayed at the station as part of the Art in Transit (AIT) programme, a showcase of public artworks on the MRT network. The artwork features fragmented sculptures made of layers of steel against a blue wall, with holes in the steel symbolising the shadows of the moon as well as how darkness can reveal instead of conceal. The artwork takes inspiration from the station's name which means "darkness that conceals" and is derived from the Malay word gelap, which was used by the chieftain of Kampung Siglap Tok Lasam during the naming of the place as he arrived to the area in the 19th century during a solar eclipse. Tan used Google Maps to explore the moon's surface when creating the artwork and discovered how the moon's shadows revealed its uneven terrain.

The second public artwork featured in Siglap station is Journey Across Sunlight: A Siglap Mosaic by Brian Gothong Tan, which was donated under the Gift of Art (GoA) programme, an art programme that allows individuals and organisations to donate or sponsor art pieces. Commissioned by Lim Eng Chong and other alumni of Victoria School, the glass mosaic is inspired by the works of Iskandar Jalil's ceramics and Edwin Thumboo's poetry, both Victoria School alumni. The artwork's background uses Iskandar Blue, a shade of blue commonly used by Iskandar, whilst motifs of Siglap and Victoria School as well as an excerpt of Thumboo's Victoria at Siglap superimposed in the front.
