= Bayshore =

Bayshore may refer to:

== Communities ==
Canada:

- Bayshore, Ottawa, Ontario

United States:

- Bayshore, neighborhood in the Upper Eastside of the city of Miami, Florida
- Bayshore, Daly City, California
- Bayshore City, California, a formerly (1932-1940) incorporated area
- Bayshore (Miami Beach), Florida, a neighborhood
- Bayshore Gardens, Florida, census-designated place
- Bayshore, North Carolina, census-designated place
- Bayshore, Oregon, census-designated place
- The Raritan Bayshore region in New Jersey

== Roads ==
- Bayshore Boulevard in Tampa, Florida, United States
- Bayshore Freeway, the name of a segment of US Route 101 in California
- The Bayshore Route of Shuto Expressway, a stretch of toll highway in Greater Tokyo, Japan

== Facilities ==
Canada:

- Bayshore Shopping Centre, Ottawa, Ontario
- Bayshore station (Ottawa), transit bus terminal in Ottawa
- Harry Lumley Bayshore Community Centre, Owen Sound, Ontario

Singapore

- Bayshore MRT station, a rapid transit station in Singapore

United States:

- Bayshore station (Caltrain), rail station near San Francisco, California
- Bayshore Community Hospital, Holmdel, New Jersey
- Bayshore Town Center, retail complex in Glendale, Wisconsin

== Broadcasting ==
- Bayshore Broadcasting Corporation, a radio station group owner in Ontario, Canada

== See also ==
- Bay Shore (disambiguation)
