= Bay Shore Brawlers =

The Bay Shore Brawlers are a semi-pro football team based in Laurence Harbor, New Jersey. Their home field is at the Little League Complex, at the senior field.

The Brawlers compete in the Pennsylvania 6 Man Football League. In 2006, the Brawlers were known as the Aberdeen/Bayshore Celtics and went undefeated and went on to win the league championship, in their inaugural season. For the 2007 season the Bayshore Brawlers will not be charging admission for their home games, though the team will be collecting non-perishable items that will be donated to local food pantries throughout the Bayshore. After finishing the regular season with a 5-1 record the Brawlers would win their 2nd Keystone Bowl over the Williamsport Wildcats. The Brawlers' second home game will be played on August 2 with a 12 PM kickoff. Admission is still free of charge for the '08 season. The Brawlers were founded by former Arena and European Fullback, William C. Smith III.

== Season-by-season ==
Season records
Season	W	L	T	Finish	Playoff results	
Aberdeen/Bayshore Celtics (P6MFL)
2006	6	0	0	1st Northern	Won ND Championship (Susquehanna Valley); Won Keystone Bowl II (Middletown)	
Bay Shore Brawlers (P6MFL)
2007	5	1	0	1st Southern	Won SD Divisional (Lykens); Won Keystone Bowl III (Williamsport)	
Totals	15	1	0			Opponent
J	vs. Sunbury Devils W 73-6					
August 18	@ Williamsport Wildcats W 38-22					
August 25	vs. Middletown Renegades W 76-19					
September 8	@ Susquehenna Valley Stallions W 45-0					
