= Bayshore MRT station =

Mass Rapid Transit station in Singapore

Bayshore TE29 碧湾 பேஷோர்
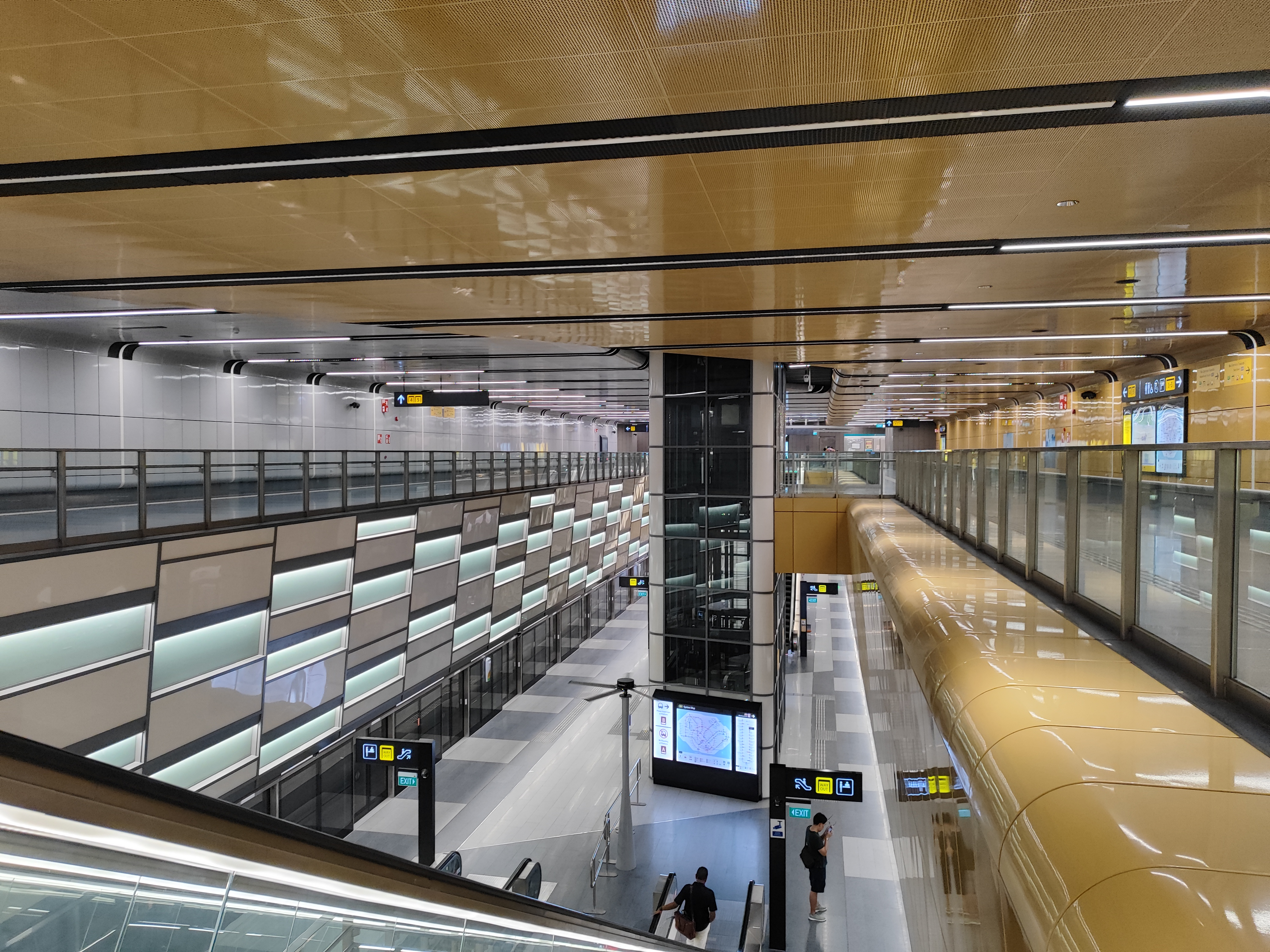
- Station platforms

General information
- Location: 31 Bayshore Road, Singapore 469958
- Coordinates: 01°18′53″N 103°56′37″E
- System: Mass Rapid Transit (MRT) station
- Owner: Land Transport Authority
- Operator: SMRT Trains
- Line: Thomson–East Coast Line
- Platforms: 2 (1 island platform)
- Tracks: 2
- Connections: Bus, Taxi

Construction
- Structure type: Underground
- Platform levels: 1
- Cycle facilities: Yes
- Accessible: Yes

Other information
- Station code: BSR

History
- Opened: 23 June 2024; 2 years ago
- Former names: Bedok Jetty

Services
Preceding station	Mass Rapid Transit	Following station
Siglap towards Woodlands North	Thomson–East Coast Line	Terminus
Siglap towards Woodlands North	Thomson–East Coast Line Future service	Bedok South towards Sungei Bedok
Track layout
Location
- Location within Singapore Rail

Bayshore MRT station is an underground Mass Rapid Transit (MRT) station on the Thomson–East Coast Line (TEL) in Bedok, Singapore. Located along Bayshore Road, the station serves various private residential estates and landmarks such as Calvary Assembly of God Church and Holy Grace Presbyterian Church.

First announced in August 2014, Bayshore station was constructed as part of TEL Phase 4. The station commenced operations on 23 June 2024. A designated Civil Defence shelter, the station is one of the first MRT stations to feature underground bicycle parking lots. Inspired by raintrees, the station entrances feature timber roofs supported by outward-leaning columns. An Art-in-Transit artwork, Farther Shores, by Bruce Quek is displayed at this station.

== History ==
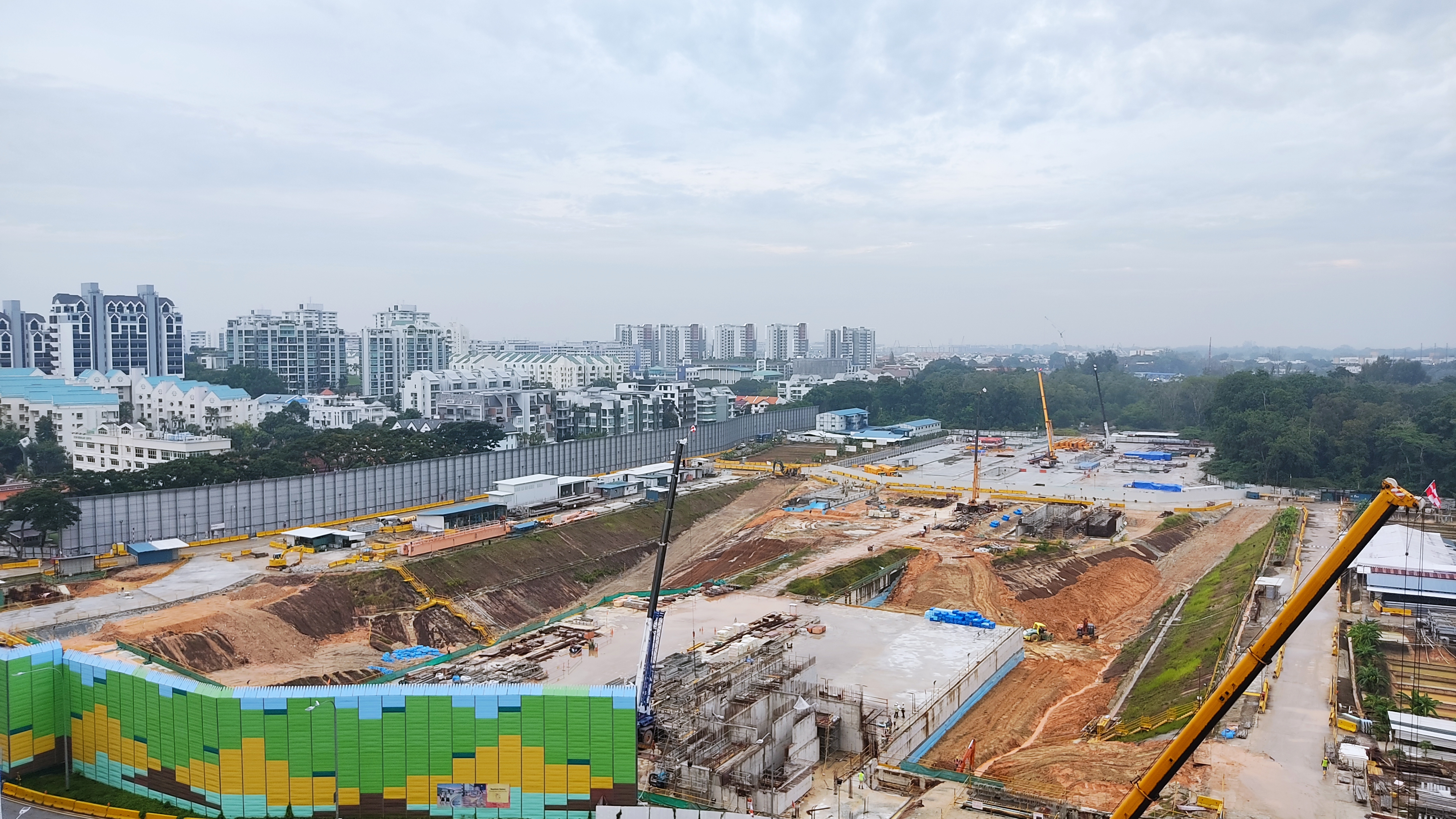
The construction site of the station in 2020

On 15 August 2014, the Land Transport Authority (LTA) announced that Bayshore station would be part of the proposed Thomson–East Coast Line (TEL). The station would be constructed as part of Phase 4 (TEL4), consisting of 8 stations from Tanjong Rhu to this station.

The contract for the design and construction of Bayshore station was awarded to a joint venture between Woh Hup (Private) Ltd and Shanghai Tunnel Engineering Co (Singapore) Pte Ltd in March 2016. The S$295.9 million (US$214.2 million) contract included constructing 4.3 kilometres (2.7 miles) of associated bored tunnels. Construction was scheduled to commence in 2016 with an expected completion date in 2023.

With restrictions imposed on construction due to the COVID-19 pandemic, the TEL4 completion date was pushed by a year to 2024. On 5 March 2024, the LTA announced that the station would open on 23 June that year. An open house for the TEL4 stations was held on 21 June, with the booths of SportSG and People's Association set up at this station. The opening of Bayshore station was welcomed by many residents in the area as the TEL4 could provide a direct route from their homes to their workplaces in the Central Business District.

== Details ==
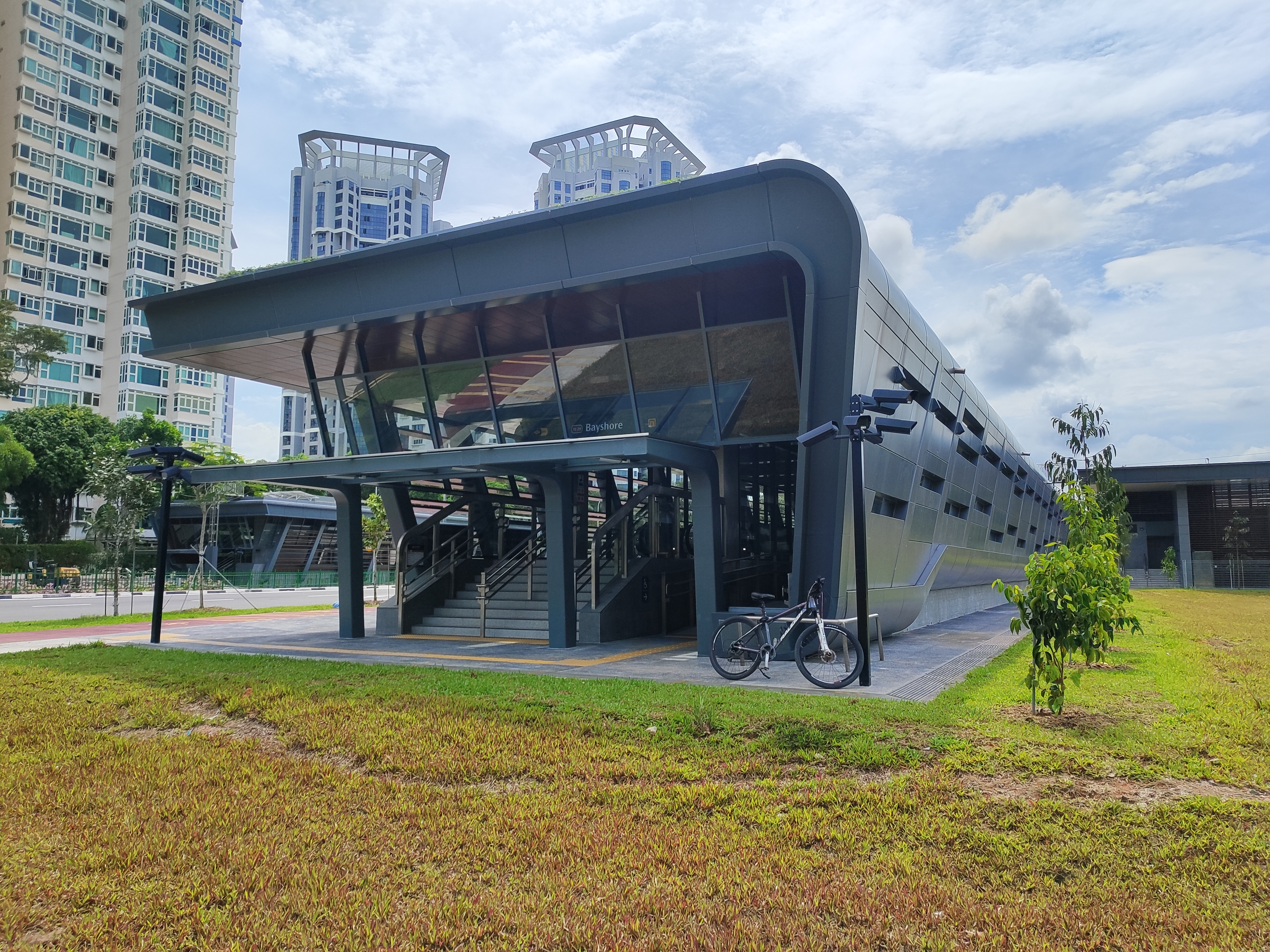
Exit 1 of Bayshore station

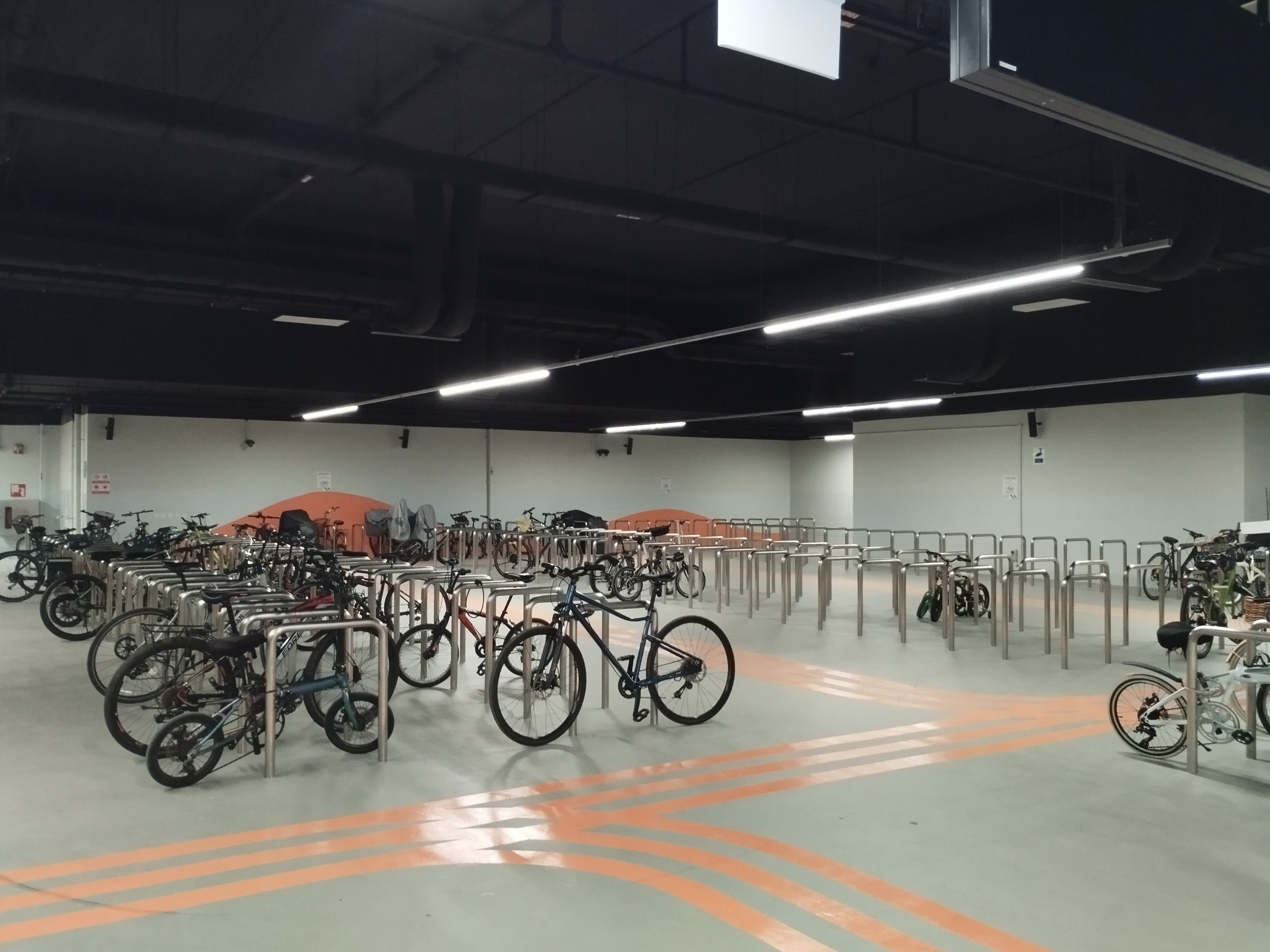
Bicycle parking spots in Bayshore station

Bayshore station is the terminus of the TEL and the adjacent station is Siglap station. The station has an official station code of TE29. When the TEL extends to Sungei Bedok station, the subsequent station will be Bedok South. As part of the TEL, the station is operated by SMRT Trains. Situated along Bayshore Road, the station is near Calvary Assembly of God Church, Econ Medicare Centre & Nursing Home, Holy Grace Presbyterian Church and Singapore Hokkien Huay Kuan Cultural Academy. In addition to existing condominiums in the area such as The Summit, Bayshore Park, Costa Del Sol, Vela Bay and The Bayshore, the station will serve future housing developments in Bayshore, which includes public Housing and Development Board developments.

The station is a designated Civil Defence shelter. Bayshore station is one of the first MRT stations to have underground bicycle parking spaces. With 204 bike parking lots, the station also features bigger lifts connecting from ground level to the parking space, and specially designed stairs to allow people to wheel bicycles up and down the slopes. Designed by SAA Architects, each station entrance has a timber-inspired roof canopy with linear openings supported by outward-leaning columns, reminiscent of the raintrees lining the East Coast Parkway. Each entrance also has solar panels that powers lighting at street level. The station's interior features simplified layers of timber and screens, maintaining a cohesive design aesthetic. The station has an island platform configuration. Like the other TEL4 stations, hybrid cooling fans at the platform complement the station's air-conditioning to improve air circulation, yet lower energy consumption.

Farther Shores by Bruce Quek is displayed at this station as part of the Art-in-Transit programme, a showcase of public artworks on the MRT network. The artwork is a series of composite photos depicting present-day Bayshore incorporated with features from other places with similar names, giving a speculative outlook for commuters of how the Bayshore area would develop. Through the approach of placemaking, the artist hoped the work would broaden commuters' sense of identity in the past, present and future.
