= Tok Lasam =

Founder of Siglap, Singapore

Tok Lassam
- Penghulu
- Tomb of Tok Lassam, located off East Coast Road, Singapore.

Founder of Siglap
- Reign: c. 1821–1871
- Born: Pagaruyung, Sumatra
- Died: 1871; Colonial Singapore
- Burial: Jalan Sempadan, Siglap
- Spouse: Nyai Lassam
- House: Pagaruyung kingdom
- Religion: Sunni Islam

Abdul Lassam (d. 1871) more notably known by his title Tok Lassam, was a 19th-century village chieftain who lived in colonial Singapore. During his lifetime, he founded the settlement of Siglap in the south of Bedok. The preserved tomb of Tok Lassam can be found off East Coast Road.

== Biography ==
Abdul Lassam was a prominent village chieftain, although most of his lifetime was shrouded in legendary tales about him, such as claims that he founded Siglap in the 17th century before colonial rule. Originally a nobleman of royal lineage from the Pagaruyung kingdom, he formerly went by the given name Raja Sufian. Locals and villagers knew him as Tok Lassam, a name which would become commonplace in the historical record. Accompanied by a group of his followers, he sailed to Singapore and arrived on the coast of Bedok in the early 19th century contemporary to Sultan Hussein Shah and Sir Stamford Raffles, where he founded a predominately Islamic settlement that was named Siglap due to the darkness in the area. Local legend states that the immigration party arrived in 1821 when an eclipse was occurring, which led Tok Lassam to declare that the settlement would be named Si-Gelap (Malay for "The Dark One"). Not long after his founding of the village, he also built a mosque in Siglap, which was known as Masjid Kampung Siglap.

As a chieftain of the newly-established Siglap, Tok Lassam gained prominence amongst the British authorities after he was able to defeat a band of pirates that were terrorizing the eastern coasts of Singapore. He was also able to apprehend a spree killer that had ran amok in Bedok after escaping police custody. Later in 1860, Tok Lassam expanded the borders of Siglap, buying at least 3,363 sqm of land, which was later sold to a person by the name of Inche Draou in 1867.

Tok Lassam died in 1871 and placed two hundred dollars worth of property under the jurisdiction of the Supreme Court. He was buried in an Islamic cemetery in his village next to his wife. After his death, he left behind four children as his next-of-kin. His grave was also revered as a keramat and venerated by locals.

== Legacy ==
=== Tomb ===
The tomb of Tok Lassam and his wife can be found at the end of Jalan Sempadan, a short road which branches off from East Coast Road. The cemetery around the graves had been exhumed in 1993 while the graves themselves had been preserved due to petitioning from local community leaders. A wooden shrine also stood around them under 1990 when a collapsing tree crushed the shrine. In 2021, the tomb was renovated and a concrete enclosure was built around the tomb. A few metres away can be found the tomb of a man believed to be Tok Lassam's lieutenant.

=== Possessions ===
The surviving possessions of Tok Lassam, which are a dagger and a manuscript of the Mawlid al-Barzanji, are held in the private collection of his living descendants.

== See also ==
- Radin Mas Ayu
- Parameswara of Malacca
