= Bay Shore Methodist Episcopal Church =

Historic church in New York, United States

- U.S. National Register of Historic Places
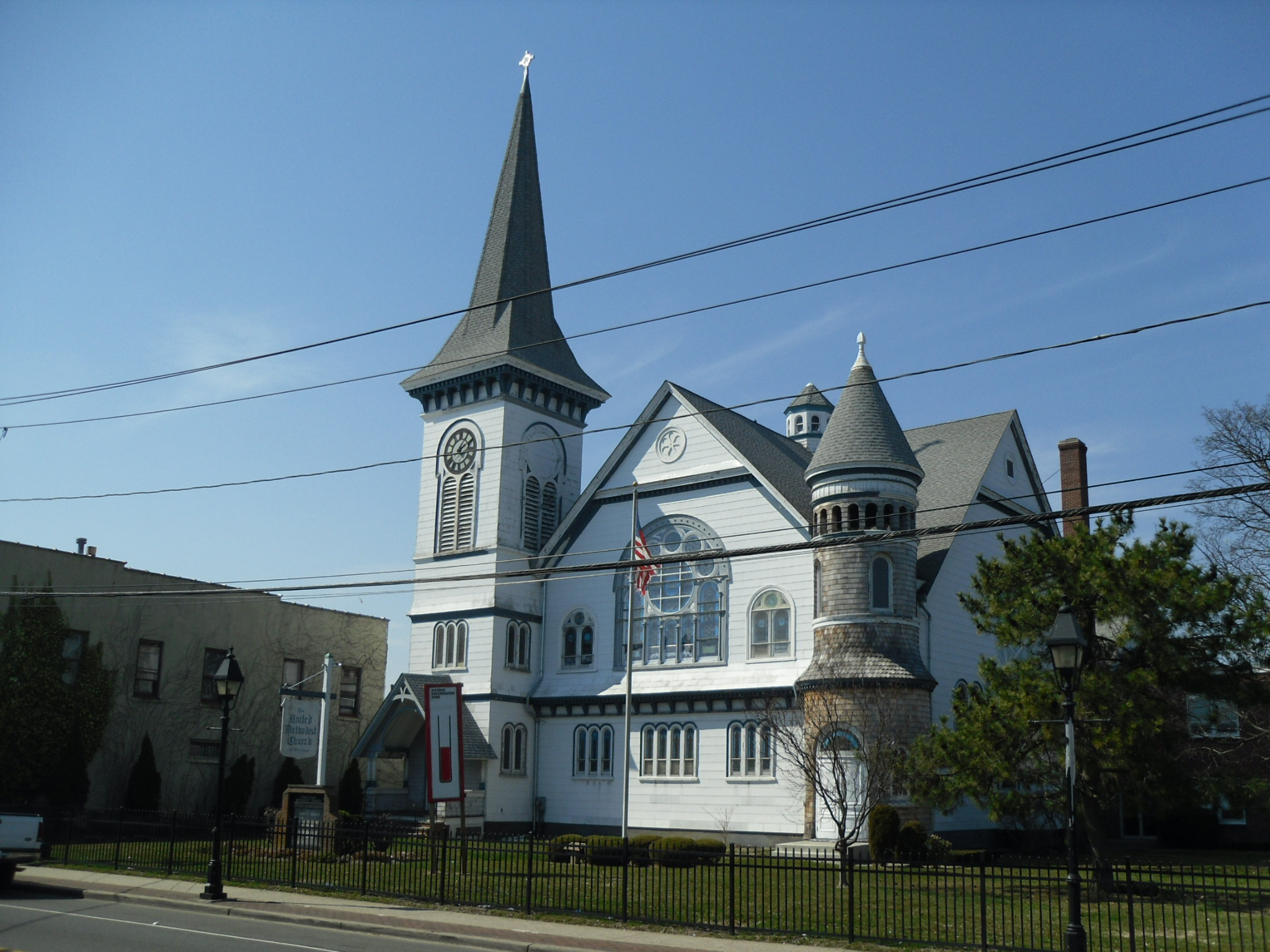
- Bay Shore Methodist Episcopal Church, March 2010

- Location within New York Location within the United States
- Location: E. Main St., jct. Second Ave., Bay Shore, New York
- Coordinates: 40°43′24″N 73°14′45″W
- Area: less than one acre
- Built: 1867
- Architectural style: Romanesque, Queen Anne, Gothic
- NRHP reference No.: 01000847
- Added to NRHP: August 15, 2001

Bay Shore Methodist Episcopal Church, also known as the United Methodist Church of Bay Shore, is a historic Methodist Episcopal church complex at E. Main Street at the junction of Second Avenue in Bay Shore, Suffolk County, New York. The complex consists of three attached units: the 1893 Richardsonian Romanesque-style church; the Gothic Revival style former church building built in 1867, relocated and now attached to the main church as the "Fellowship Hall," and a two-story, flat roofed Sunday School wing built in 1959.

It was added to the National Register of Historic Places in 2001.
