= Bay Shore Hose Company No. 1 Firehouse =

- U.S. National Register of Historic Places
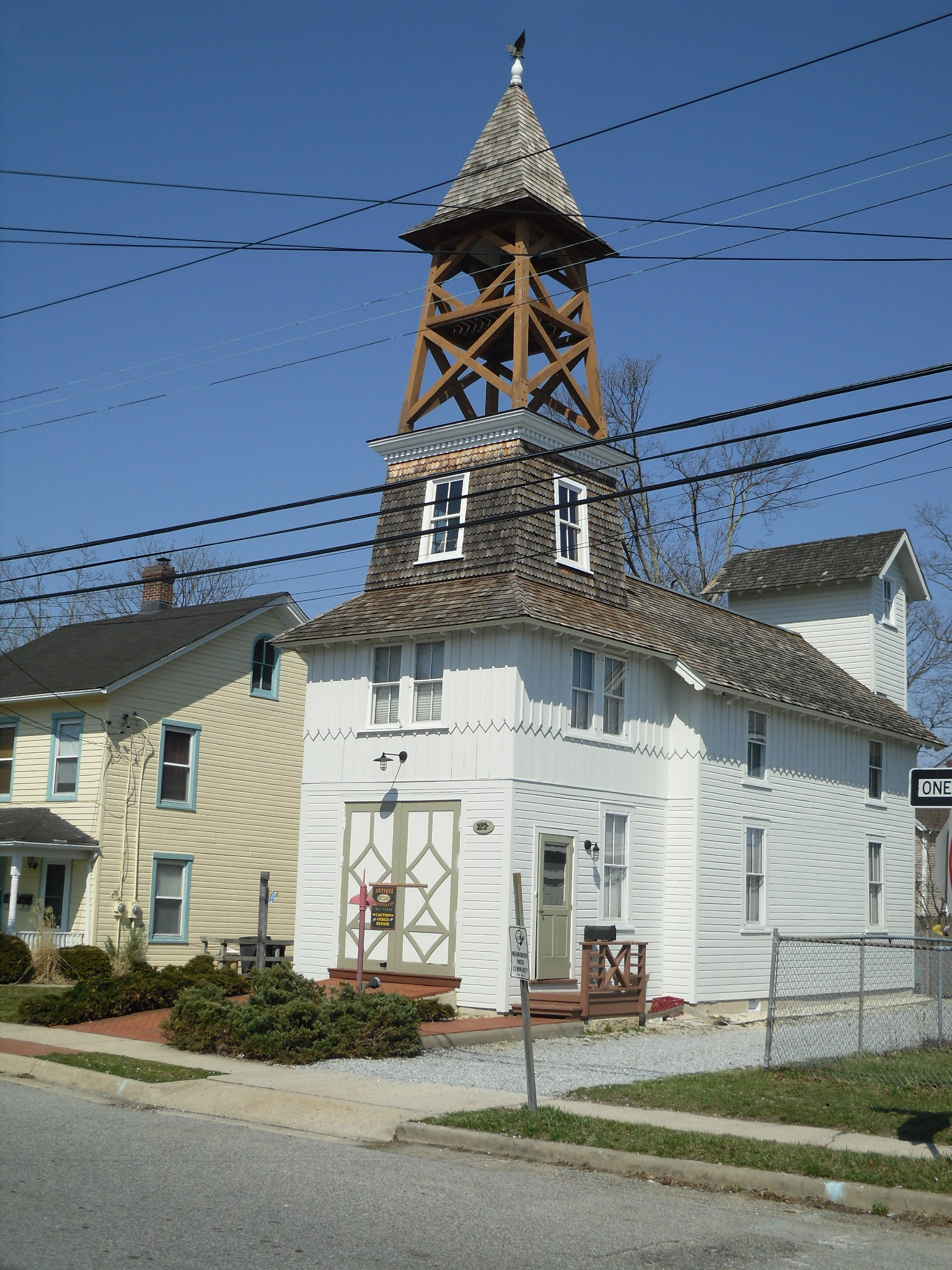
- Bay Shore Hose Company No. 1 Firehouse, March 2010

- Location within New York Location within the United States
- Location: Second Ave., Bay Shore, New York
- Coordinates: 40°43′29″N 73°14′46″W
- Area: less than one acre
- Built: 1887
- Architectural style: Stick/Eastlake
- NRHP reference No.: 01000851
- Added to NRHP: August 15, 2001

Bay Shore Hose Company No. 1 Firehouse, also known as Second Avenue Fire House, is a historic fire station located at Bay Shore in Suffolk County, New York. It was built in 1886 or 1887 and is a 1 1/2-story, wood-frame structure with a prominent bell tower. It features a slender hose-drying tower at the rear. Throughout its history it has been used as a fire station, synagogue, and boarding house. Today, it survives as an art gallery.

It was added to the National Register of Historic Places in 2001.
