= Bukit Chagar RTS station =

Integrated transit station in Johor Bahru, Johor, Malaysia

Coordinates: 1.466507°N 103.762283°E

Bukit Chagar 武吉查卡 புக்கிட் சகார்
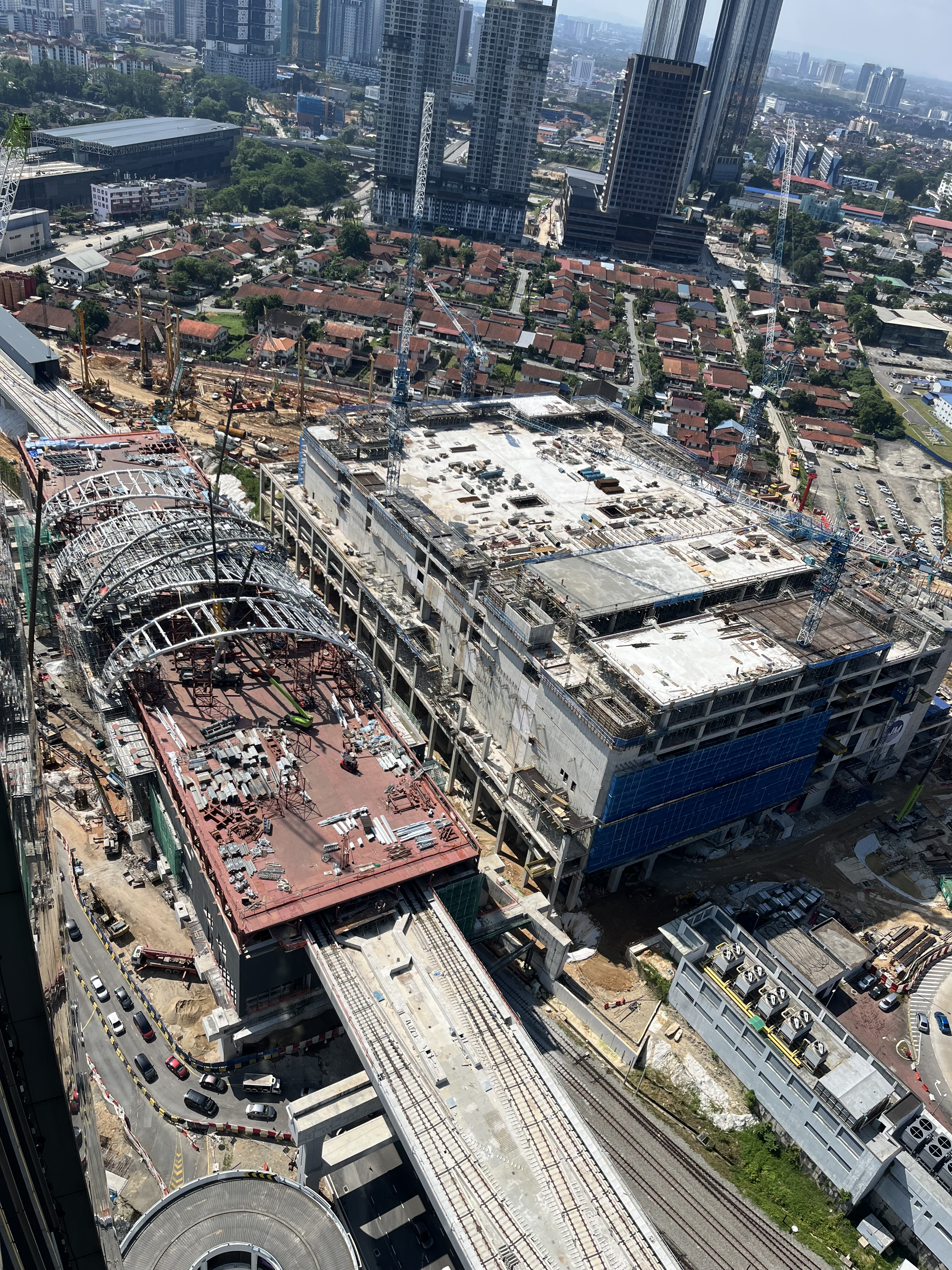
- Bukit Chagar station and CIQ building, with Wadi Hana Depot in the foreground. 6 July 2025

General information
- Location: Jalan Tun Abdul Razak; Bukit Chagar, 80300, Johor Bahru; Johor; Malaysia
- System: Rapid transit station
- Owner: Prasarana Malaysia
- Operator: RTS Operations Pte Ltd
- Line: RTS Link
- Platforms: 4 (2 side, 1 island)
- Tracks: 2 standard-gauge rail tracks
- Connections: ETS 1 JB Sentral

Construction
- Parking: Available

Other information
- Station code: BUC

History
- Opening: February 2027; 4 months' time

Services
| Preceding station | RTS Link | Following station |
|---|---|---|
| Terminus | Johor Bahru–Singapore Link | Woodlands North Terminus |
Track layout
Location

Bukit Chagar station is a rapid transit interchange station on the upcoming Johor Bahru–Singapore RTS Link, situated in Johor Bahru, Malaysia. The station derives its name from the nearby Bukit Chagar neighbourhood, located to its south. It is one of only two stations along the RTS Link, the counterpart being Woodlands North station in Singapore.

Bukit Chagar station will mark a significant milestone as the first Malaysian rapid transit station outside the Klang Valley. In tandem with its inauguration, an autonomous rail rapid transit (ART) system is also planned to be integrated with the station, enhancing last-mile connectivity within Johor Bahru's urban transport infrastructure.

The station will be connected to Komtar JBCC shopping mall via a 450 m (1,480 ft) long elevated linkway. Another linkway, costing RM60 million, is under construction to provide a shorter walk to JB Sentral, providing access to KTM ETS, Intercity and Komuter train services, as well as public bus services. The station was designed by Johor-based SM Architects.

Construction of the station was completed by 18 August 2026, with a visit to the station by Transport Minister Anthony Loke to mark the event. The station will begin operation in February 2027.
