= Johor Bahru–Singapore Rapid Transit System =

Cross-border rapid transit system

Johor Bahru–Singapore RTS Link
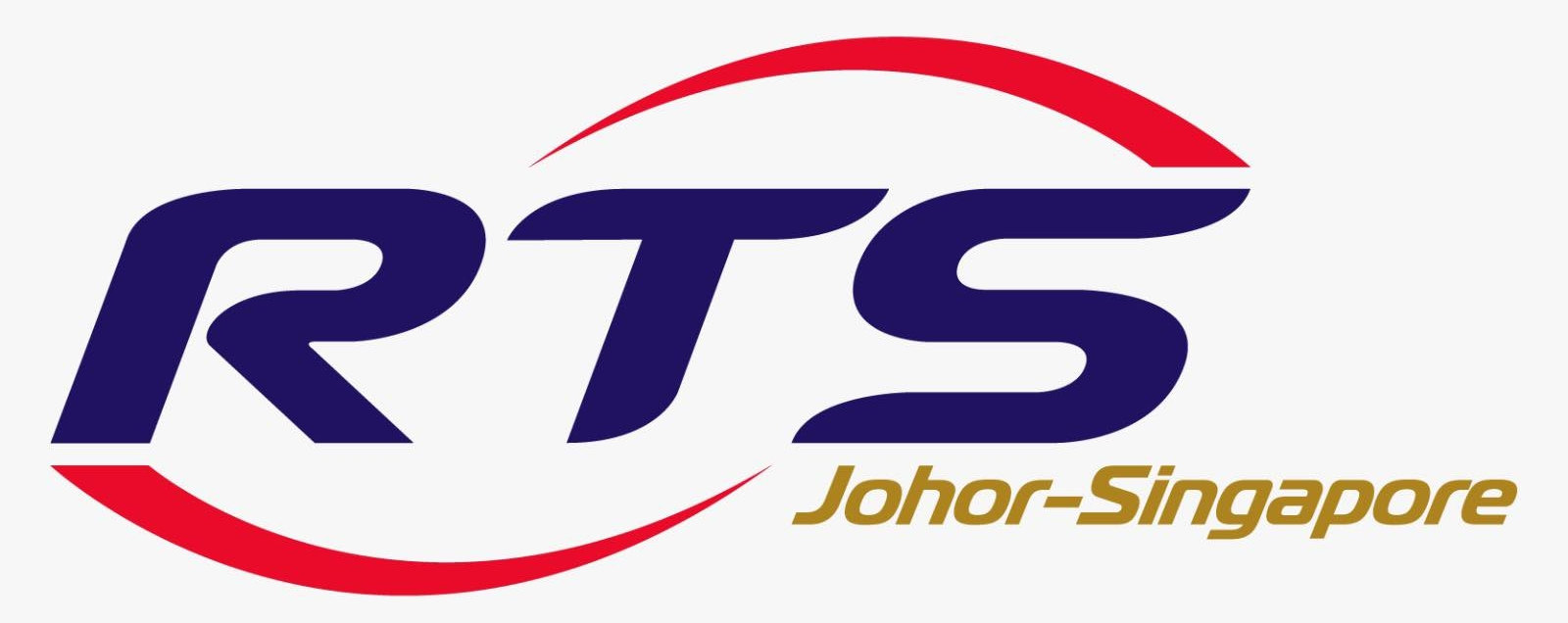

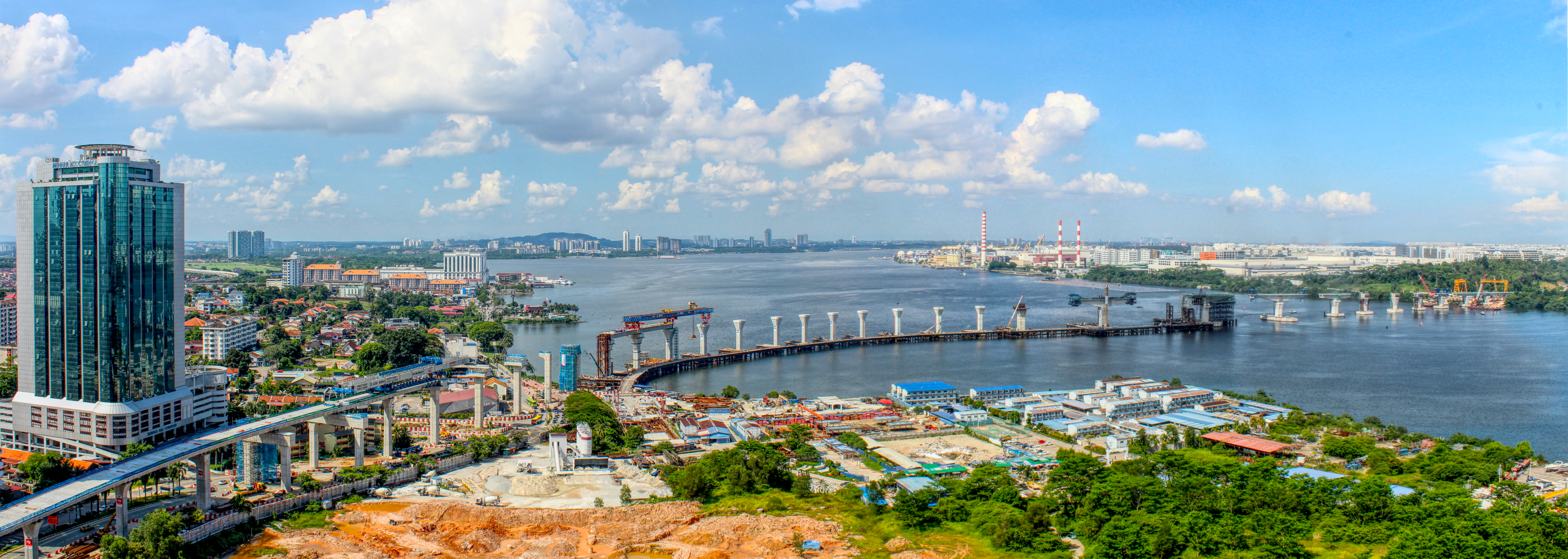
- Connecting viaducts in the Johor Strait under construction in May 2024

Overview
- Native name: Sistem Transit Aliran Johor Bahru–Singapura (Malay) 新柔捷运系统 (Chinese) ஜொகூர் பாரு-சிங்கப்பூர் விரைவுப் போக்குவரத்து அமைப்பு (Tamil)
- Status: Under construction; 90% completed
- Owner: InfraCo Malaysia; InfraCo Singapore
- Locale: Johor Bahru, Johor, Malaysia; Woodlands, North Region, Singapore
- Termini: Bukit Chagar RTS station; Woodlands North MRT/RTS station
- Stations: 2
- Website: rts-link.com

Service
- Type: Cross-border rapid transit
- System: Rapid transit
- Services: 1
- Operator(s): RTS Operations Pte Ltd (Prasarana–SMRT Corporation joint venture (JV); 30 years concession period
- Depot(s): Wadi Hana, Johor Bahru
- Rolling stock: CRRC Zhuzhou LRV – 8 four-car trainsets Car length: 19.22 m (63 ft 3/4 in) (Front/End); 18.80 m (61 ft 8 1/8 in) (Middle); Width: 2.70 m (8 ft 10 in) – narrow profile Length: 76.04 m (249.5 ft); Doors: 6 per car, 3 per side

History
- Planned opening: February 2027; 3 months' time

Technical
- Line length: 4.0 km (2.5 mi) of which • 2.3 km (1.4 mi) is in Malaysia • 1.7 km (1.1 mi) is in Singapore
- Num of tracks: 2
- Character: Elevated & underground
- Track gauge: 1,435 mm (4 ft 8 1/2 in) standard gauge
- Operating speed: 80 km/h (50 mph)

The Johor Bahru–Singapore Rapid Transit System (RTS) Link is an upcoming 4 km (2.5 mi) long, twin-track rapid transit system crossing the Strait of Johor between Malaysia and Singapore. It will link Johor Bahru, Malaysia, at Bukit Chagar station, with the Singapore MRT at Woodlands North station in Woodlands. Operations are targeted to begin in February 2027. It is expected to serve 40,000 passengers daily at launch, with long-term plans to serve about 140,000 daily.

Both of the line's stations will house customs, immigration and quarantine (CIQ) facilities for both countries, independent from the existing CIQs at the Sultan Iskandar Building and Woodlands Checkpoint. When completed, the RTS Link is expected to replace the KTM Shuttle Tebrau service between JB Sentral and Woodlands Train Checkpoint stations by June 2027. On the Johor side, it is Malaysia's first LRT system outside the Klang Valley, and is expected to be part of a planned comprehensive integrated network.

== Background ==
=== Planning and development ===
A proposed extension of the Singapore Mass Rapid Transit (MRT) system to Johor Bahru was first discussed between Singapore's prime minister Lee Kuan Yew and Malaysia's counterpart Mahathir Mohamad in 1990. On 15 July that year, the Johor Menteri Besar Muhyiddin Yassin said he "welcomed" the project, but the Malaysian federal government would have to study and evaluate the proposal.

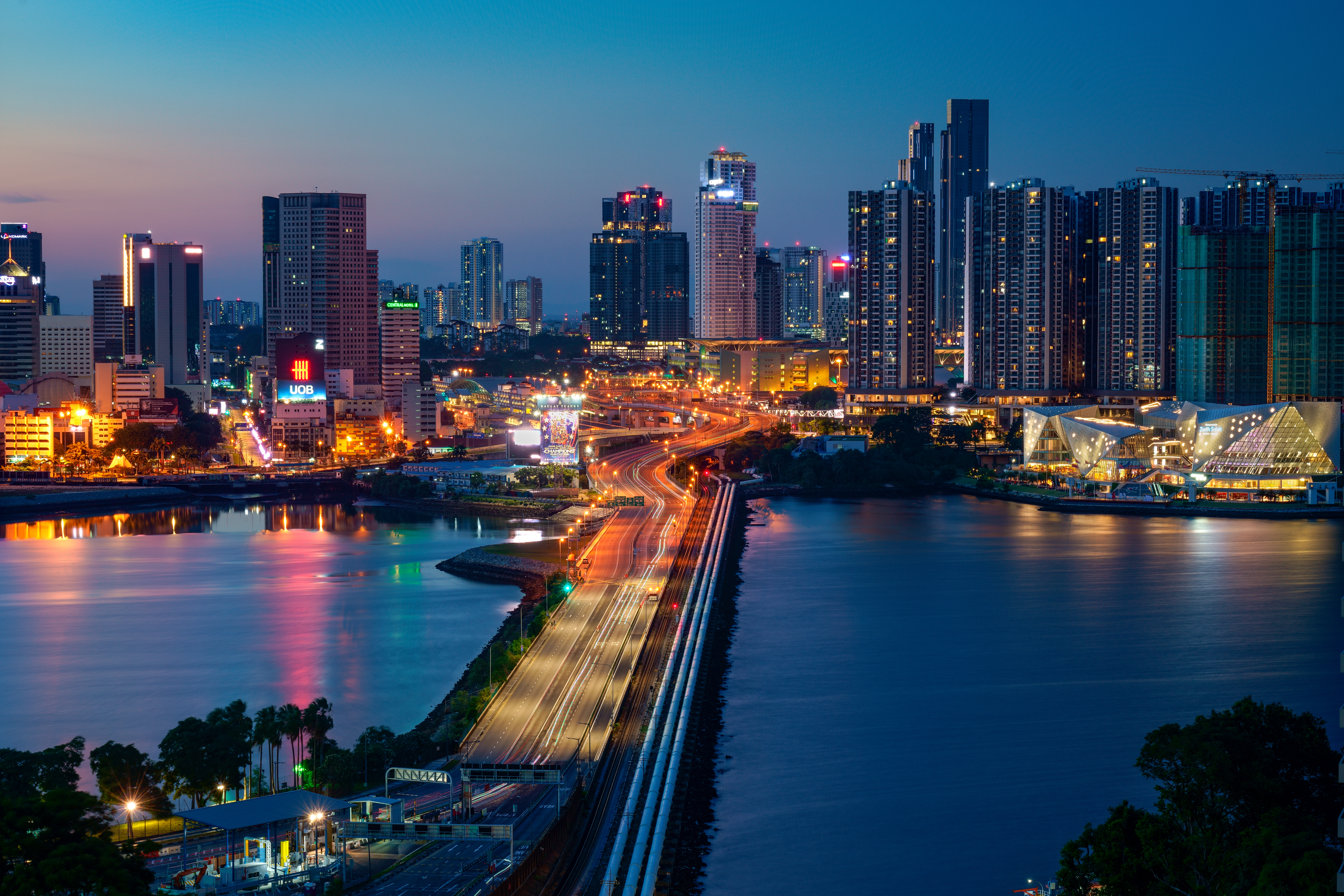
Johor–Singapore Causeway

The cross-border project was aimed to address traffic congestion on the Johor–Singapore Causeway while boosting tourism in Johor. However, taxi operators in Johor expressed concerns of the project's impact on their earnings. Although the Johor government intended to commission a study on the MRT project's social and economic impact, the project implementation was delayed due to a lack of funds.

In December 1990, Muhyiddin suggested to deputy prime minister Goh Chok Tong that the Singapore MRT could be extended to Johor Bahru as part of the Woodlands extension, saying that such an extension could capitalise on the potential ridership in Johor. Muhyiddin also proposed that a light rail line could be built instead, which would connect with the MRT line in Woodlands. Following the announcement of the Woodlands extension in February 1991, Singapore's communications minister Mah Bow Tan said the cross-border link was "very much on the cards", with provisions at Woodlands station reserved for the extension. Nevertheless, further feasibility studies would need to be carried out with the Malaysian government.

The rapid transit system was then revisited two decades later and proposed during the Singapore-Malaysia Leaders' Retreat on 24 May 2010. The RTS would link Tanjong Puteri in Johor Bahru and Woodlands in Singapore, aiming to ease traffic congestion on the Johor–Singapore Causeway and enhance connectivity between the two countries. It was targeted to be operational by 2018.

=== Concrete steps ===
In June 2011, Singapore proposed a cross border rail link connected to the northern terminus of the upcoming Thomson Line. A tender was called in November later that year to conduct design and engineering studies on the RTS link, which aimed to determine the technical parameters and options for the alignment and proposals for the system. A consortium of Aecom Perunding, Aecom Singapore and SA Architects subsequently won the tender. The first part of the preliminary engineering study was completed in March 2014.

On 15 September 2015, the Johor Public Works, Rural and Regional Development Committee selected Bukit Chagar as its terminus after a public vote, over Tanjong Puteri, JB Sentral 1 and JB Sentral 2. It was also confirmed that the terminus would have operate its own customs and immigration clearance facilities, separate from the existing facilities at Sultan Iskandar Building. Its chairman Hasni Mohammad stated that Singapore had given no indication of the final alignment of the link from a total of three options. This drew a response from Singapore's Ministry of Transport which replied that they were unable to finalise the alignment of the crossing as there was no confirmation of the location of Malaysia's terminus.

On 13 December 2016, the countries' prime ministers confirmed a high-bridge crossing for the RTS to cross the Strait of Johor. The link would be operated by a corporate entity and fares market-based and set by the operator. The following year, in July 2017, it was stated that the line would begin operations on 31 December 2024 and that a jointly run-operating company would run and maintain the RTS operating systems, including its trains, tracks and signalling system. Each government would also appoint an infrastructure company to fund, build, own, maintain and upgrade the civil infrastructure and stations in their own countries. Daily shuttle train service from Woodlands Train Checkpoint to Johor Bahru would also cease operating after the RTS Link opens.

In August 2017, the Sultan of Johor Ibrahim Ismail expressed serious reservations on the proposed design of the rail track, citing that the overall curve-shaped design and height would disrupt the city skyline along the Johor Straits. He also questioned the need for both countries to engage separate contractors to build portions of the link in their respective countries and the involvement of Prasarana Malaysia in the joint operating company with SMRT Corporation instead of the Johor state government. As such, he wanted the overall plan to be reviewed to ensure that it would be "logical, economical and sustainable".

A memorandum of understanding between SMRT Corporation and Prasarana Malaysia was signed in September 2017 to form a joint venture company to operate the link. Details such as control of the operating company were yet to be worked out. On 16 January 2018, Singapore and Malaysia signed a bilateral agreement on the project finalizing certain aspects of the project, including its maintenance facilities, operator, and customs facilities.

=== Delay and suspension by Malaysia ===
Following the 2018 Malaysian general election which resulted in a change of government, Malaysia's transport minister Loke Siew Fook mentioned in May 2018 that it sought to reduce the cost of the project amidst efforts to reduce the Malaysian national debt. However, in mid-July 2018, Singapore's transport minister Khaw Boon Wan said in Parliament that it had not received any official communication from the new Malaysian government despite Loke's comments. A joint operating company between Singapore's SMRT Corporation and Malaysia's Prasarana Malaysia that was supposed to be incorporated by 30 June 2018 failed to materialise as discussions were suspended.

In July 2018, Malaysia's Loke expressed hope for the project's continuation and that the Malaysian cabinet had given in-principle approval to the project but was still looking into the cost and other details. He also mentioned that the issue of compensation did not apply as the joint operating company was not set up yet. A working paper on the project was to be presented to the cabinet the joint operating company set up upon its approval. Despite the delay, he said that the project would still be completed on time by 2024.

On 14 January 2019, Singapore's Khaw confirmed that the project was not progressing well, with Malaysia missing deadlines that were set in the bilateral meeting in 2018. Deadlines were extended as soon as they were negotiable – the first until September 2018, then December 2018, then February 2019. On 8 April 2019, the two transport ministers stated that both sides were working towards a "supplemental agreement" to temporarily suspend the project for 6 months, allowing Malaysia to review "key parameters" of the project. The suspension would be approached in the same way as was done for the suspension of the Kuala Lumpur–Singapore high speed rail. On 21 May, the project was suspended for six months until 30 September, with Malaysia compensating Singapore more than $600,000 of abortive costs incurred. On 28 September, Malaysia further extended the suspension to 31 October, which Singapore acceded to without claiming compensation, but reserving its right to do so after the date.

On 11 October 2019, Malaysia announced in its budget that it would proceed with the project with Singapore, although with significant financial cuts. On 31 October, Malaysian prime minister Mahathir Mohamad announced a 36 percent cost cut from the original RM4.93 billion to RM3.16 billion. Some of the proposals included involving the developers/owners of the Bukit Chagar land to waive land costs and using a light rail system similar to the Ampang LRT line instead of the heavy rail Thomson–East Coast Line's system to reduce costs. In the aftermath of the 2020 Malaysian political crisis, a second change of government resulted in Muhyiddin Yassin becoming prime minister in March 2020. On 2 May, due to the COVID-19 pandemic, it was agreed to suspend the project further until 31 July 2020. Discussions with the new government continued ahead of a final deadline on 31 July.

=== Resumption ===
On 21 July 2020, Malaysia's transport minister Wee Ka Siong stated that construction was due to begin in January 2021 with targeted completion in 2026. The planned depot in Mandai would also be relocated to Johor Bahru, with construction cost borne by Malaysia. On 30 July 2020, Singapore prime minister Lee Hsien Loong and Malaysia prime minister Muhyiddin Yassin attended the ceremony at the midway point of the Causeway that marked the resumption of the RTS project. The RTS Link is expected to replace the KTM Shuttle Tebrau service between JB Sentral and Woodlands Train Checkpoint stations by June 2027, although the Malaysian government has expressed its intention to temporarily maintain the KTM service. However, continuing the service ultimately depends on whether the Singaporean government agrees to the proposal.

== Construction ==
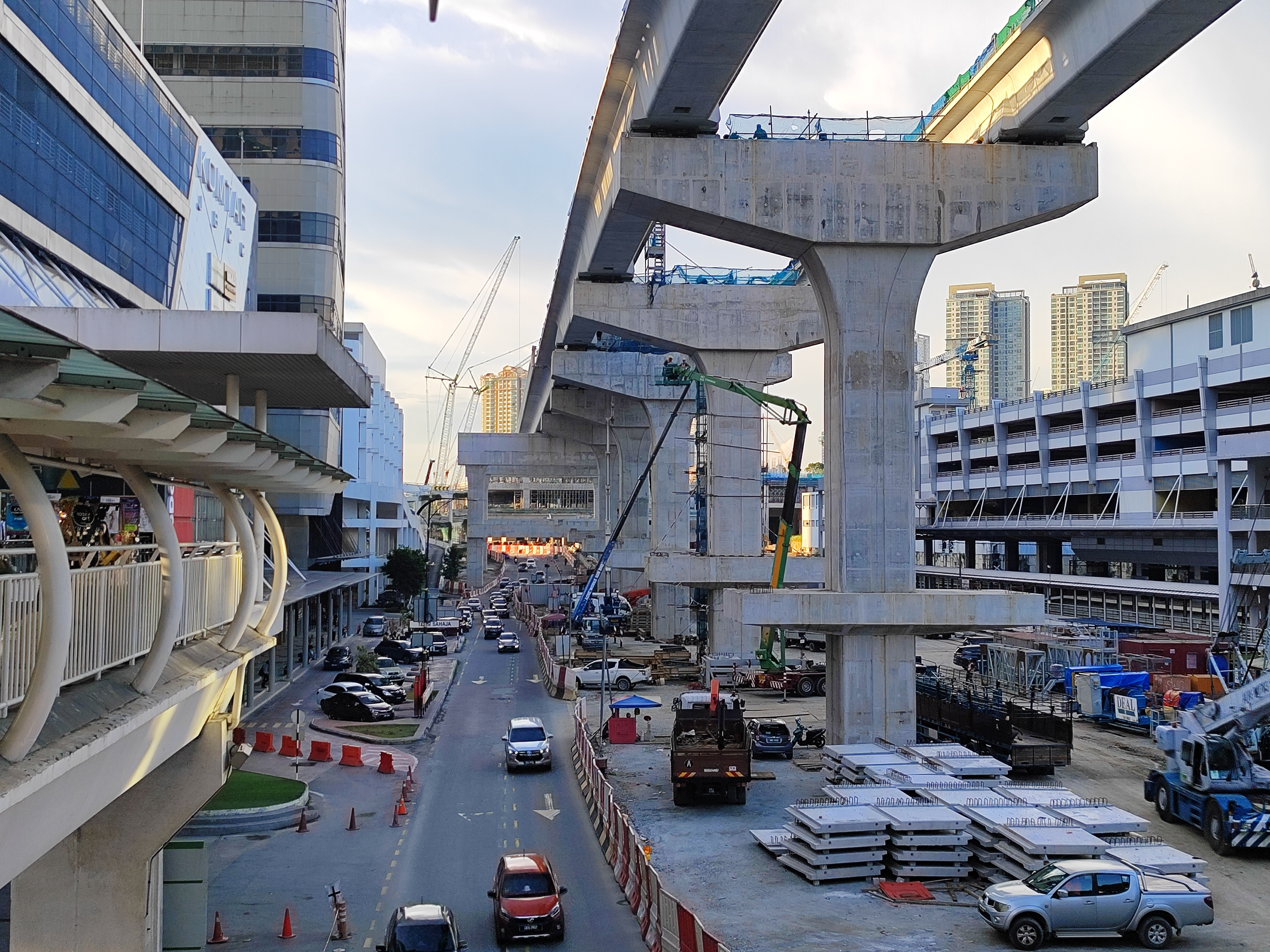
Construction near JB Sentral, 8 November 2024

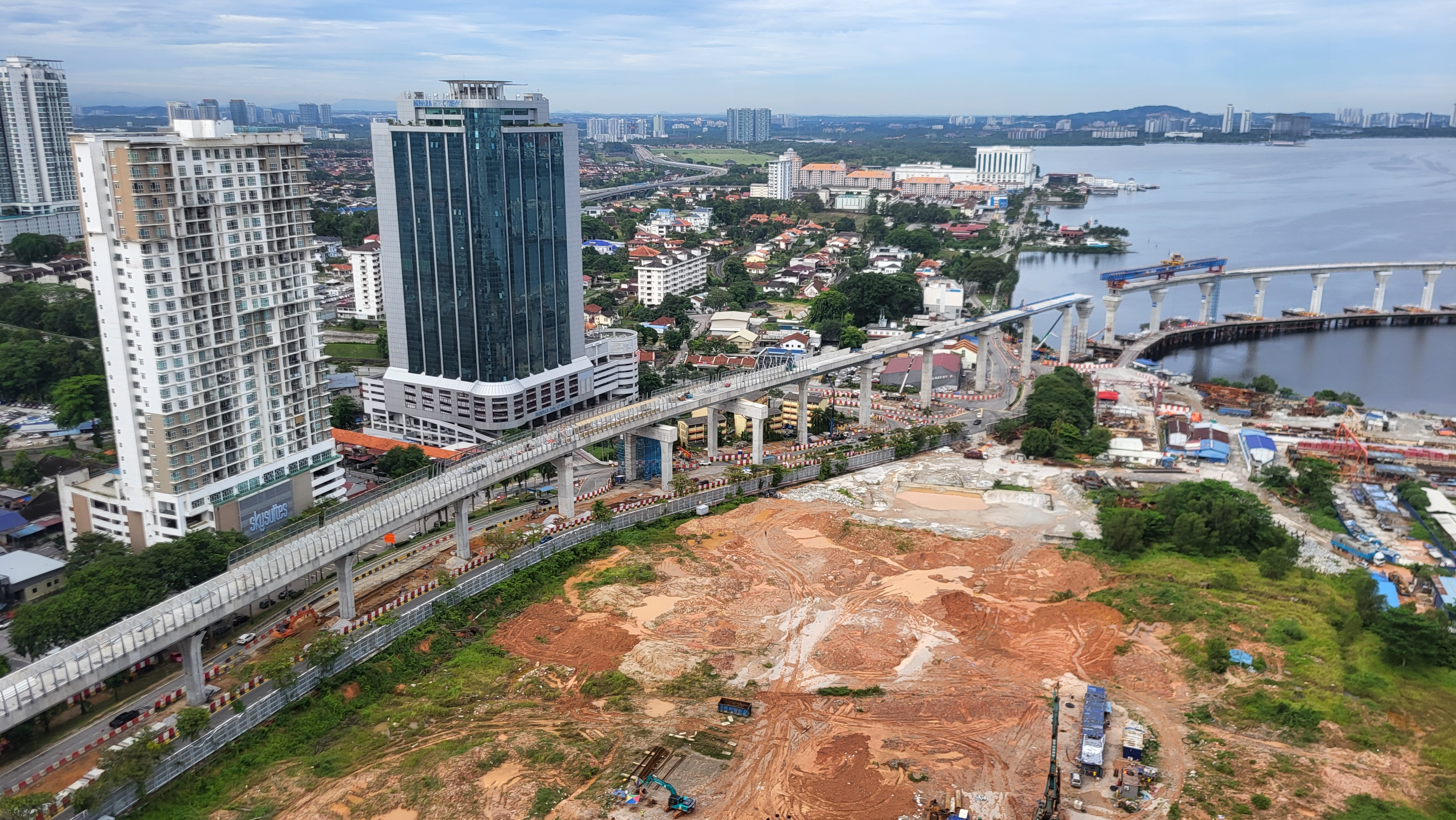
Construction on the Johor side, 26 September 2024.

Construction on the project began in Malaysia and Singapore on 22 November 2020 and 22 January 2021 respectively, and is planned to be completed by December 2026. Singapore's side of the project reached 45% completion by March 2023, and 50% by May that same year, with Malaysia being at 36% completion. Overall construction reached over 65% completion by January 2024, then up to 77.61% by June that year. By November 2025, it was reported that testing of the line will begin at the end of 2025, with completion of the project by the end of 2026, and opening "at the start of 2027". By April 2026, it was reported that 90% of construction was complete. In October 2026, the opening of the line was delayed to February 2027.

=== Bukit Chagar station ===
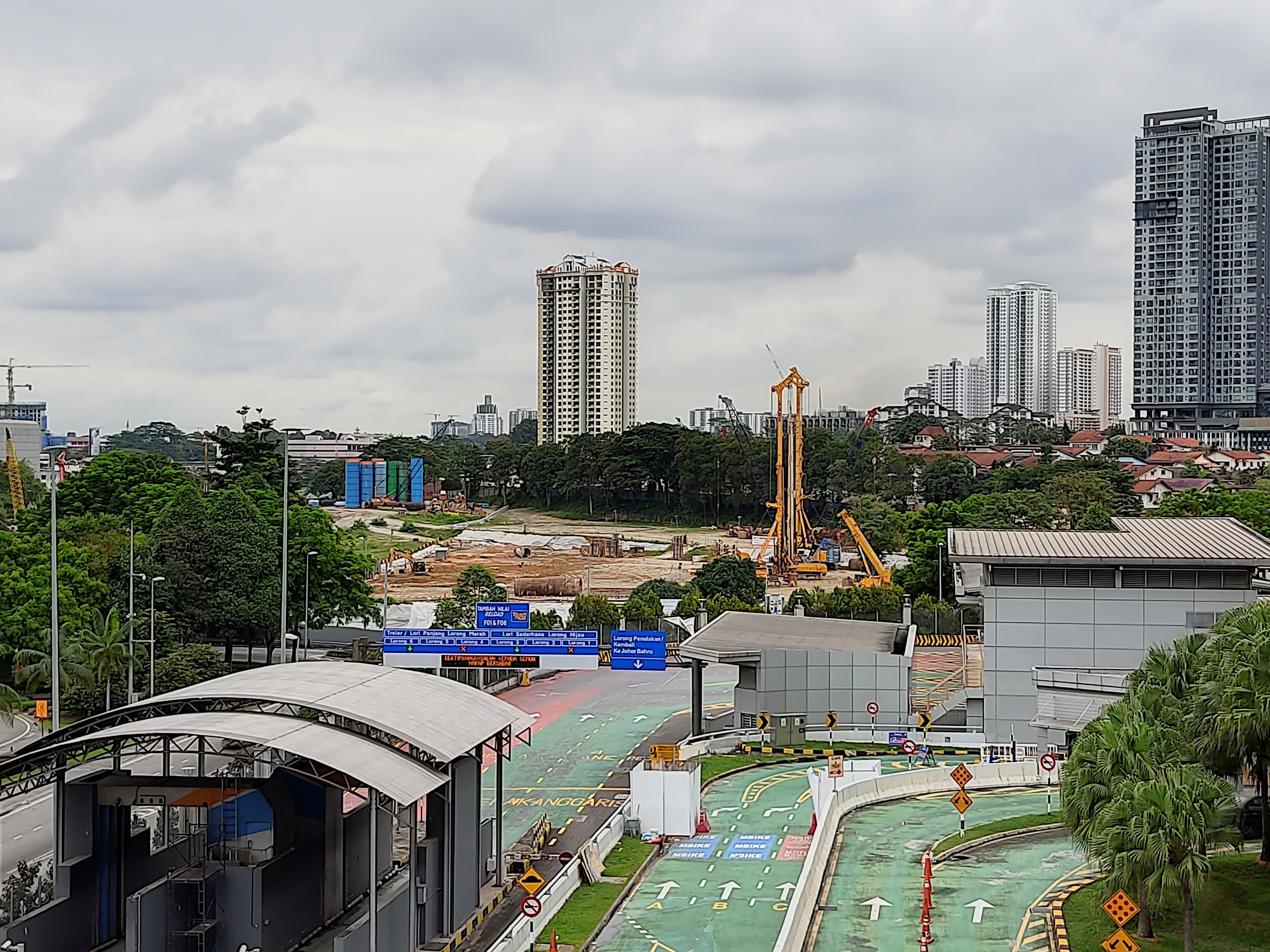
Bukit Chagar RTS construction site in May 2022

Construction of the Bukit Chagar station started on 22 November 2020 in an online groundbreaking ceremony owing to the COVID-19 pandemic. In the ceremony, it was announced that the four-storey station will be co-located within a transit-oriented development with a transport hub and property developments around the station. The station will be owned and developed by MRT Corp. In January 2024, it was reported that 40% of the station works, including piling works, were completed, with 65% completion overall for Malaysia's side. Upon completion, it will be Malaysia's first LRT station ever constructed outside the Klang Valley.

On 19 February 2021, the design of the station was unveiled after a design competition. The station will be co-located within a four-storey Customs, Immigration and Quarantine (CIQ) facility. The station's exterior has an intertwined roof that symbolises shared ties between the people of Malaysia and Singapore as well as the long history. The station will also have natural lighting to save energy, as well as self cleaning windows to reduce costs.

By April 2026, structural works for the station and CIQ facility were largely completed. Testing of the station's systems are scheduled to begin as early as September.

=== Woodlands North station ===
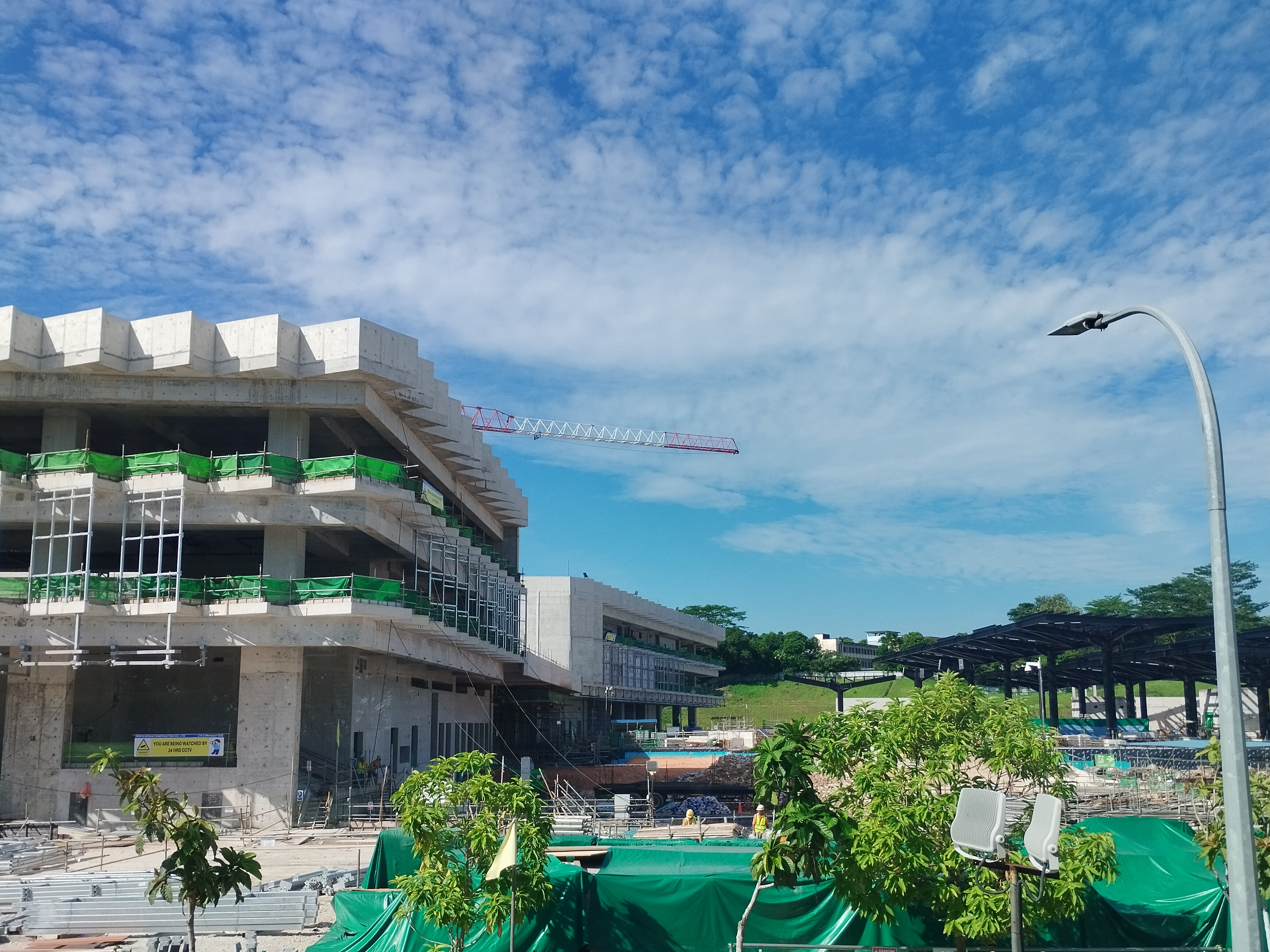
Woodlands North RTS construction site in June 2025

On 26 November 2020, the construction contract of Woodlands North RTS station in Singapore was awarded to Penta-Ocean Construction Co Ltd valued at S$932.8 million (US$675.94 million) by the Land Transport Authority (LTA). The contract also includes the construction of the tunnels and the Customs, Immigration, and Quarantine (CIQ) building. Its construction began on 22 January 2021 in a groundbreaking ceremony attended by Singapore's transport minister Ong Ye Kung. The second contract to construct tunnels and viaducts was awarded on 29 January 2021 by LTA to China Communications Construction Company Limited (Singapore branch) at a value of S$180 million (US$135.24 million). The station's structural work was completed in September 2026.

=== Marine viaduct ===
Construction progress of the marine viaduct

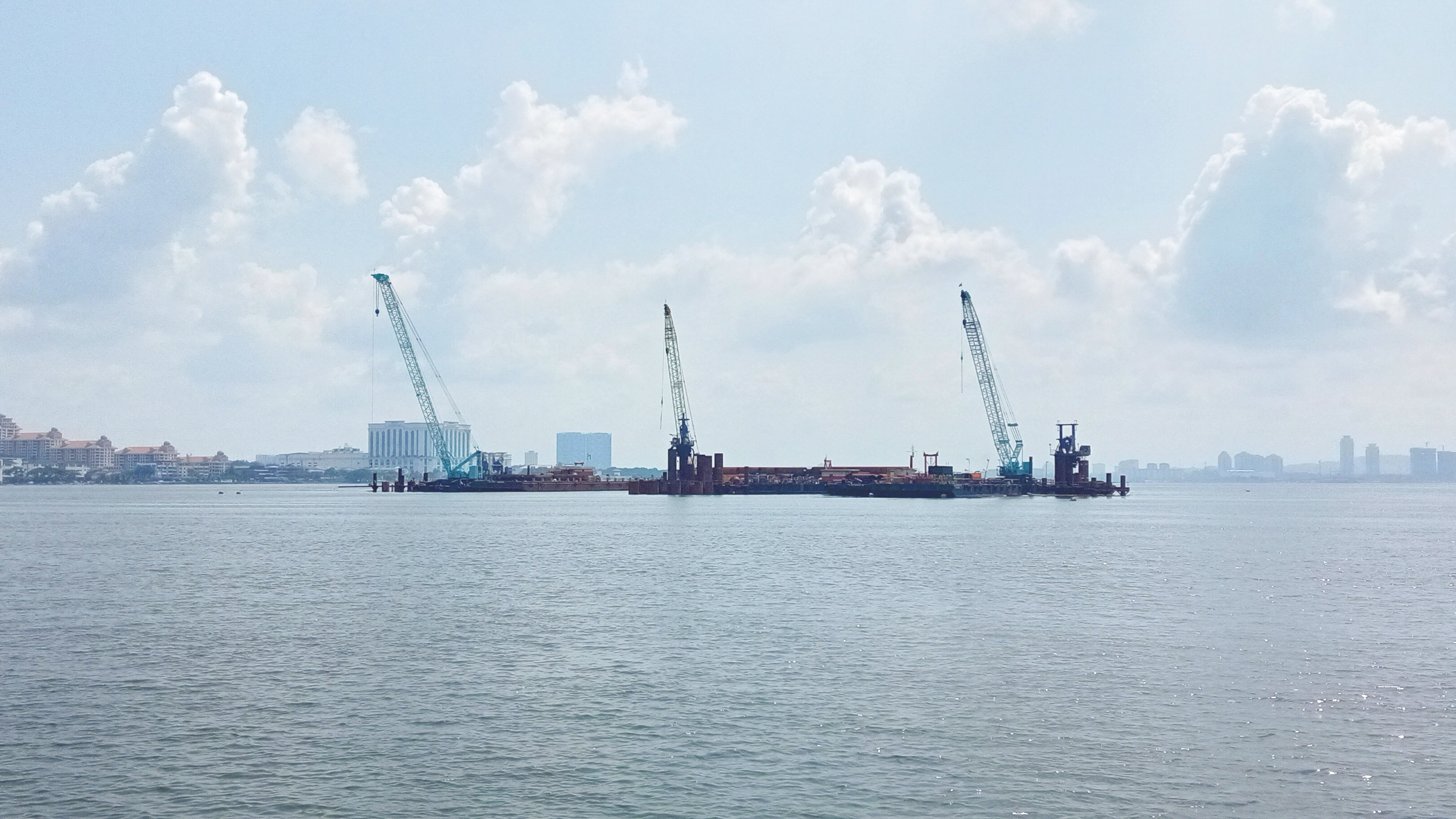
May 2022

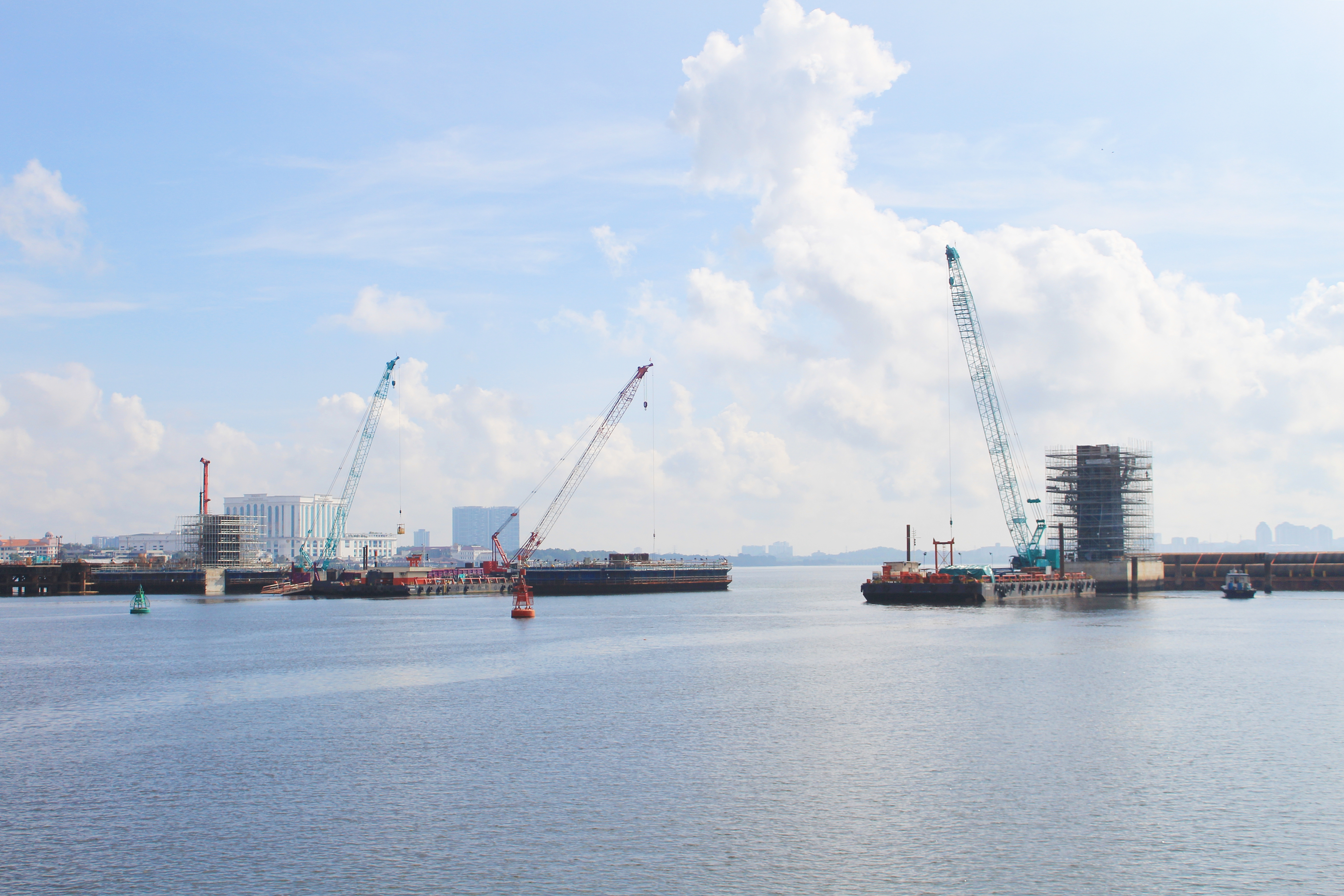
April 2023

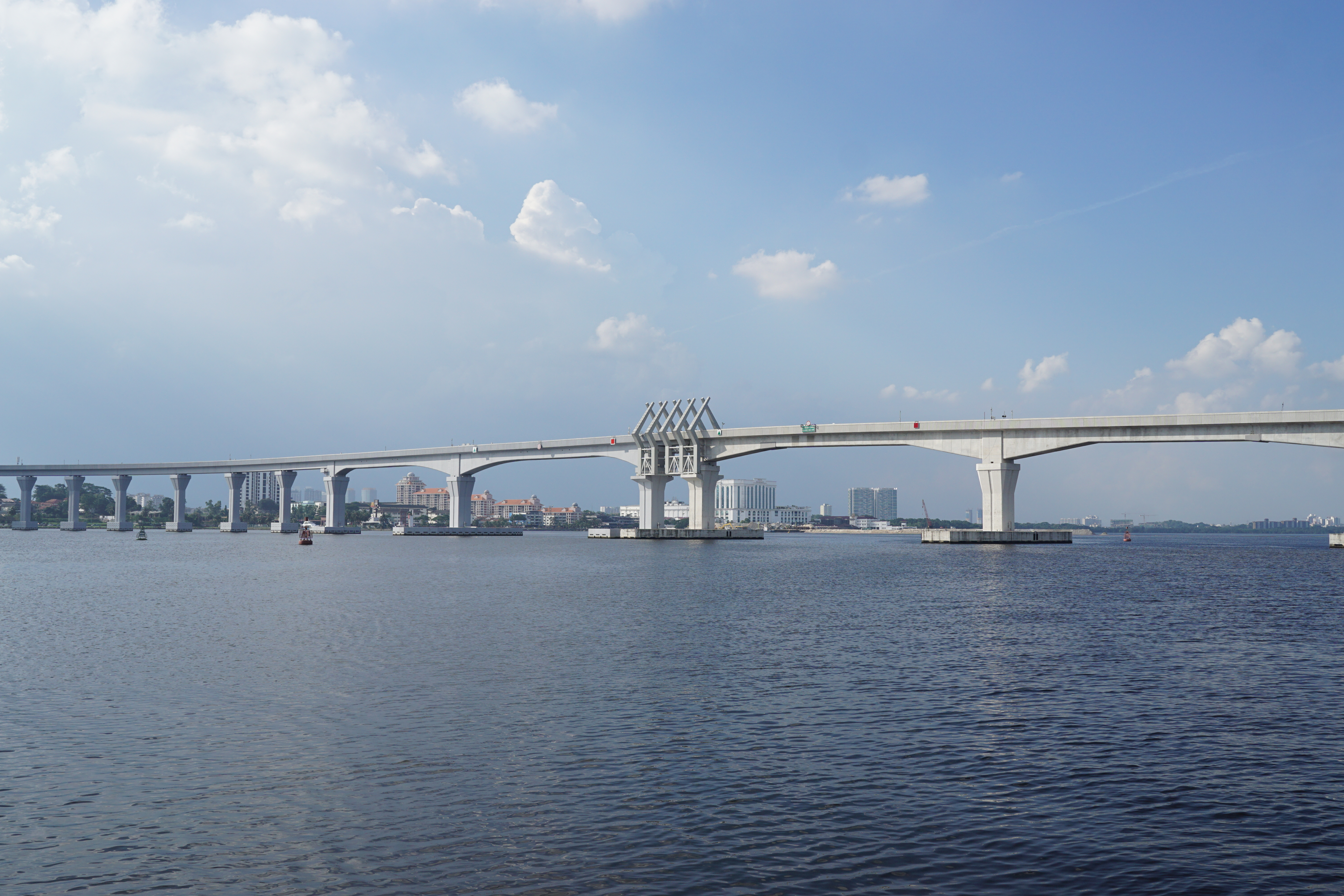
July 2026

On 13 October 2018, it was reported that Singapore's Land Transport Authority has called for tender for the construction of a 1.1 km (0.68 mi) tunnel and overhead bridge to Johor in end-September 2018. Construction was initially scheduled to begin in the middle of 2019.

A contract to build the marine viaduct was awarded in January 2021, with construction beginning soon after. In January 2024, prime ministers Lee Hsien Loong and Anwar Ibrahim met in the Johor Strait to mark the completion of the concrete span connecting the Singapore and Malaysian ends of a rail viaduct spanning across the strait. The twelve pile caps that would support Singapore's side of the viaduct were completed.

== Service ==
Route of the RTS

=== Route ===
The RTS spans 4 km (2.5 mi) and will run in a general north–south direction, connecting Bukit Chagar station in Malaysia and Woodlands North station in Singapore. The line will begin at Bukit Chagar station near JB Sentral and run along Jalan Tun Abdul Razak, before turning east before the Causeway and running along Jalan Ismail Sultan. After the junction with Jalan Lingkaran Dalam, the line turns south, crossing the Johor Strait on an elevated viaduct, before the line terminates next to Singapore's Woodlands North MRT station.

=== Service ===
Eight driverless four-car trains will run with a normal and maximum capacity per train of 607 and 1,087 passengers respectively. Services are to operate daily between 6 am and midnight, with speeds up to 80 km/h (50 mph). Journey time is expected to be five minutes with a 3.6 minute peak hour frequency. An estimated 10,000 passengers per hour in each direction is projected to reduce traffic on the existing Johor–Singapore Causeway border crossing by at least 35%.

=== Operator ===
The line will be operated by RTS Operations, a joint venture between Malaysian public transport company Prasarana Malaysia and Singaporean rail operator SMRT Corporation.

=== Fares ===
In July 2020, Malaysian transport minister Wee Ka Siong said fares for the line would be affordable, adding that fares would be the same on both sides of the Causeway after factoring in currency conversion, with the fare expressed as the same amount in Malaysian ringgit (MYR) and Singapore dollar (SGD), respectively. In January 2024, Malaysian transport minister Anthony Loke said fares would be "competitive", with the exact amount to be set by RTS Operations closer to the start of service. In February 2026, Loke said fares were expected to be around RM15.50 to RM21.70, or about S$5 to S$7, per journey. In April 2026, Singapore's Ministry of Transport said fares would be determined commercially by RTS Operations and announced in due course. Both countries are not expected to provide subsidies for commuters from the other country.

=== Immigration facilities ===
Each terminus will have co-located immigration facilities – commuters will clear both Singapore and Malaysia authorities at the departure point and not at the arrival point. This arrangement allows convenient passenger travel when crossing the border. This is similar to other railway lines that cross borders – such as at the Hong Kong West Kowloon railway station in Hong Kong, or St Pancras International railway station in the United Kingdom.

Both the Malaysian parliament and Singapore parliament passed bills to grant legal immunity to officials stationed at Bukit Chagar in Malaysia and Woodlands North in Singapore. These functions limiting them to custom, immigration and security functions, and are only exercisable within the designated areas of the station. Additionally, any individual detained by officials at a station must be transferred to the host country's authorities without undue delay. Officials can still be criminally prosecuted in the host country if they committed an offence in their personal capacity.

== Infrastructure ==
=== Rolling stock and signalling ===
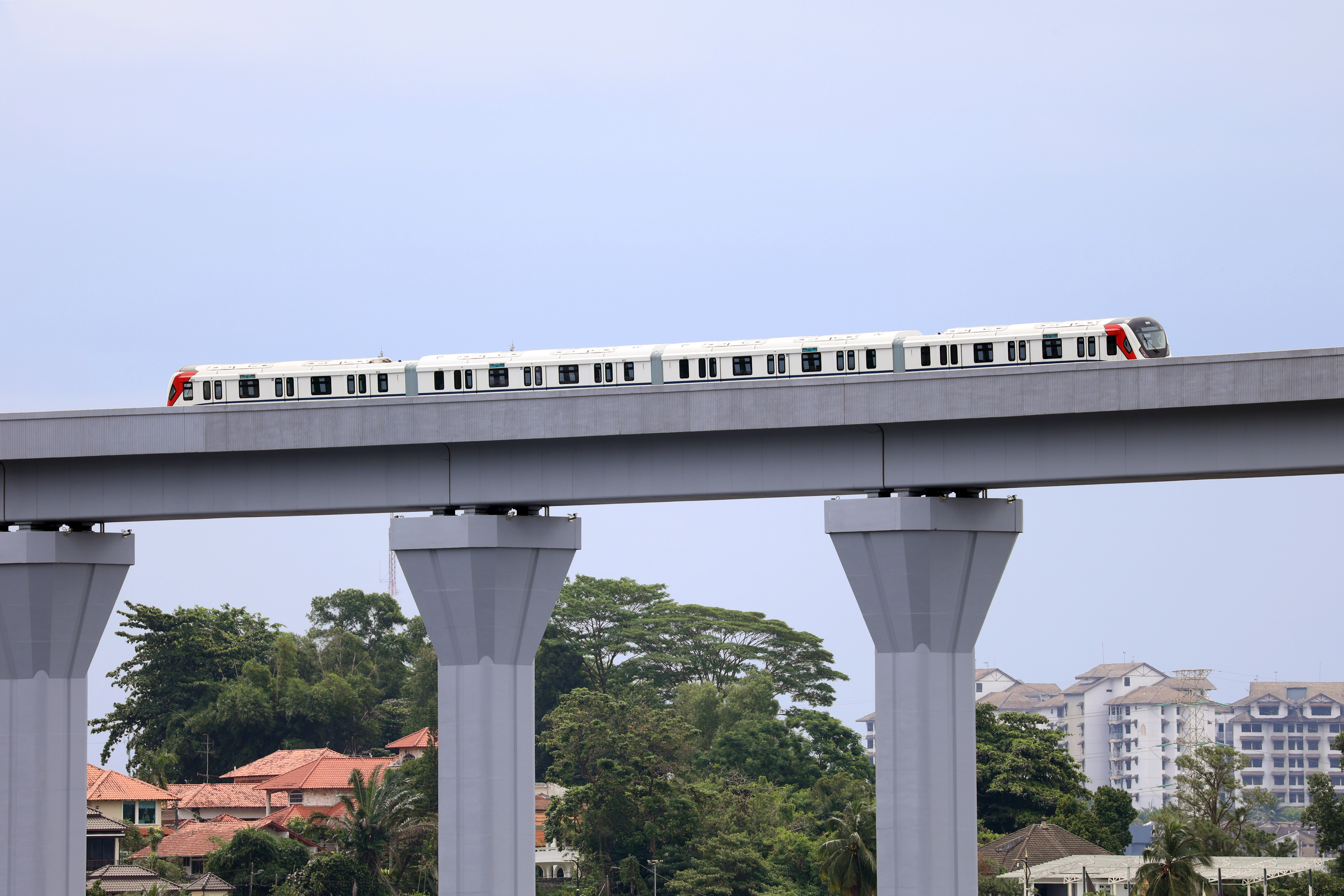
CRRC Zhuzhou Locomotive rolling stock on trial on 7 June 2026

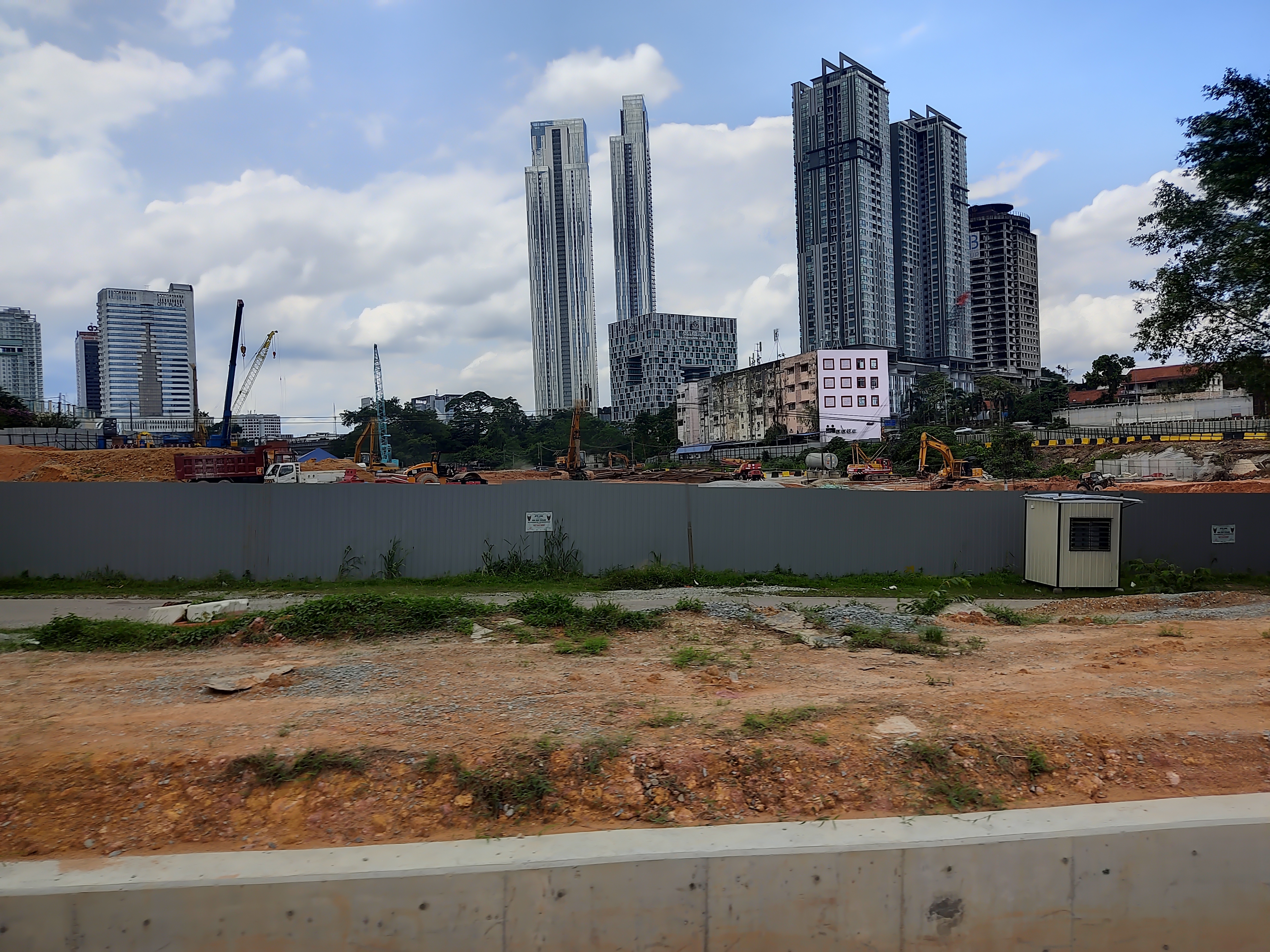
Construction site of the Wadi Hana depot

The rolling stock consists of fully automated, driverless 4-car Light Rail Vehicles (LRVs) manufactured by CRRC Zhuzhou Locomotive.

Initially announced in December 2016, the line was planned to adopt the heavy rail Thomson–East Coast Line's systems, including the trains, signalling system, communication system and Integrated Supervisory Control System. Using an integrated system this way would help achieve economies of scale. However, in an effort to cut costs, light rail vehicles (LRV) similar to the Klang Valley's Shah Alam Line was adopted instead.

The contract for the rolling stock was awarded to CRRC Zhuzhou Locomotive Co in 2021. All of the trains were manufactured at CRRC Zhuzhou Locomotive's factory in Batu Gajah, Perak. Signalling for the line was awarded to Siemens Mobility in 2021. The line will be equipped for Automated Train Operation at GoA4. It was not specified when these contracts were awarded.

The trains were unveiled during a ceremony at the Singapore Rail Test Centre on 30 June 2025. One of the eight trains will undergo testing at this facility, while the remaining seven will be tested at the new Wadi Hana depot. Trains will run in a four-car formation with a passenger capacity of 1,086, at a speed of up to 80 km/h (50 mph). The LRV trains will be maintained in Wadi Hana depot.

=== Stations ===
Legend

Elevated	Line terminus	Transfer outside paid area
Ground-level	Wheelchair accessible	Bus terminal
Underground	Civil Defence Shelter	Other transportation modes

List

Station code	Station name	Images	Interchange; Adjacent transportation	Opening
RTS(WDNS) – TE1	Woodlands North		Singapore terminus Thomson–East Coast Line	February 2027; 3 months' time
RTS(BUCS)	Bukit Chagar		Malaysia terminus 1 ETS JB Sentral; JB Sentral Bus Terminal	February 2027; 3 months' time

== See also ==
- Thomson–East Coast Line
- Iskandar Malaysia BRT
- List of bus routes in Johor Bahru
- Hengqin Line – cross-border LRT line between Macau and Mainland China
- Öresund Metro – a similar cross-border metro line proposed between Copenhagen, Denmark and Malmö, Sweden
- Øresundståg – a passenger train network operated in the transnational Øresund Region of Denmark and Sweden through the Øresund Bridge
