= Woodlands North MRT station =

MRT/RTS station in Singapore

Woodlands North TE1 – RTS 兀兰北 உட்லண்ட்ஸ் நார்த்
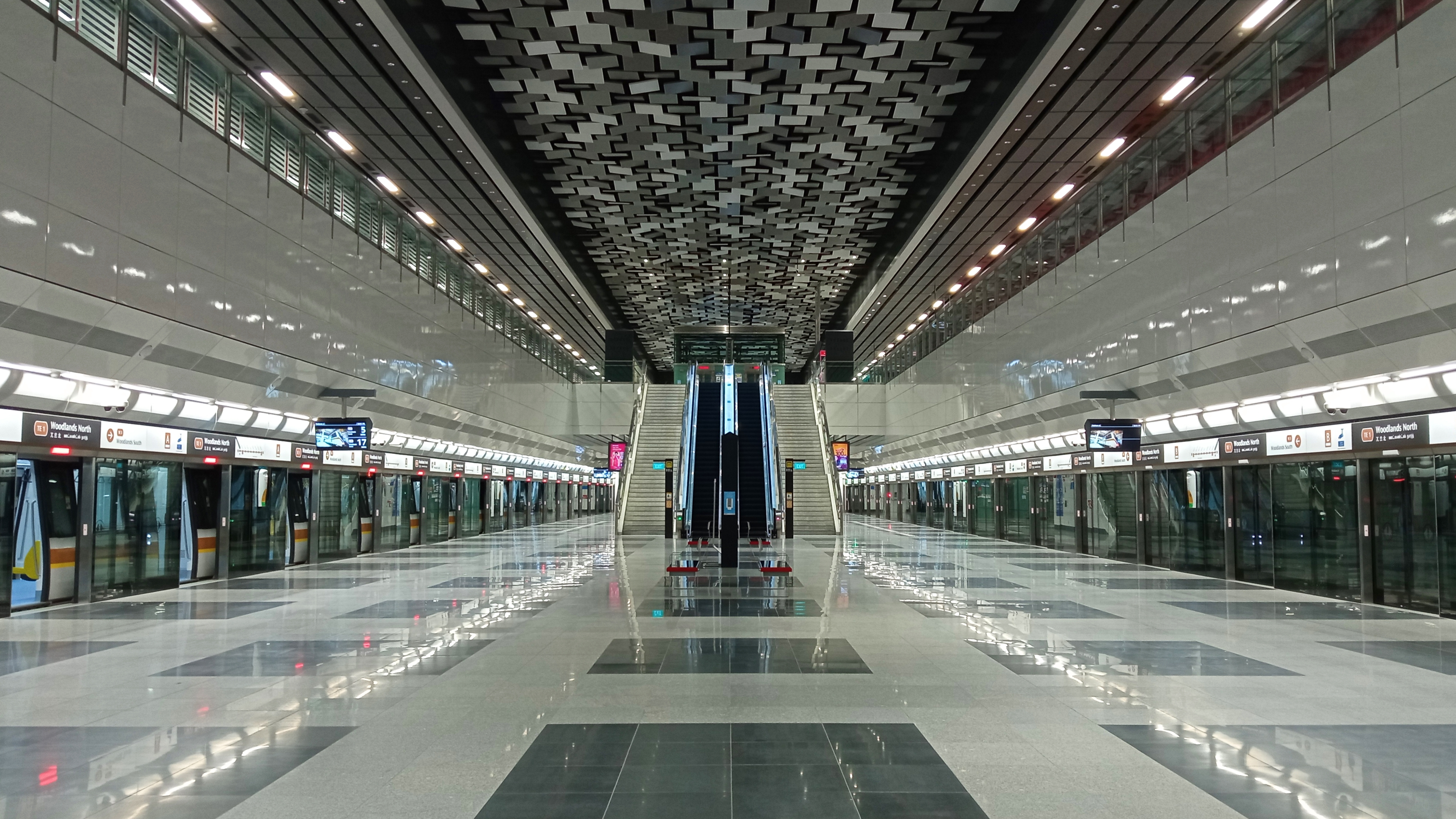
- Platform level of Woodlands North station

General information
- Location: 20 Woodlands North Coast Road, Singapore 737668 (TEL); 1 Woodlands North Coast Road, Singapore 738979 (RTS Link)
- Coordinates: 01°26′54″N 103°47′06″E
- System: Mass Rapid Transit (MRT) terminus Future RTS Link station
- Owner: Land Transport Authority
- Operator: SMRT Trains (SMRT Corporation) (TEL); RTS Operations Pte Ltd (RTS Link)
- Line: Thomson–East Coast Line Johor Bahru–Singapore Link
- Platforms: 2 (1 island platform)
- Tracks: 2
- Connections: Bus, taxi

Construction
- Structure type: Underground
- Platform levels: 1
- Parking: Yes (Republic Polytechnic)
- Accessible: Yes

Other information
- Station code: WDN

History
- Opened: 31 January 2020; 6 years ago (TEL)
- Opening: February 2027; 3 months' time (RTS Link)
- Former names: Republic Crescent, Admiralty Park

Passengers
- June 2024: 4,990 per day

Services
Preceding station	Mass Rapid Transit	Following station
Terminus	Thomson–East Coast Line	Woodlands towards Bayshore
Preceding station	RTS Link	Following station
Bukit Chagar Terminus	Johor Bahru–Singapore Link	Terminus
Track layout
Location
- Location within Singapore Rail

Woodlands North MRT station is an underground Mass Rapid Transit (MRT) station in Woodlands, Singapore. The station is the northern terminus of the Thomson–East Coast Line (TEL). It is located at the centre of Woodlands North at Woodlands North Coast Road, off Admiralty Road West, and is adjacent to Republic Polytechnic (RP). The station is envisioned to serve the Woodlands North Coast project, a mixed-use business and lifestyle precinct in the far north of the country designed by Arup and built by JTC.

The station was one of the first three TEL stations to be opened on 31 January 2020 as part of Stage 1. During its construction, plans were made for the station to be linked with the Johor Bahru–Singapore RTS, which was confirmed in 2012. Construction began in 2021, and it will be the Singapore terminus of the RTS when it is completed in February 2027.

== History ==
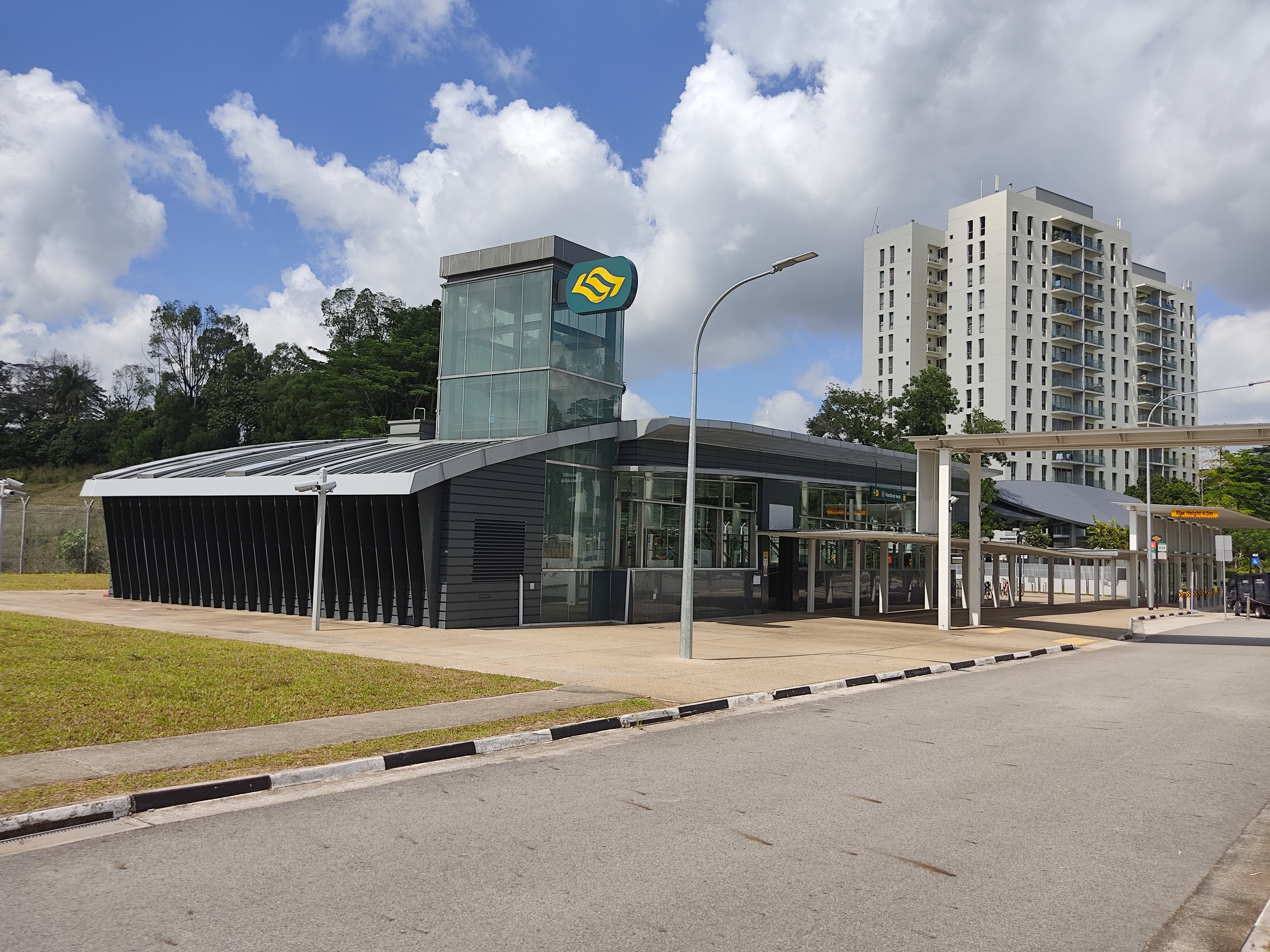
Exit 1 of the station

The station was first announced as part of the 22-station Thomson Line (TSL) on 29 August 2012. Contract T202 for the design and construction of Woodlands North Station and associated tunnels was awarded to Penta-Ocean Construction Co Ltd for S$337 million (US$247 million) in November 2013. Construction started in 2014 with a scheduled completion date of 2019.

On 15 August 2014, the Land Transport Authority (LTA) announced that TSL would merge with the Eastern Region Line to form the Thomson–East Coast Line (TEL). The station was constructed as part of Phase 1 (TEL1), consisting of three stations between this station and Woodlands South.

On 19 September 2019, it was announced by then Transport Minister Khaw Boon Wan that TEL1 will open before the end of January 2020. The LTA later announced in December that the TEL1 stations would be opened on 31 January 2020. Before the stations commenced operations on that day, an open house for the TEL 1 stations was held on 11 January 2020.

=== RTS Link ===
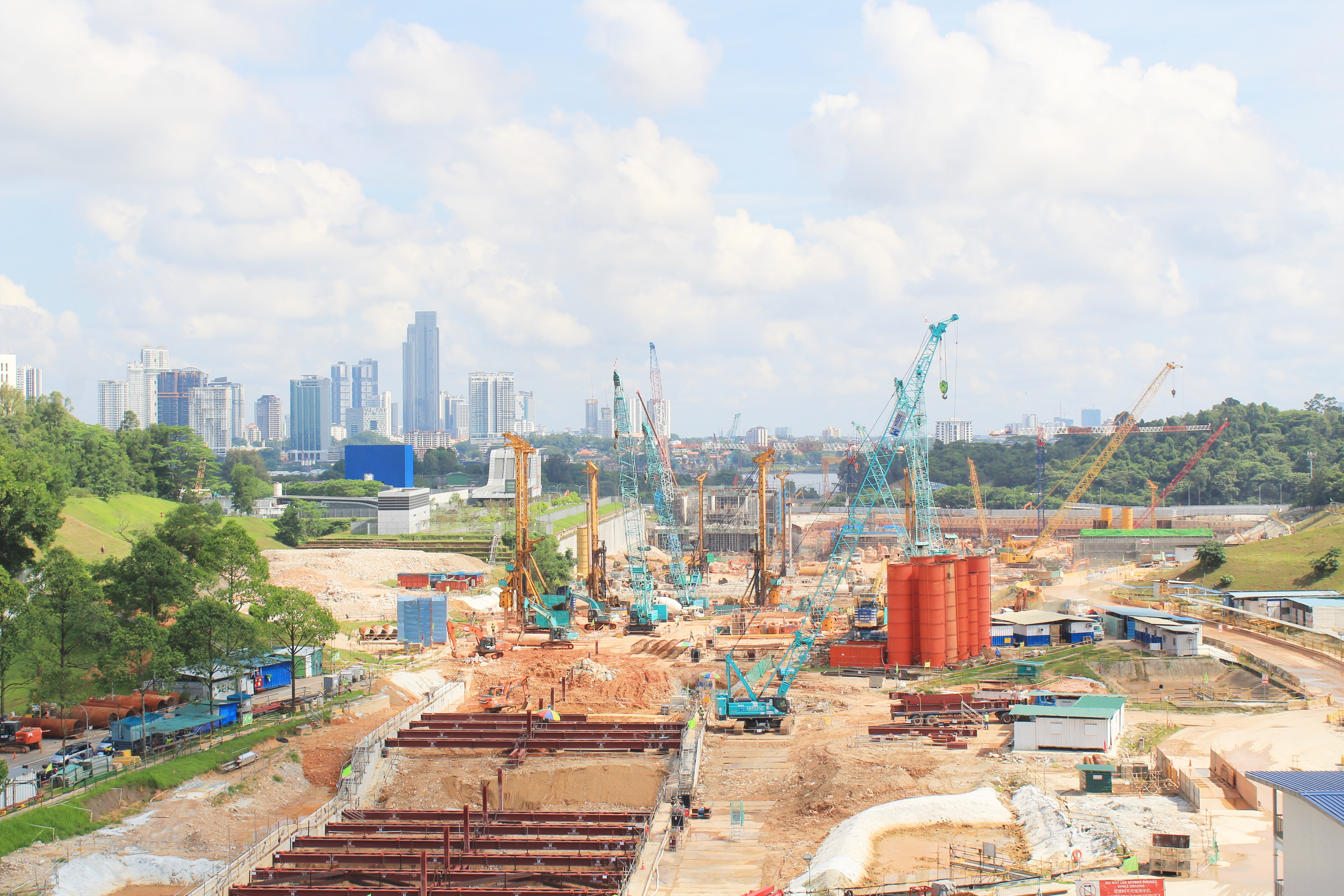
RTS construction site in April 2023

In June 2011, it was announced that the northern terminus of the TEL will be connected to the proposed cross border rail link. On 16 January 2018, a bilateral agreement on the project was signed between Malaysia and Singapore, during the 8th Singapore-Malaysia Leaders' Retreat. The agreement finalised certain aspects of the project, including its maintenance facilities, operator, and customs facilities.

However, the project was postponed on 21 May 2019 due to financial implications on Malaysia's side. On 31 October that year, Malaysia agreed to resume the RTS project at a lower cost although the project is still suspended until 30 April 2020. Due to the COVID-19 pandemic, it was agreed that the project be suspended further until 31 July 2020. The project officially resumed on 30 July 2020.

The contract for the construction of the RTS Link Woodlands North station and associated tunnels was awarded to Penta-Ocean Construction Co Ltd for S$932.8 million (US$683.8 million). The contract includes the construction of Singapore's Customs, Immigration, and Quarantine (CIQ) building. On 22 January 2021, construction of the Singaporean side of the RTS link began with a groundbreaking ceremony near the station. On 29 January 2021, China Communications Construction Company Limited (Singapore branch) was awarded the second contract to construct tunnels and viaducts at a value of S$180 million (US$135.24 million). The King of Malaysia Ibrahim Iskandar of Johor visited the station on 7 May 2024 during his state visit to Singapore.

Construction of the RTS Link Woodlands North station was completed on 4 September 2026. Final testing along the railway is in progress before its opening in February 2027.

== Station details ==
Station interior

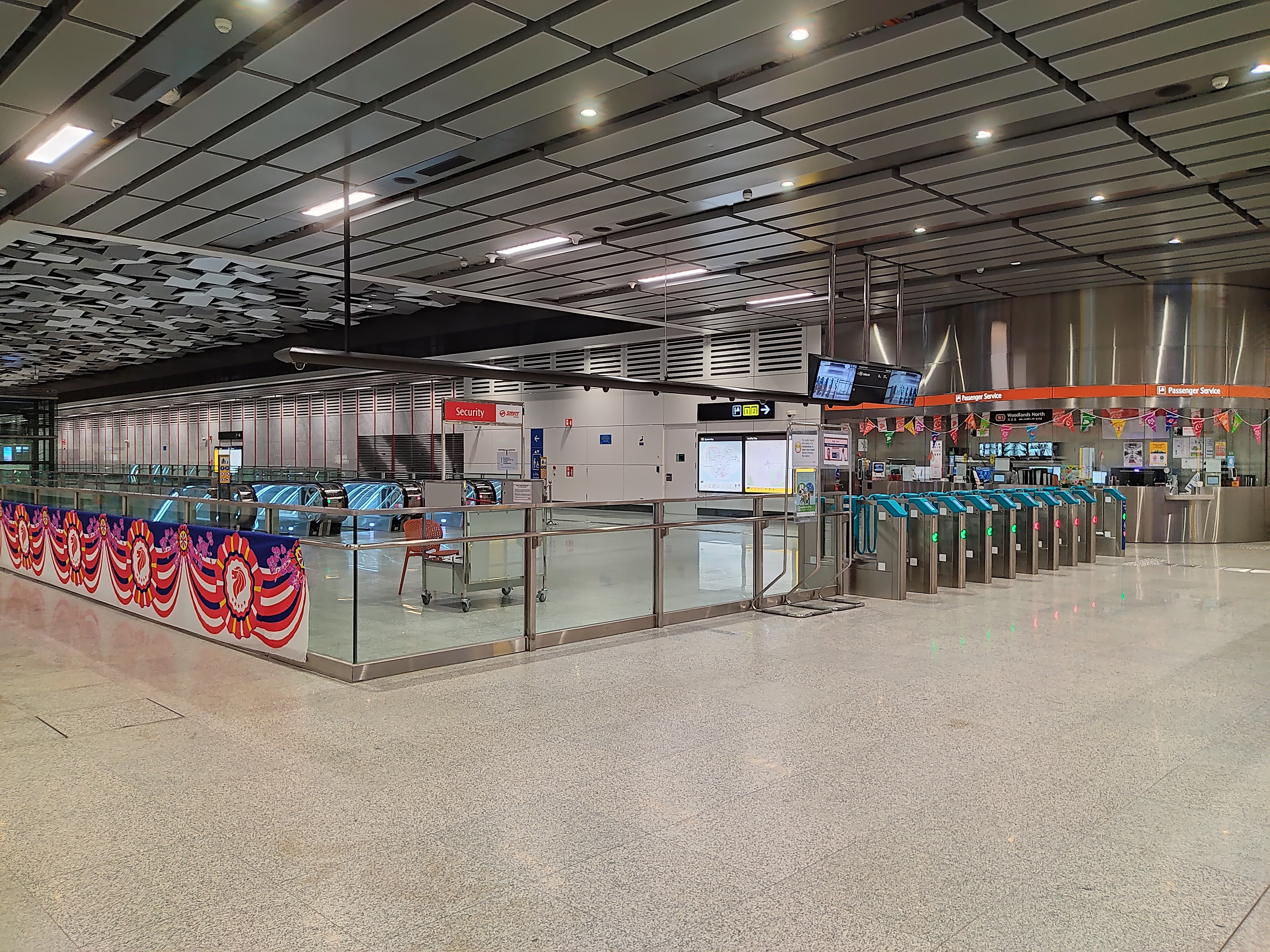
Ticket barriers and passenger service at the station

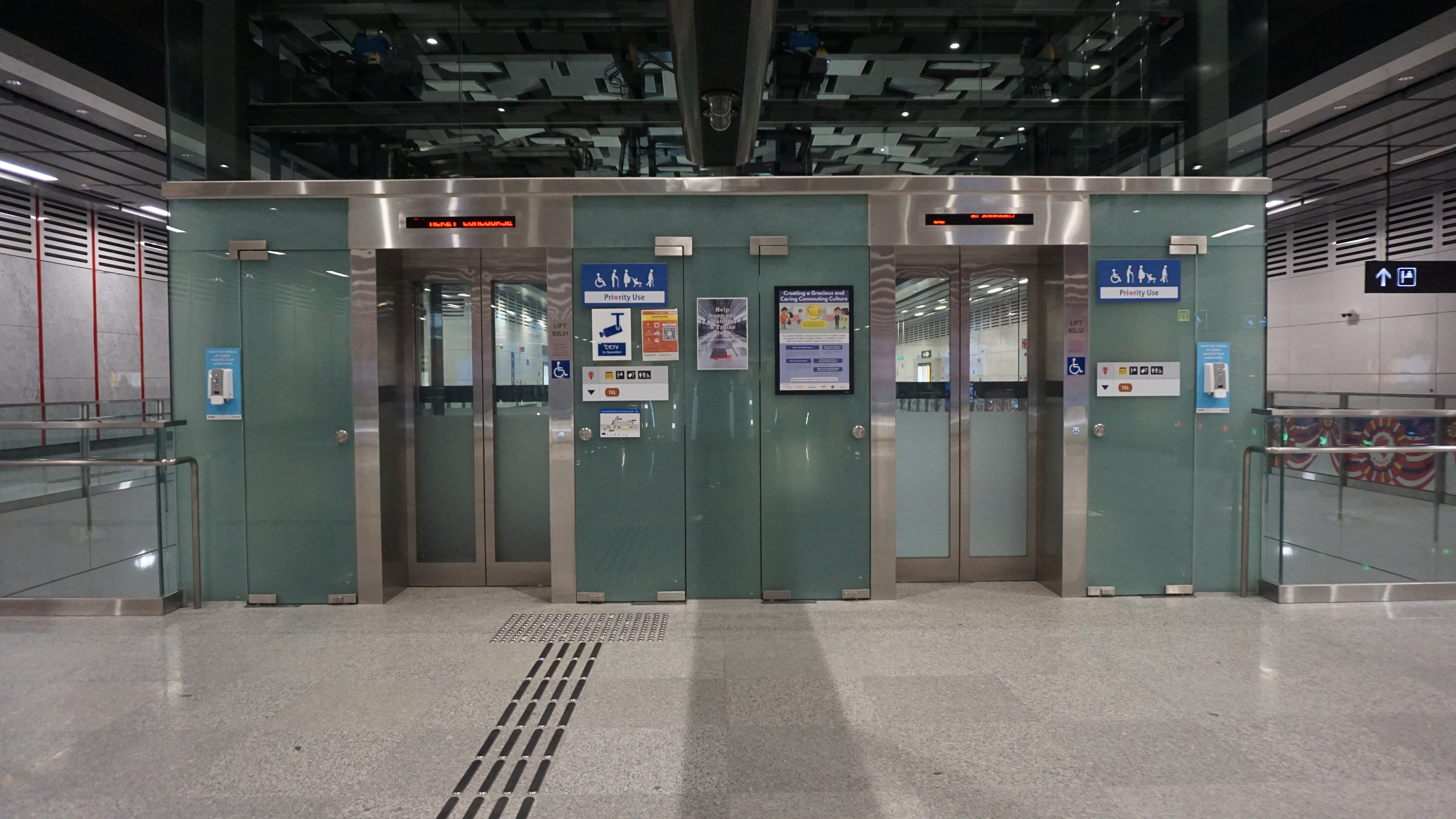
Station lifts to the TEL platforms

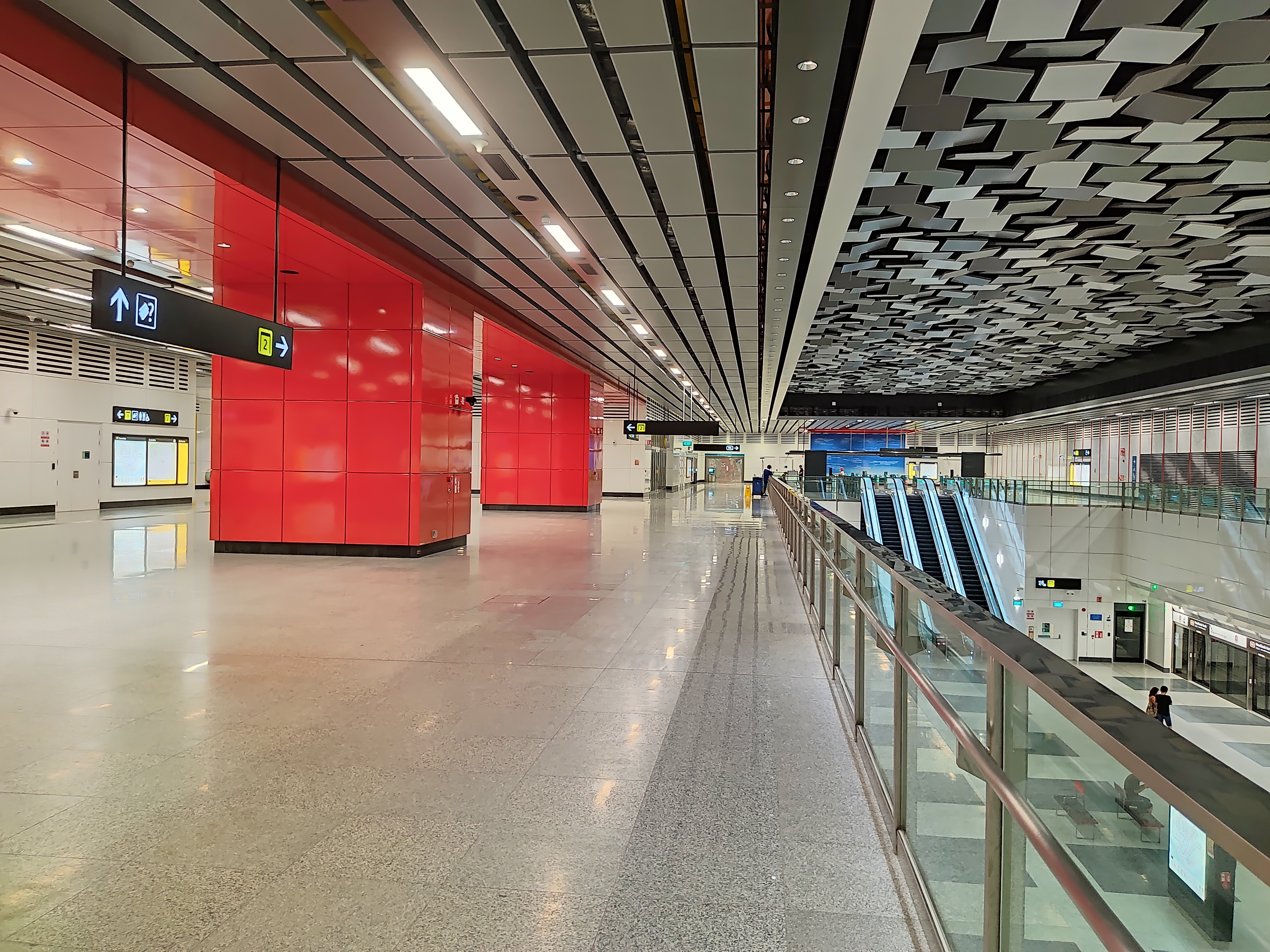
Station concourse

=== Design ===
The station's interior has a red and white scheme that was inspired by the National Flag of Singapore, to welcome visitors coming from Malaysia into the country. The station also features aluminium ceiling panels above the platforms which mimic the movements of the daily flux of commuters. The station is relatively larger than typical MRT stations, as it was designed to accommodate the heavy passenger traffic between Woodlands and Johor Bahru. There are two exits from the station.

The RTS station is to be built underground at a maximum depth of 28 metres (92 ft). The station will have three levels, including an underground linkway to the Customs, Immigration, and Quarantine (CIQ) building. The station size, including the CIQ building, will be 10 times the typical size of an MRT station. The RTS station and the CIQ building, built next to the TEL station, will be integrated with the station via an underground concourse.

=== Artwork ===
As part of the Art-in-Transit (AiT) programme, the artwork displayed here is "New Departures" by Amanda Heng, a montage of quotes from residents and a skyline of Woodlands. This artwork explores borders and boundaries from a personal, rather than physical perspective. It was created to encourage commuters to take on their daily life with "courage and positivity." The artwork draws on the role of this station being the future interchange of the cross-border RTS link between Singapore and Johor Bahru.
