= Orchard Boulevard MRT station =

Mass Rapid Transit station in Singapore

Orchard Boulevard TE13 乌节大道 ஆர்ச்சர்ட் பொலிவார்ட்
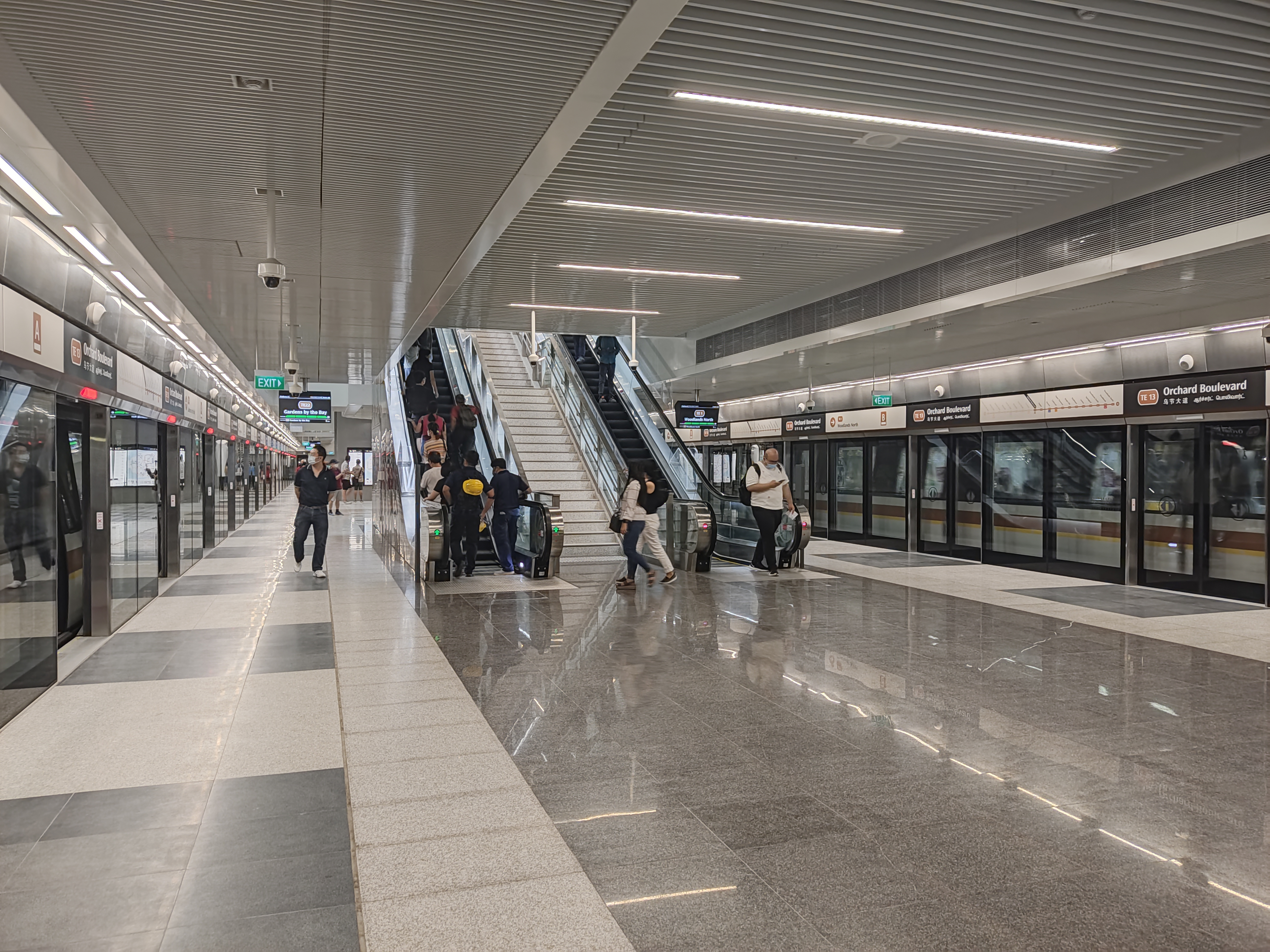
- Platform level of Orchard Boulevard MRT station

General information
- Location: 20 Orchard Boulevard, Singapore 248654
- Coordinates: 01°18′09″N 103°49′26″E
- System: Mass Rapid Transit (MRT) station
- Owner: Land Transport Authority
- Operator: SMRT Trains
- Line: Thomson–East Coast Line
- Platforms: 2 (1 island platform)
- Tracks: 2
- Connections: Bus, Taxi

Construction
- Structure type: Underground
- Platform levels: 1
- Accessible: Yes

Other information
- Station code: OBV

History
- Opened: 13 November 2022; 3 years ago
- Former names: Tanglin, Grange Road

Passengers
- June 2024: 3,406 per day

Services
Preceding station	Mass Rapid Transit	Following station
Napier towards Woodlands North	Thomson–East Coast Line	Orchard towards Bayshore
Track layout
Location
- Location within Singapore Rail central area

Orchard Boulevard MRT station is an underground Mass Rapid Transit station on the Thomson–East Coast Line (TEL). Situated in Orchard, Singapore, the station is at the end of Orchard Boulevard with Grange Road. Surrounding developments include Camden Medical Centre, Tanglin Mall, JEN by Shangri-La Hotel and various embassies.

First announced in August 2012 as part of the Thomson Line (TSL), the station was constructed as part of TEL Phase 3 (TEL 3) with the merger of the TSL and the Eastern Region Line. The station opened on 13 November 2022. An Art-in-Transit artwork by Twardzik Ching Chor Leng, PULSE, is displayed at this station.

== History ==
The station was first announced on 29 August 2012 as part of the Thomson Line (TSL). Contract T218 for the design and construction of Orchard Boulevard Station was awarded to KTC Civil Engineering & Construction Pte Ltd at S$143 million (US$114.3 million) in May 2014. Construction started in 2014, with an initial expected completion date of 2021.

On 15 August 2014, the Land Transport Authority (LTA) announced that the TSL would merge with the Eastern Region Line to form the Thomson–East Coast Line (TEL). Orchard Boulevard station, part of the proposed line, would be constructed as part of TEL 3, consisting of 13 stations between Mount Pleasant and Gardens by the Bay. With restrictions imposed on construction due to the COVID-19 pandemic, the TEL3 completion date was pushed by one year to 2022.

On 9 March 2022, Transport Minister S Iswaran announced in Parliament that TEL 3 would open in the second half of that year. As confirmed during a visit by Iswaran at the Outram Park and Maxwell stations on 7 October 2022, the station began operations on 13 November.

== Description ==
Construction progress of the station

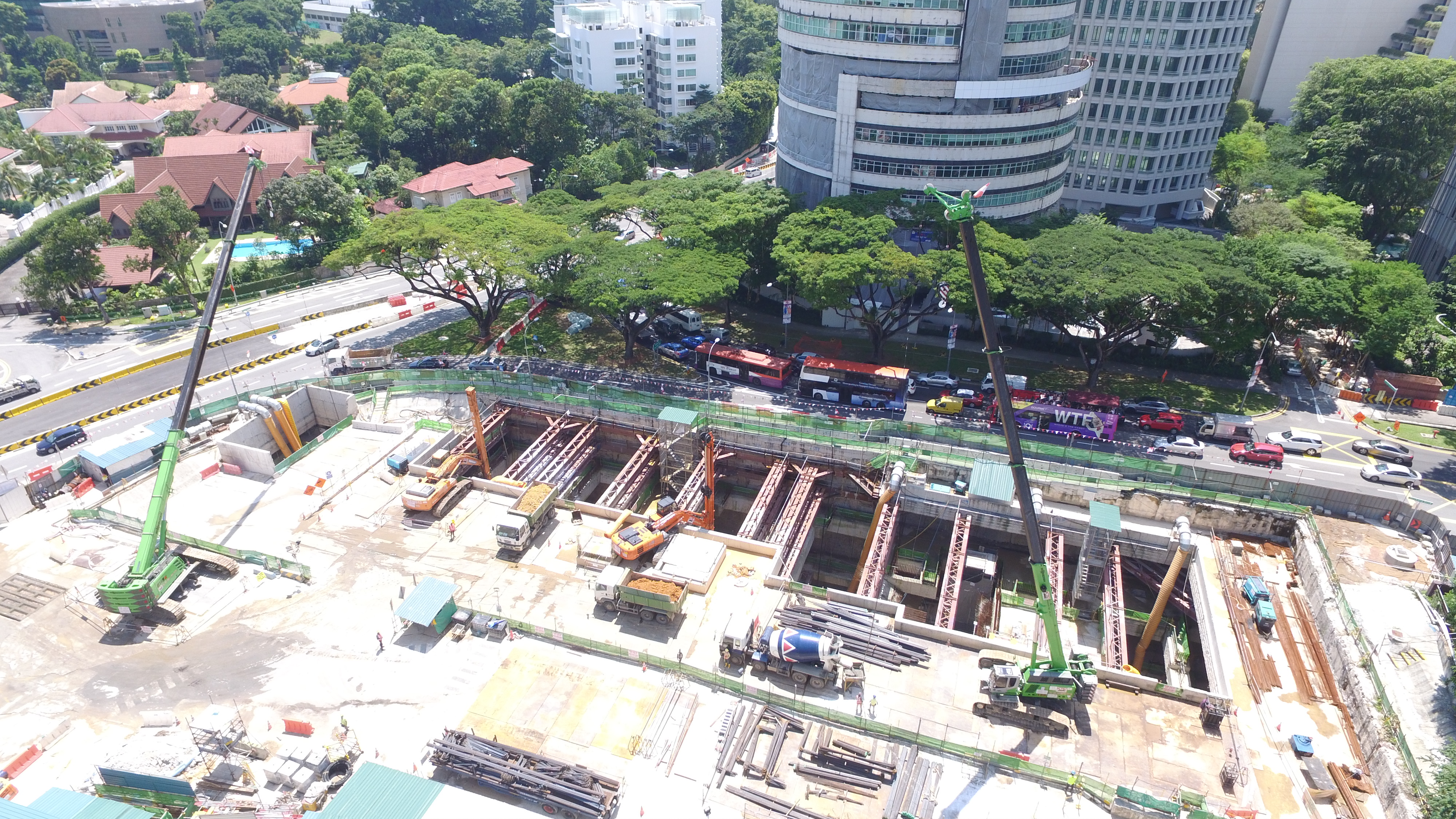
Station site in July 2017

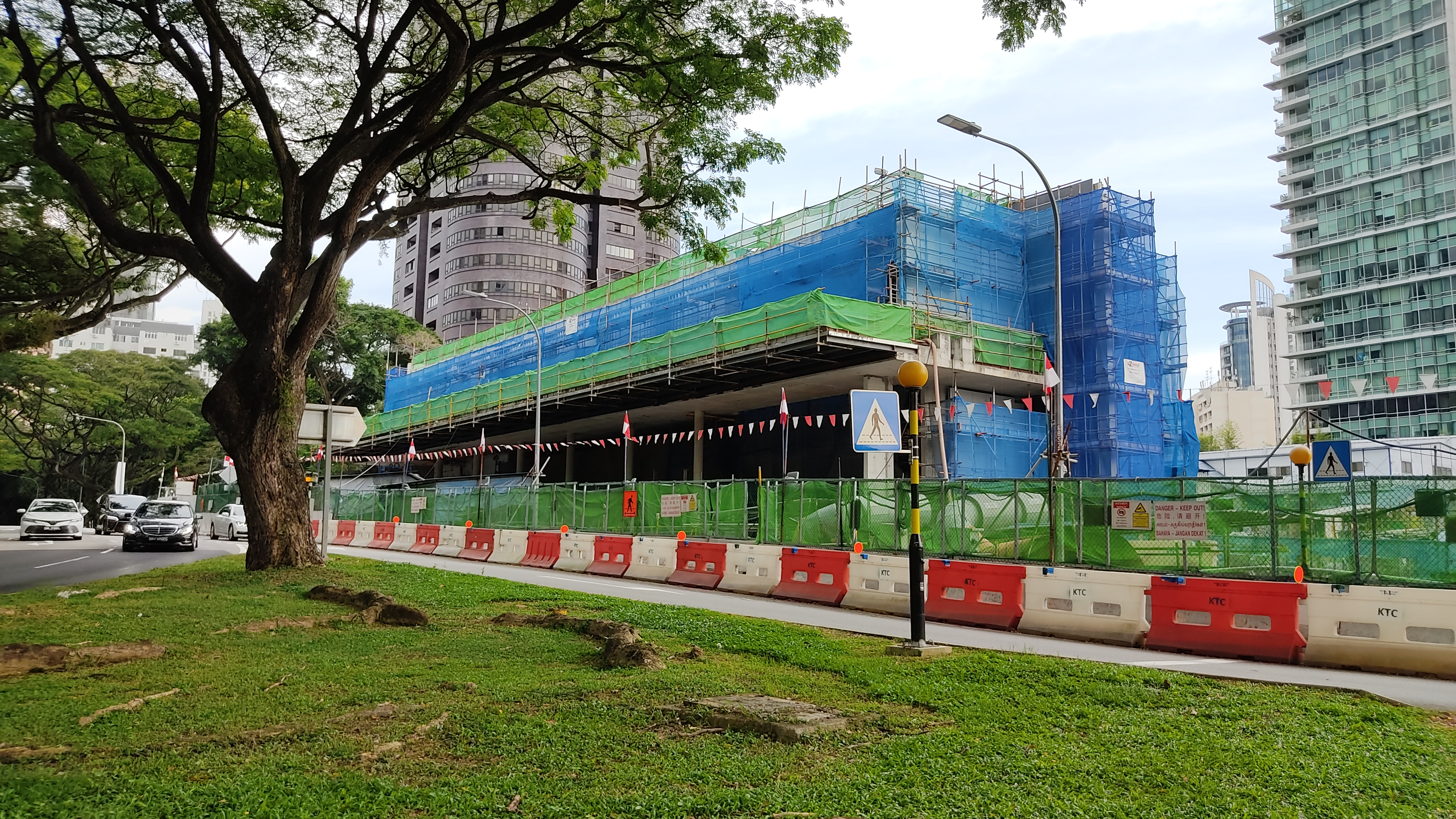
The entrance in November 2020

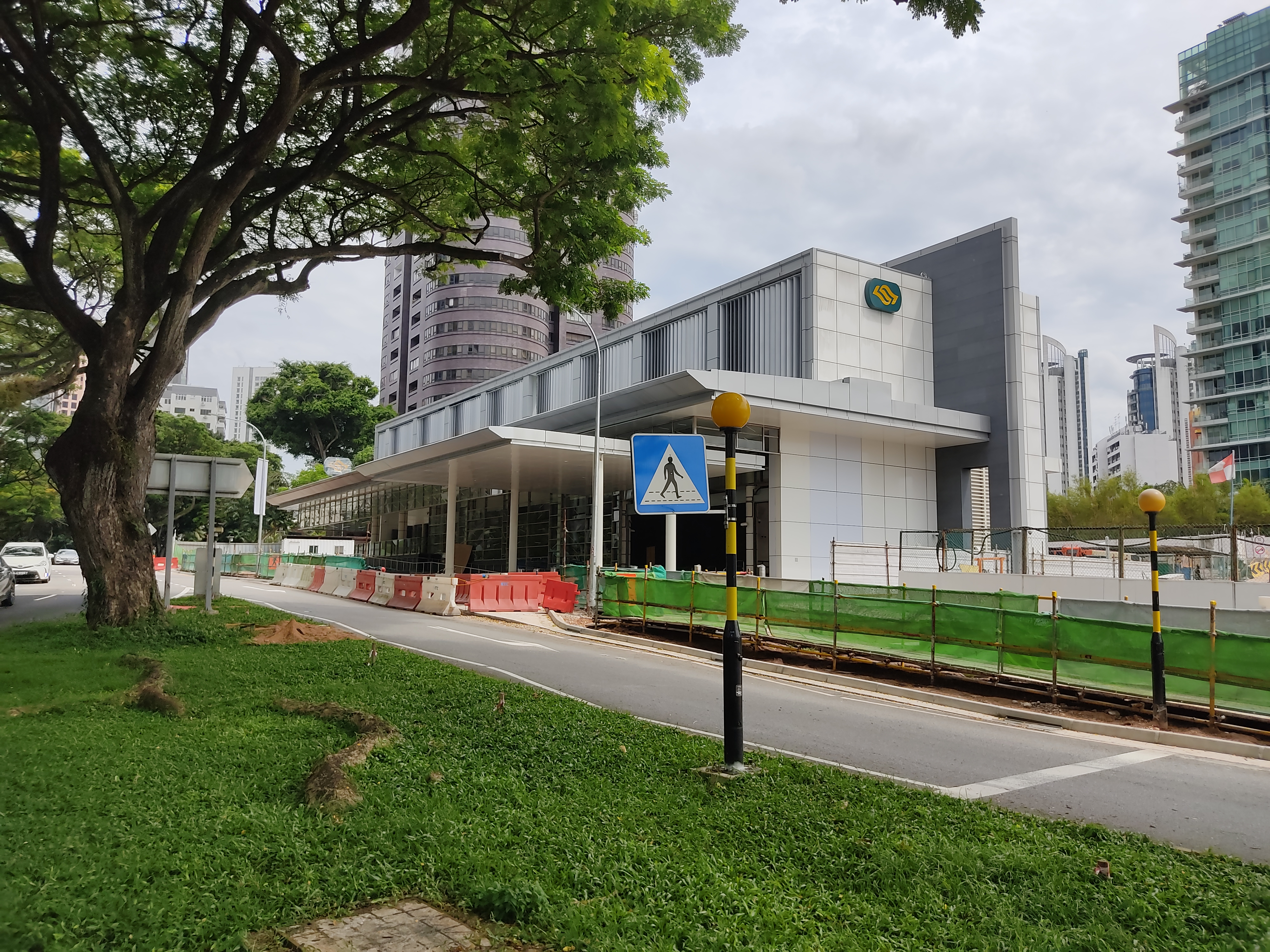
The entrance in November 2021

Orchard Boulevard station serves the TEL and is between the Napier and Orchard stations. The official station code is TE13. Being part of the TEL, the station is operated by SMRT Trains. Train frequencies on the TEL range from 3 to 6 minutes.

The station is located along Orchard Boulevard at the junction with Grange Road and Rochalie Drive. Surrounding landmarks of the station include: Camden Medical Centre, the Chinese embassy, the US embassy, Jen Singapore Tanglin by Shangri-La, Orchard Rendezvous Hotel, Tanglin Shopping Centre and Tudor Court Shopping Gallery.

Orchard Boulevard station was designed by SAA Architects, who had to resolve the contradicting requirements of providing adequate ventilation and natural daylight, while being situated in a confined site also reserved for future development near the station. Hence, the main entrance was integrated with ventilation shafts, cooling towers, and skylights built right above the station box. This allowed for a three-tiered mezzanine and a wall created by the shafts where the station artwork would be placed, with sunlight streaming into the interior. Throughout the day, the changing position of the sun results in varying interactions between sunlight, the installation artwork, and the walls of the shafts, intended to bring vibrancy and animation to different sections of the station. The station entrances' materials, such as aluminium, granite, and glass, complement the surrounding architectural landscape.

Pulse (stylised in all caps) by Twardzik Ching Chor Leng is a network of industrial-scale pipes that hang over the station concourse. The work is intended to depict the constant circulation of people on the MRT system and its importance in keeping the city alive, paralleling the functions of the human circulatory system that maintains the flow of nutrients.
