= Stevens MRT station =

Mass Rapid Transit station in Singapore

Stevens DT10 TE11 史蒂芬 ஸ்டீவன்ஸ்
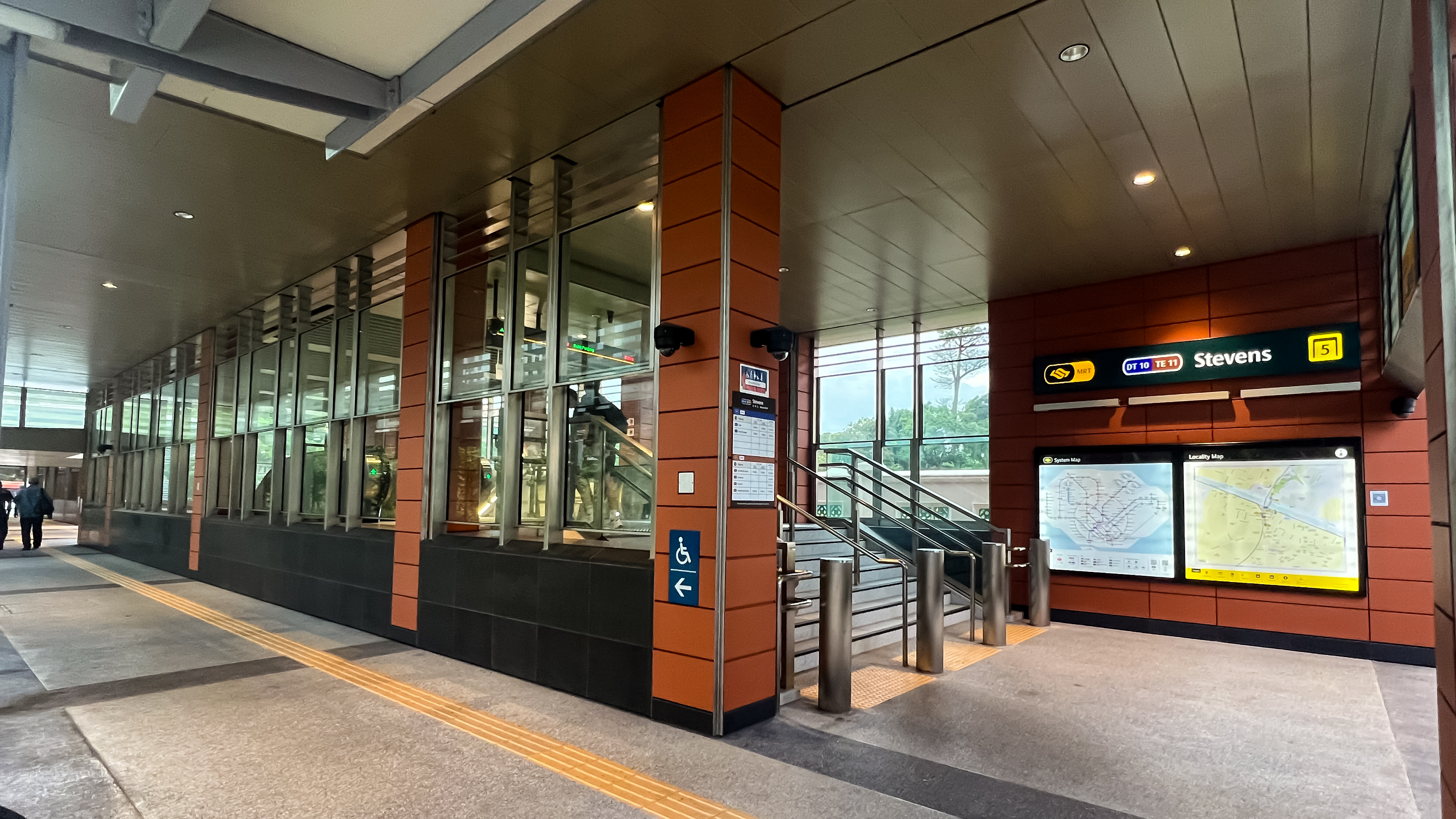
- Exit 5 of Stevens MRT station

General information
- Location: 92 Stevens Road, Singapore 257877 (DTL); 82 Stevens Road, Singapore 257879 (TEL)
- Coordinates: 01°19′12″N 103°49′34″E
- System: Mass Rapid Transit (MRT) interchange
- Owner: Land Transport Authority
- Operator: SBS Transit (Downtown Line); SMRT Trains (Thomson–East Coast Line)
- Line: Downtown Line Thomson–East Coast Line
- Platforms: 4 (2 stacked platforms, 1 island platform)
- Tracks: 4
- Connections: Bus, Taxi

Construction
- Structure type: Underground
- Platform levels: 3
- Accessible: Yes

Other information
- Station code: STV

History
- Opened: 27 December 2015; 10 years ago (Downtown Line); 13 November 2022; 4 years ago (Thomson–East Coast Line)
- Former names: Whitley, Wayang Satu

Passengers
- June 2024: 6,799 per day

Services
Preceding station	Mass Rapid Transit	Following station
Botanic Gardens towards Bukit Panjang	Downtown Line	Newton towards Expo
Caldecott towards Woodlands North	Thomson–East Coast Line	Napier towards Bayshore
Mount Pleasant towards Woodlands North	Thomson–East Coast Line Future service	Napier towards Bayshore
Track layout
Location
- Location within Singapore Rail central area

Stevens MRT station is an underground Mass Rapid Transit (MRT) interchange station on the Downtown (DTL) and Thomson–East Coast (TEL) lines. Situated at the junction of Stevens Road and Bukit Timah Road, it serves the nearby Singapore Chinese Girls' School and St. Joseph's Institution, as well as the Raffles Town Club and the surrounding private estates.

The station was first announced in July 2008 as part of DTL Stage 2 (DTL2) and opened on 27 December 2015. Two new exits at Dunearn Road and Whitley Road opened on 23 November 2019. In August 2012, it was announced that the station would interchange with the planned TEL. Initially expected to be opened in 2021, the TEL station only opened on 13 November 2022 along with the TEL Stage 3 (TEL3) stations.

Stevens station showcases two art pieces as part of the MRT network's Art-in-Transit programme. The DTL entrance features PIN – 23040 by Om Mee Ai, while the TEL concourse features A Syllabus For Stevens by Shubigi Rao.

== History ==
=== Downtown Line ===
Construction progress of the DTL station

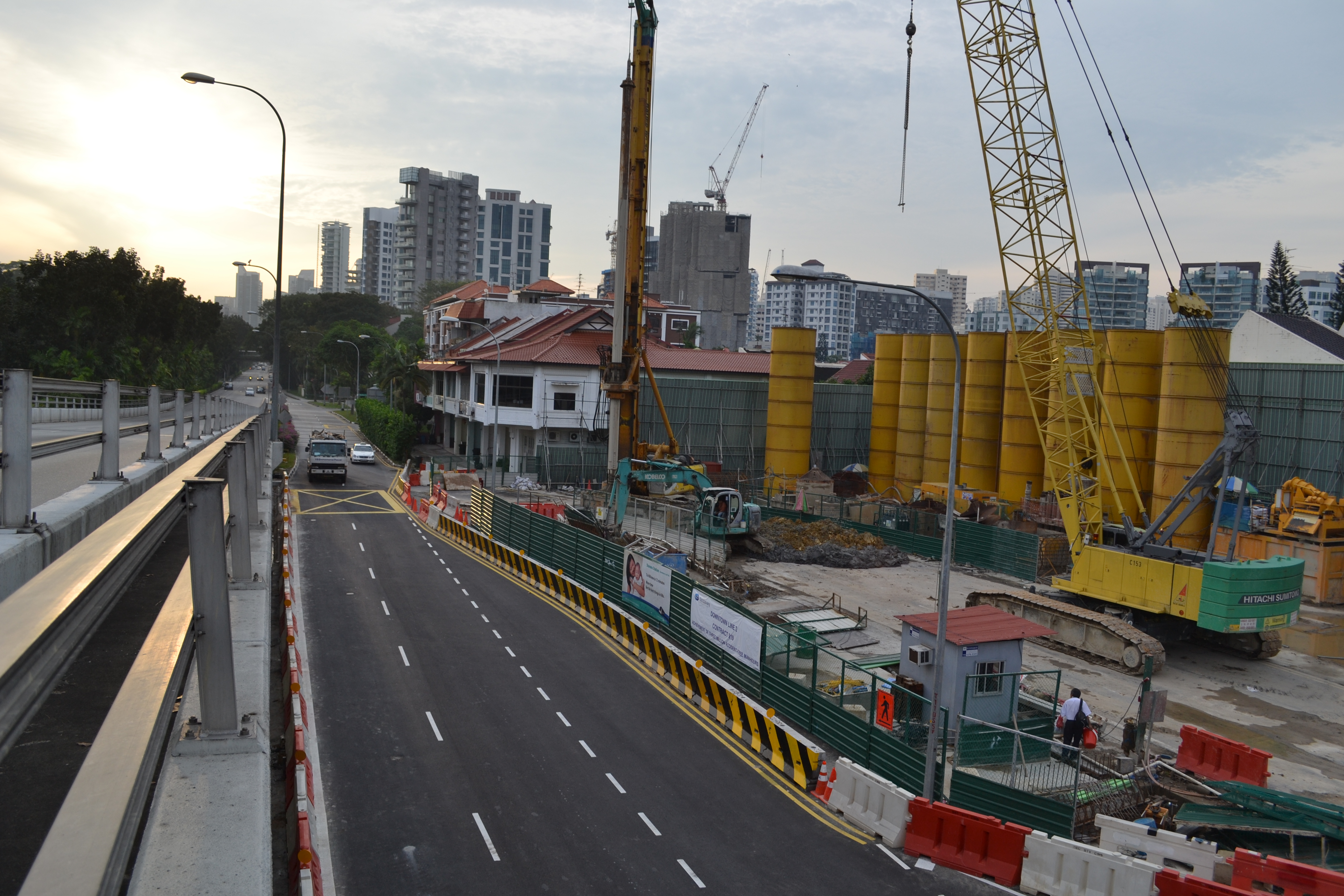
Stevens station under construction in January 2012

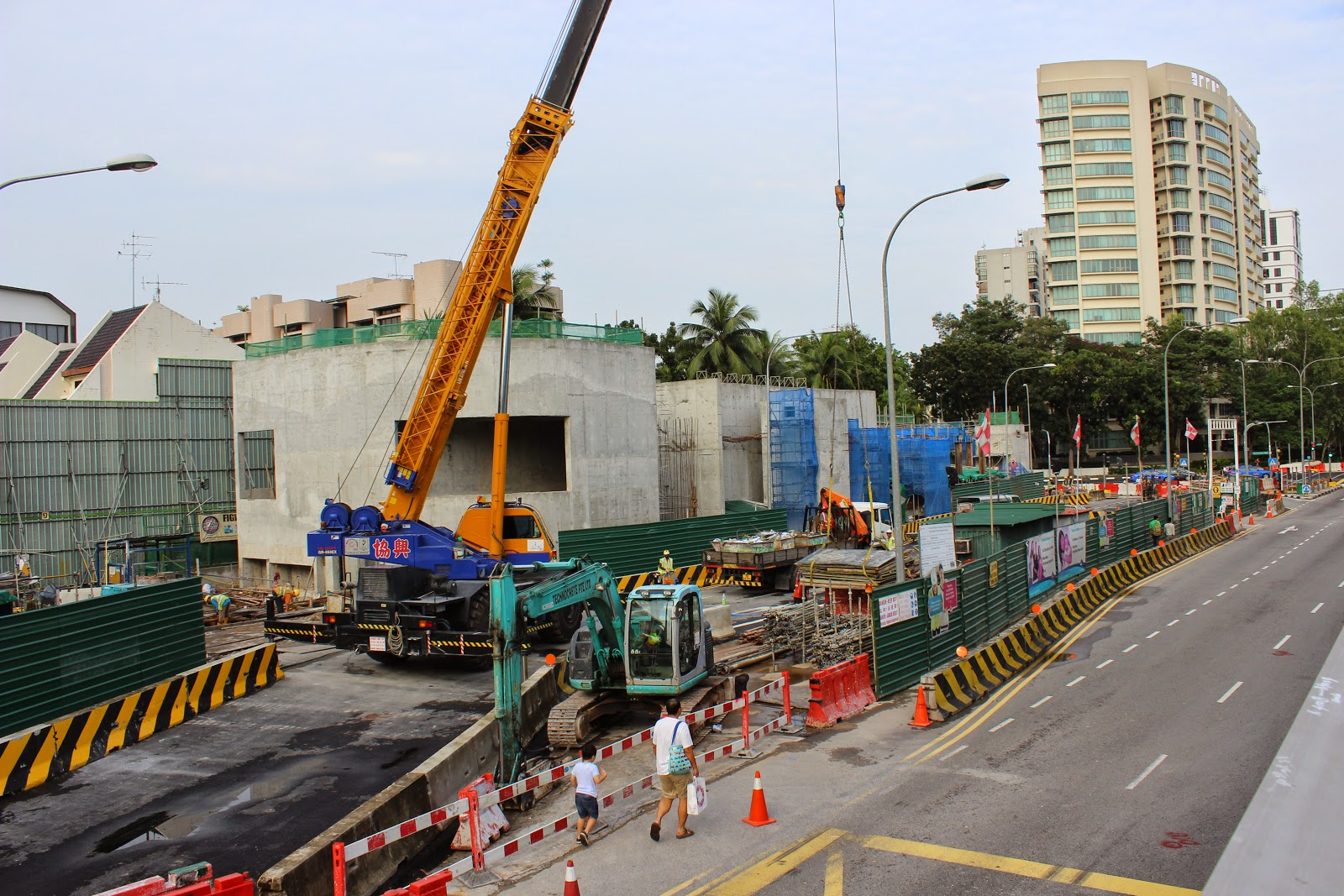
Near completion of the station entrance in September 2014

The station was first announced as part of Downtown Line Stage 2 (DTL2) on 15 July 2008. After a public poll in 2009, the station kept its working name of "Stevens".

The contract for the design and construction of Stevens station and associated tunnels was awarded to Sembawang Engineers and Constructors Pte Ltd for S$378.2 million (US$260.02 million) in July 2009. The contract also included the construction of the adjacent Botanic Gardens station. Construction of the station was scheduled to commence in the third quarter of 2009 and targeted to complete by 2015.

The station opened on 27 December 2015 along with the other DTL Stage 2 stations. Two other entrances, Exits B and C, opened on 23 November 2019. The 65-metre (213 ft) underpass was built using new tunnel technology, a rectangular tunnel boring machine (RTBM), which minimised disruptions on the ground and enabled the construction to be completed ahead of schedule.

=== Thomson–East Coast Line ===
Construction progress of the TEL station

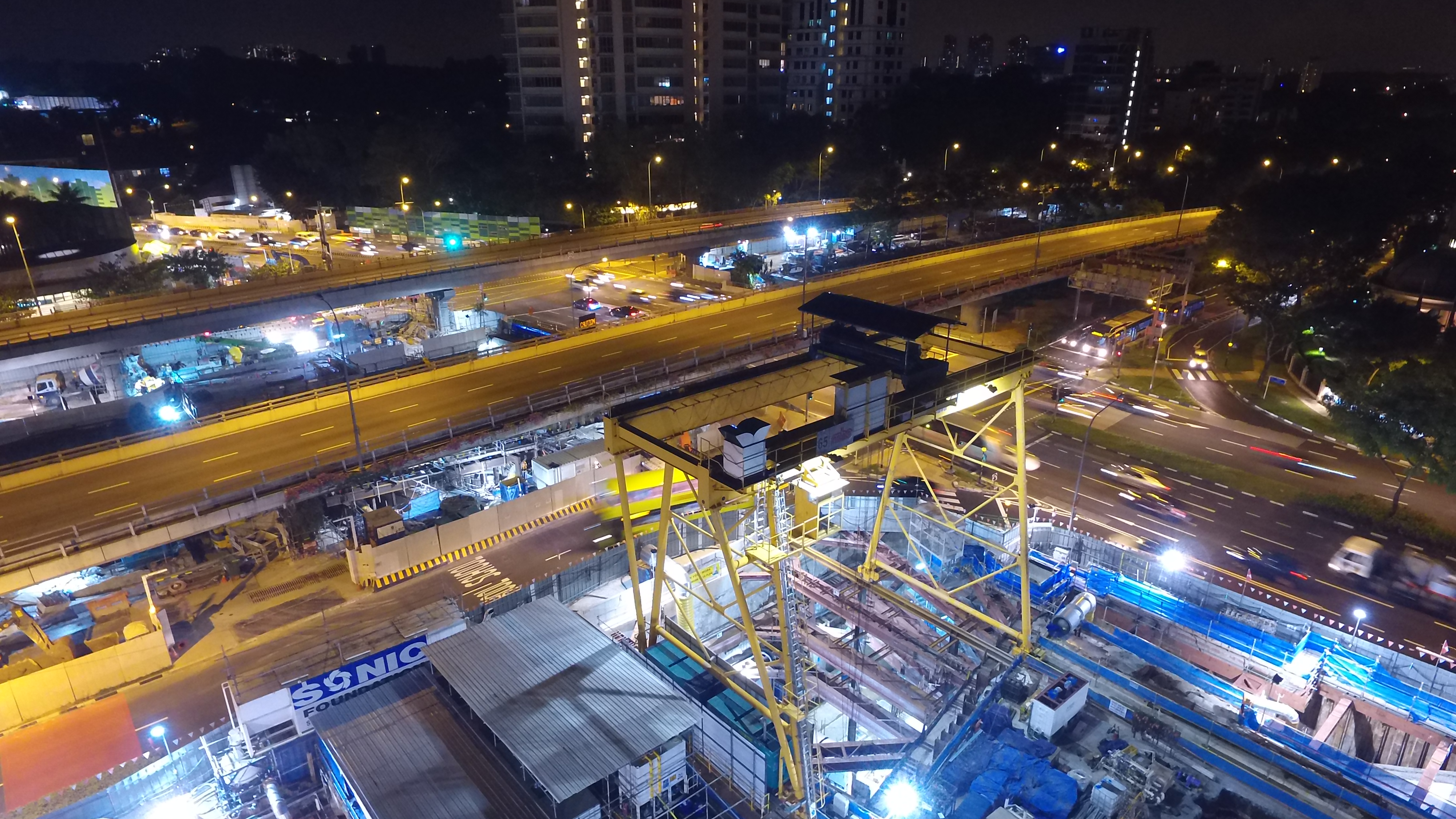
Construction of the TEL station in September 2017

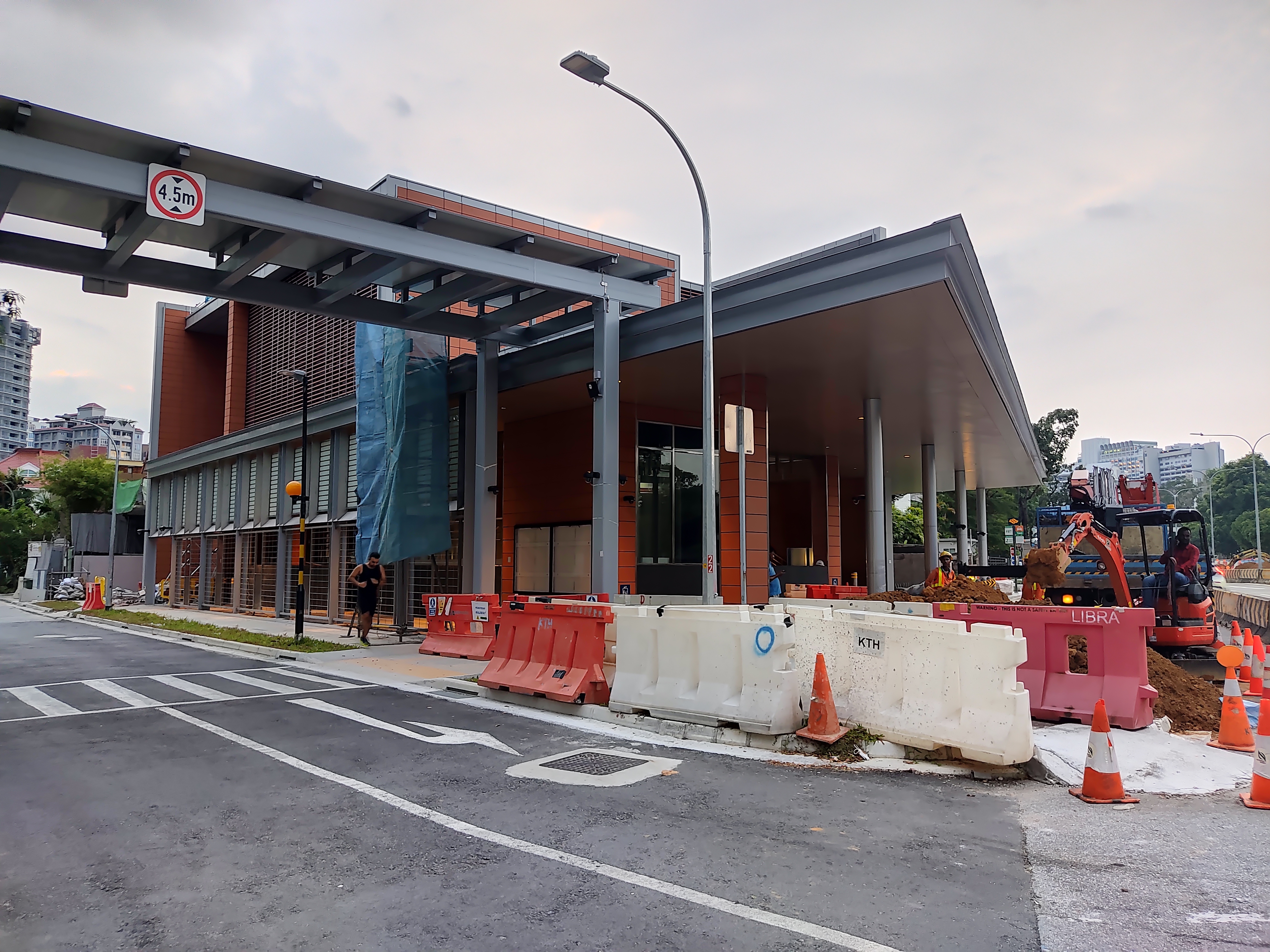
The TEL entrance nearing completion

Stevens station was first announced to be an interchange station with the planned 22-station Thomson Line (TSL) on 29 August 2012. The contract for the design and construction of Stevens TEL Station and associated tunnels was awarded to Daewoo Engineering & Construction Co. Ltd for S$441 million (US$348 million) in April 2014. Construction of the station began in January 2015, and was expected to be completed in 2021.

On 15 August 2014, the LTA further announced that the TSL would merge with the Eastern Region Line to form the Thomson–East Coast Line (TEL). Stevens station, part of the proposed line, would be constructed as part of TEL3, consisting of 13 stations between Mount Pleasant and Gardens by the Bay. With restrictions imposed on construction due to the COVID-19 pandemic, the TEL3 completion date was pushed by one year to 2022. On 9 March 2022, Transport Minister S Iswaran announced in Parliament that TEL 3 would open in the second half of that year.

As confirmed during a visit by Iswaran at the Outram Park and Maxwell stations on 7 October 2022, the TEL station began operations on 13 November.

== Details ==
Platforms of the station

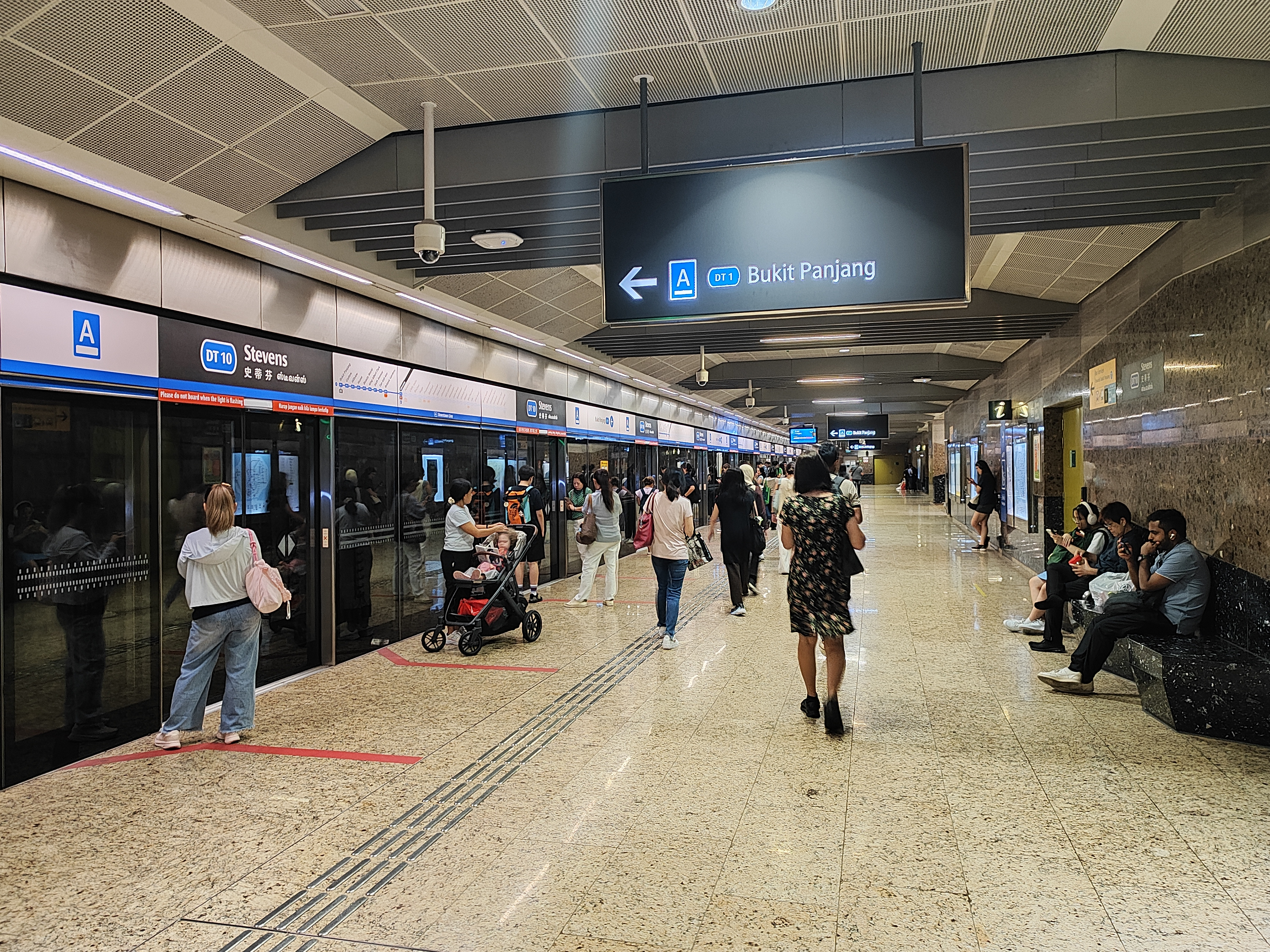
DTL Platform A

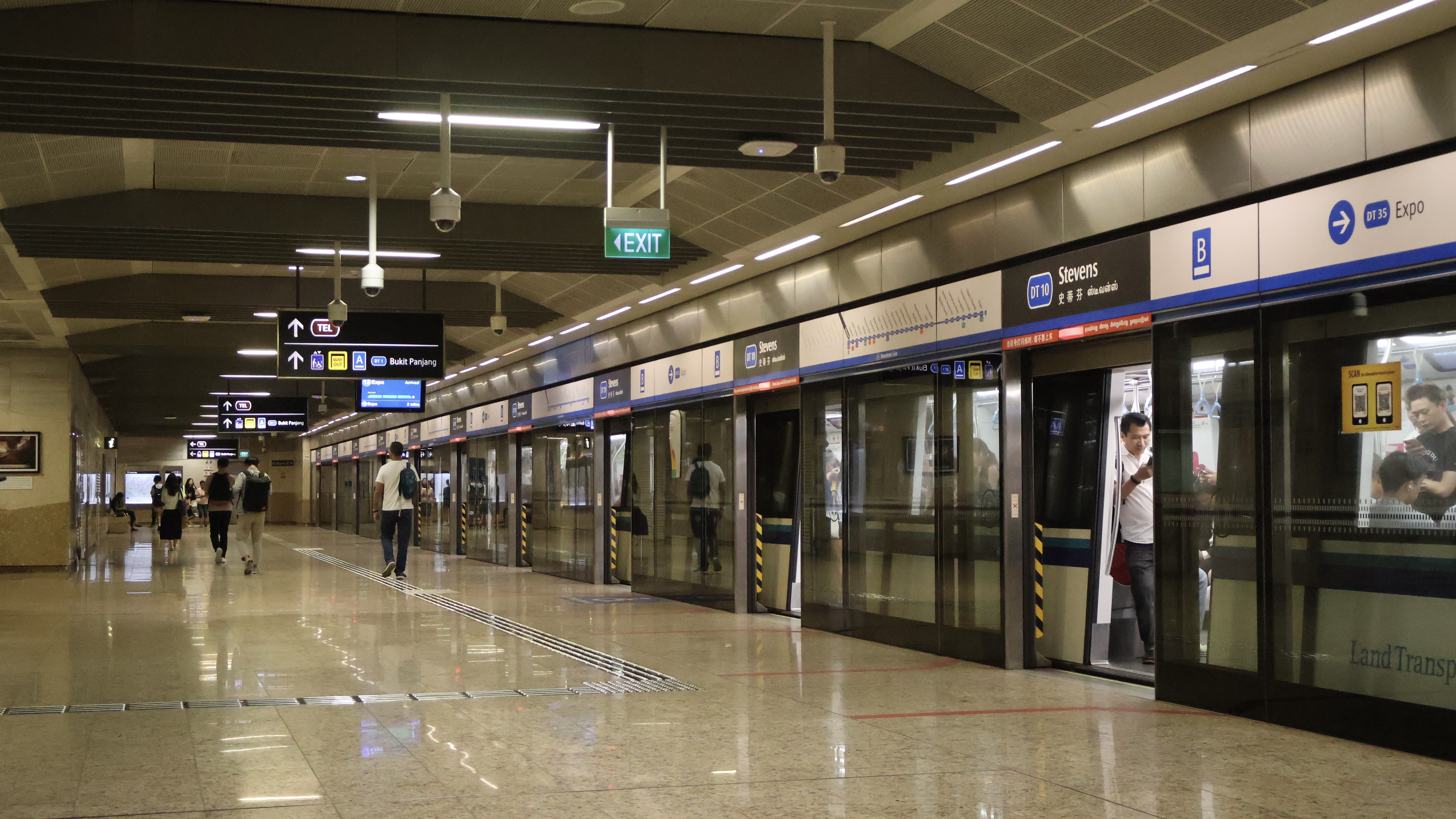
DTL Platform B, which is on a different level from Platform A

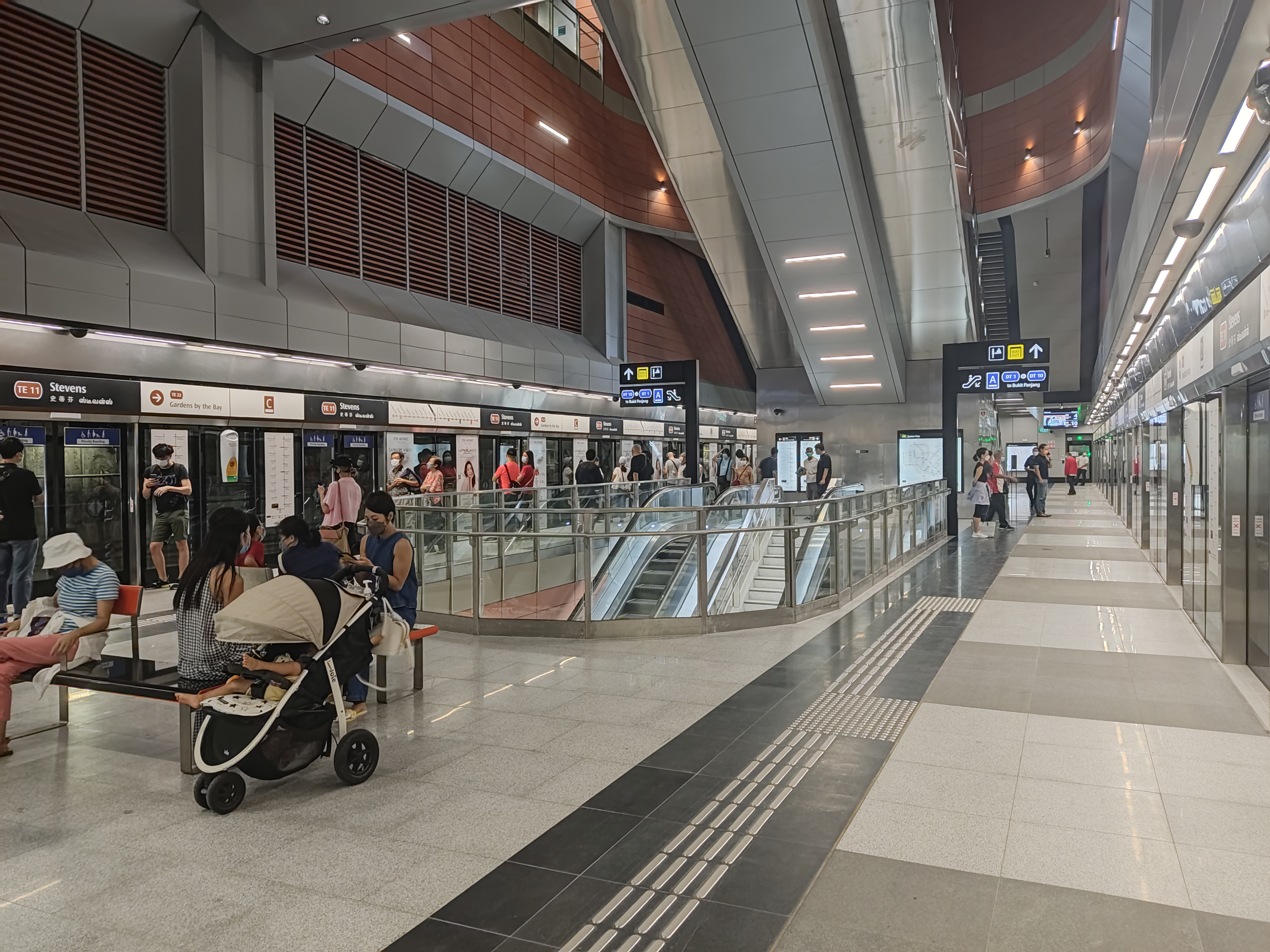
TEL platforms C and D

Stevens station is an interchange station on the DTL and TEL. The official station code is DT10/TE11. On the DTL, the station is between the Botanic Gardens and Newton stations. On the TEL, the station is between the Caldecott and Napier stations. Train frequencies on the DTL range from 2 to 5 minutes, while train frequencies on the TEL range from 3 to 6 minutes.

Located at the junction of Bukit Timah Road and Stevens Road, the station is next to the Wayang Satu Flyover and the Bukit Timah Canal. The station serves the schools of Singapore Chinese Girls’ School, St. Joseph's Institution, and Chinese International School. It is also close to the Corrupt Practices Investigation Bureau Reporting and Heritage Centre and the Tanglin Community Centre.

Until the opening of TEL station in 2022, Stevens was one of the smallest MRT stations on the DTL, due to the nearby flyover and canal. As a result, the LTA and the contractor had to implement the stacked platform arrangement, with each platform serving each direction on different levels. The station has a depth of 34.22 metres (112.3 ft). Stevens was the first station to have a set of fare gates serving each of the platforms, to allow public access for the rest of the station. This meant that the two DTL platforms did not have paid link to each other and commuters had to tap in at the right fare gate depending on their direction of travelling.

== Artwork ==
=== PIN – 23040 ===
A 24-metre (79 ft) long mosaic, PIN – 23040 by Om Mee Ai, is displayed at this station as part of the MRT network's Art-in-Transit programme, a public art showcase which integrates artworks into the MRT network. The artwork consists of hand-printed stamp patterns of nutmeg and rubber seeds in earthy shades of stone grey, timber brown and olive green, referencing the natural heritage of the area. The artwork name, PIN, refers to "Patterns in Nature", with 23040 referencing the stamp patterns. The artist intends to remind commuters of the "distinct historical and natural identity" of the locality, where many exotic plantations grew during the 19th century.

The manual stamping process is intended to reference the "childhood play of the past", while the line-up of the stamps in 480 by 48 grids represents the methodical method of crop harvesting. The artwork was manually stamped by the LTA staff, station architects and contractors along with SCGS students and staff, who were all eager to participate. Any imperfections during the stamp printing were embraced as part of the artwork. After the work was stamped, layers of translucent paint were applied until they achieved a simmering effect.

=== A Syllabus For Stevens ===
A Syllabus For Stevens

A Syllabus for Stevens, by Shubigi Rao, depicts shelves of books with a hundred engraved titles. Rao created the artwork in collaboration with students from the Raffles Girls' School. The titles, which include In Search Of The Elusive, Or How To Find Missing Socks, and Guide To Scoring A Date, are meant to reflect "the humour and intelligence of schoolgirls". A layer of limestone chalk overlay the books, an allusion to chalk on slate – this pun reflects the artist's passion for books and play on words. The work was inspired by the schools surrounding the station.

== Notes and references ==
=== Bibliography ===
- Feng, Zengkun (2017). Downtown Line: Soaring to new heights. Singapore: Straits Times Press Pte Ltd. ISBN 978-981-4747-66-0. OCLC 1003852882.
- Zhuang, Justin; Soh, Darren (2022). Art in transit: Downtown Line Singapore. Singapore: Land Transport Authority. ISBN 978-981-18-3967-2. OCLC 1342054525.
