= Napier MRT station =

Mass Rapid Transit station in Singapore

Napier TE12 纳比雅 நேப்பியர்
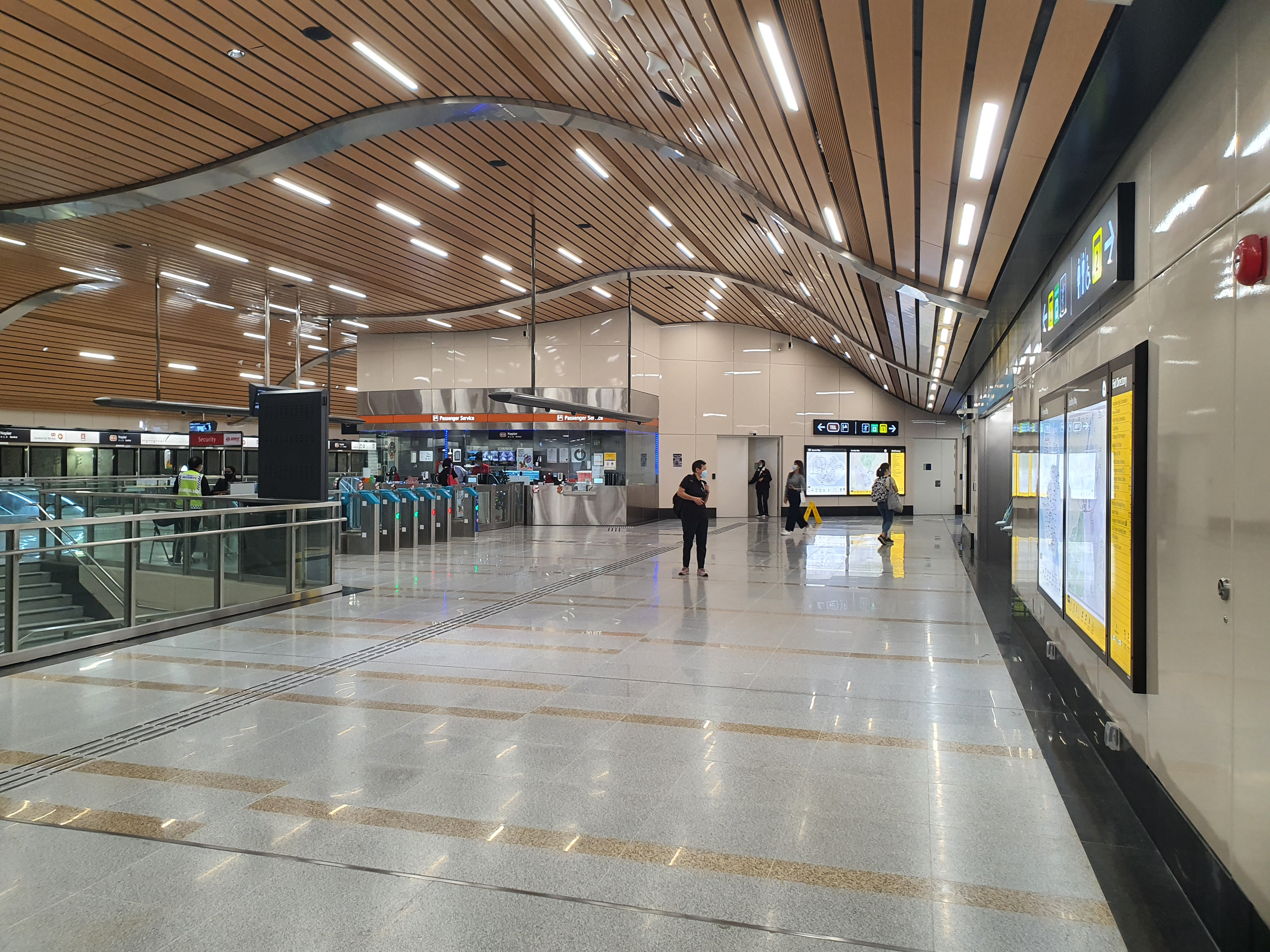
- The concourse, which leads directly to the platform

General information
- Location: 2 Napier Road, Singapore 258511
- Coordinates: 1°18′24″N 103°49′08″E
- System: Mass Rapid Transit (MRT) station
- Owner: Land Transport Authority
- Operator: SMRT Trains
- Line: Thomson–East Coast Line
- Platforms: 2 (2 stacked platforms)
- Tracks: 2
- Connections: Bus, Taxi

Construction
- Structure type: Underground
- Platform levels: 2
- Accessible: Yes

Other information
- Station code: NPR

History
- Opened: 13 November 2022; 3 years ago

Passengers
- June 2024: 3,952 per day

Services
Preceding station	Mass Rapid Transit	Following station
Stevens towards Woodlands North	Thomson–East Coast Line	Orchard Boulevard towards Bayshore
Track layout
Location
- Location within Singapore Rail central area

Napier MRT station (IPA: /ˈneɪpi.ər/ NAY-pee-ər) is an underground Mass Rapid Transit (MRT) station on the Thomson–East Coast Line (TEL). Located in Tanglin, Singapore, the station is at the junction of Napier Road, Holland Road and Cluny Road. The two exits of the station serve Singapore Botanic Gardens and Gleneagles Hospital, along with the Ministry of Foreign Affairs and the surrounding embassies.

First announced in August 2012 as part of the Thomson Line (TSL), the station was constructed as part of TEL Phase 3 (TEL 3) with the merger of the TSL and the Eastern Region Line. The station opened on 13 November 2022. Fully designed by the Land Transport Authority, the station features an Art-in-Transit Botanical Art by the National Parks Board.

== History ==
Construction progress of the station

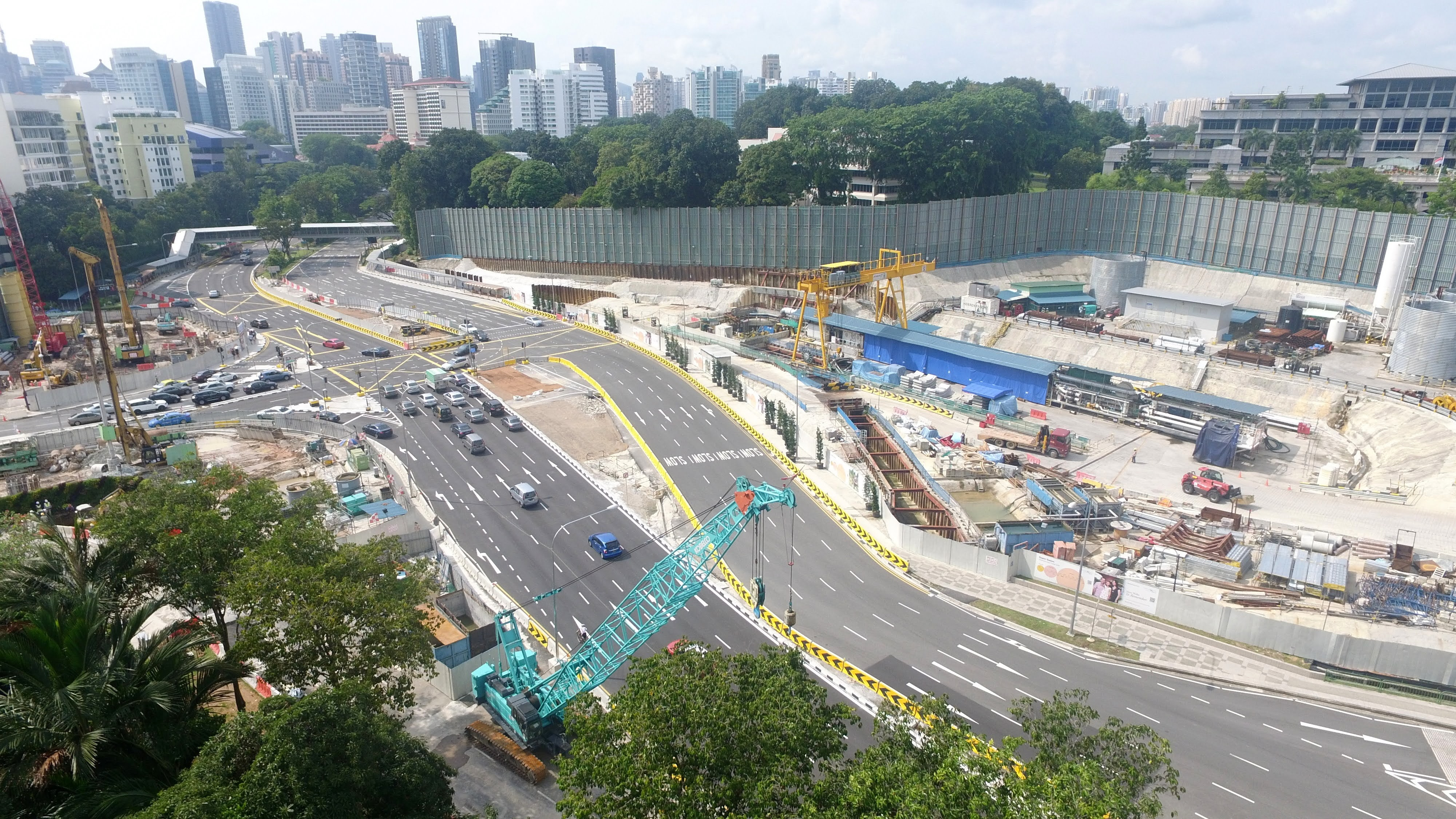
Station site in September 2015

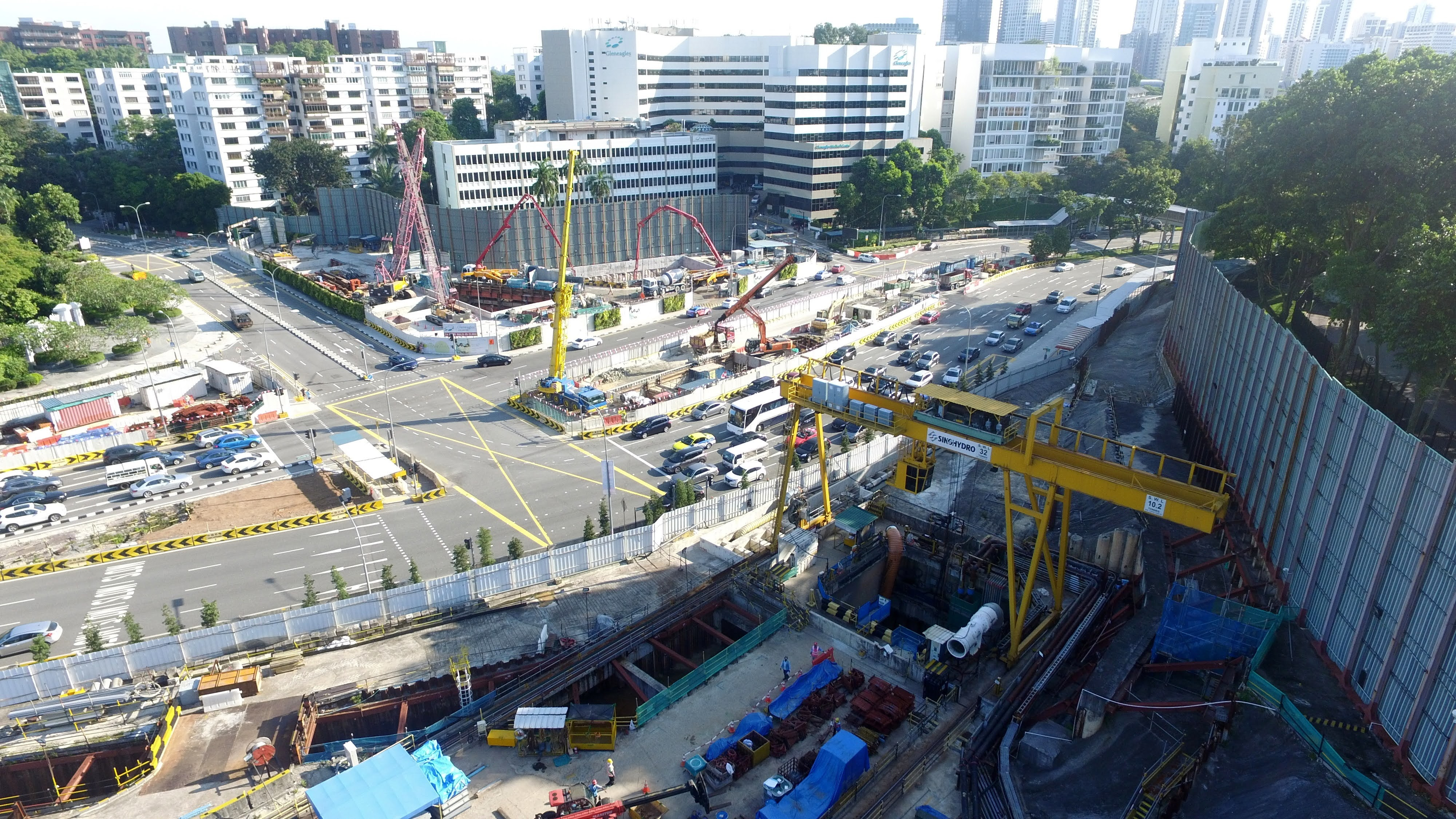
Station site in December 2017

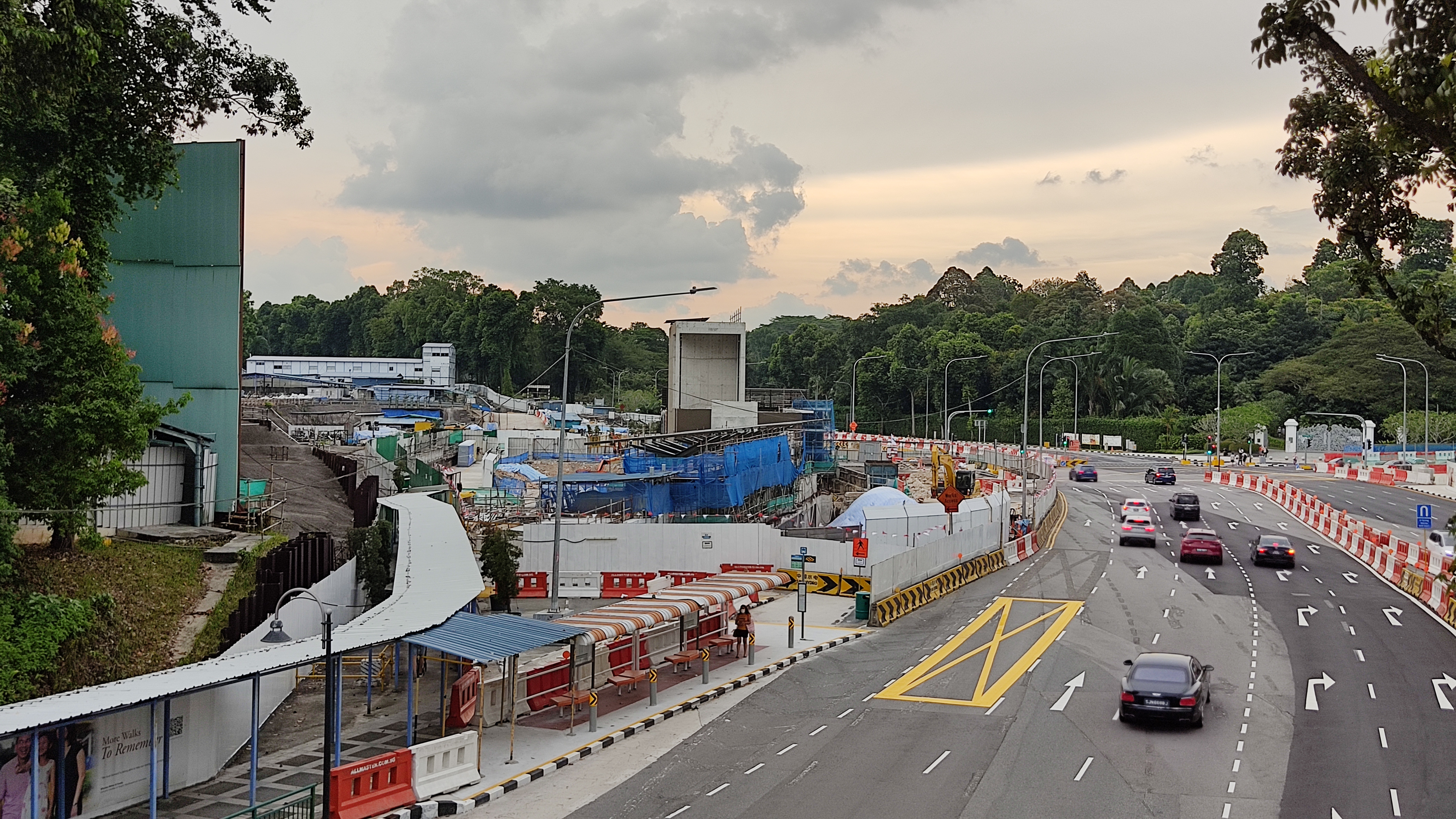
Construction site in November 2020

Napier Station was first announced on 29 August 2012 as part of the then-planned Thomson Line (TSL). Contract T217 for the design and construction of Napier Station and associated tunnels was awarded to Sinohydro Corporation Ltd. (Singapore Branch) at S$189 million (US$151 million) in November 2013. Construction started in 2014, with an expected completion date of 2021. Despite alternatives proposed in a naming poll, Napier retained its name on 27 June 2014.

On 15 August 2014, the Land Transport Authority (LTA) announced that the TSL would merge with the Eastern Region Line to form the Thomson–East Coast Line (TEL). Napier station, part of the proposed line, would be constructed as part of TEL 3, consisting of 13 stations between Mount Pleasant and Gardens by the Bay. With restrictions imposed on the delivery of material and manpower for the station's construction due to the COVID-19 pandemic, the TEL3 completion date was delayed by one year to 2022.

On 9 March 2022, S Iswaran, Transport Minister, announced in Parliament that TEL 3 would open in the second half of that year. As confirmed during a visit by Iswaran at the Outram Park and Maxwell stations on 7 October 2022, the station began operations on 13 November.

== Description ==
Napier station serves the TEL and is between the Stevens and Orchard Boulevard stations. The official station code is TE12. Being part of the TEL, the station is operated by SMRT Trains. Trains on the TEL run approximately every 3 to 6 minutes.

The station is located at the junction of Napier Road and Cluny Road. Surrounding landmarks include: Gleneagles Hospital, the Ministry of Foreign Affairs, Australian High Commission, British High Commission, United States Embassy, INTERPOL Global Complex for Innovation and the Singapore Botanic Gardens.

Due to the site's space constraints, the station has a stacked side platform layout. To reflect its proximity to the Singapore Botanic Gardens, the station features a garden wall of indoor plants. The curvilinear ceiling above the column-less upper platform was inspired by a folding leaf. This curved motif is echoed on the walls of the lower platform. The station was fully designed by the LTA.

An Art-in-Transit artwork Botanical Art by the National Parks Board depicts various species of plants, including gingers, orchids and legumes. The artwork is adapted from the drawings by the de Alwis brothers (William and George), who were botanical artists commissioned to help Henry Nicholas Ridley, the then Director of the Gardens from 1888 to 1912. Besides educating the public on plants, the artwork is intended to show that plants can be "aesthetically pleasing" pieces of natural art.

Platform on different levels

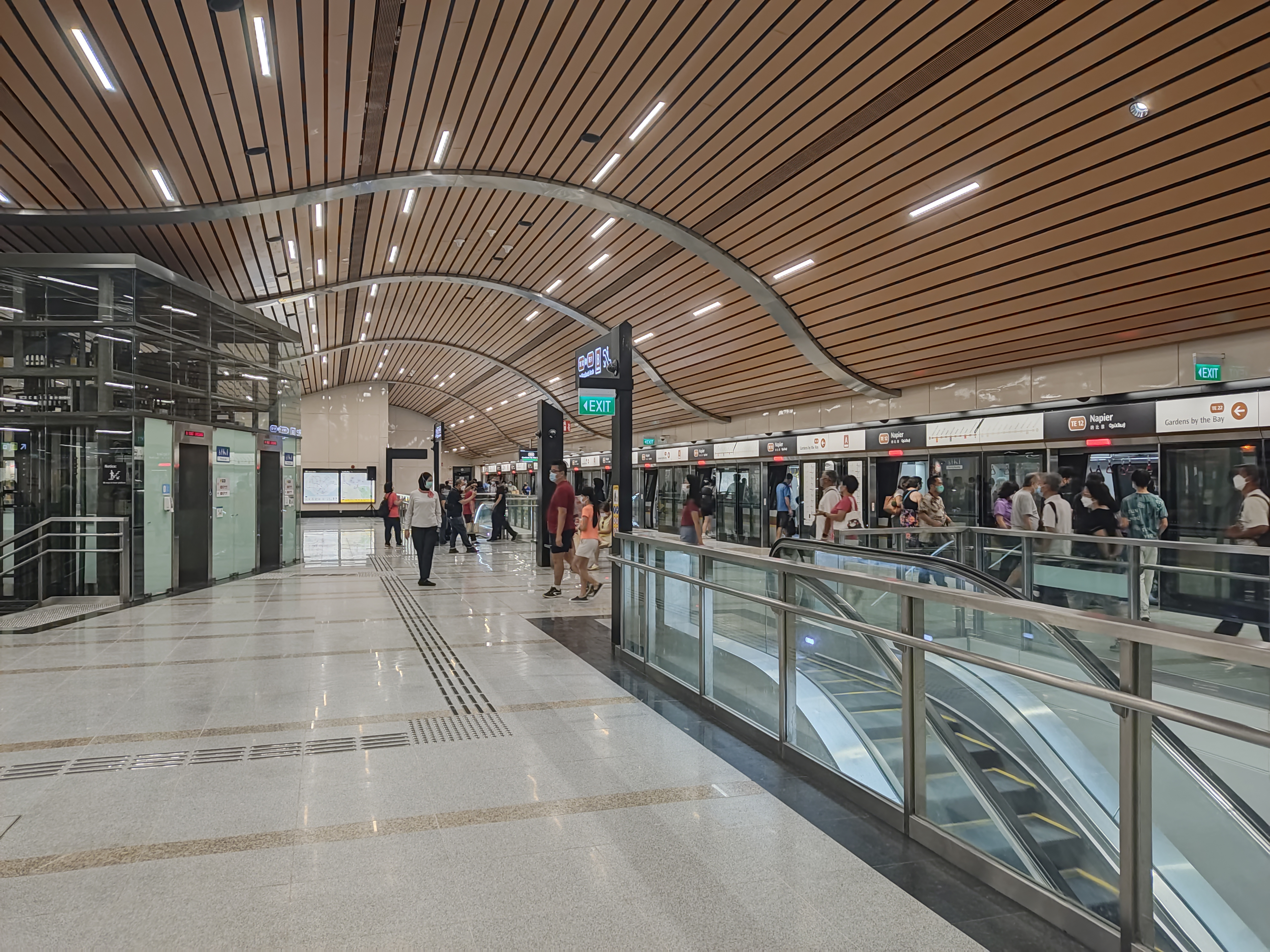
Platform A (upper)

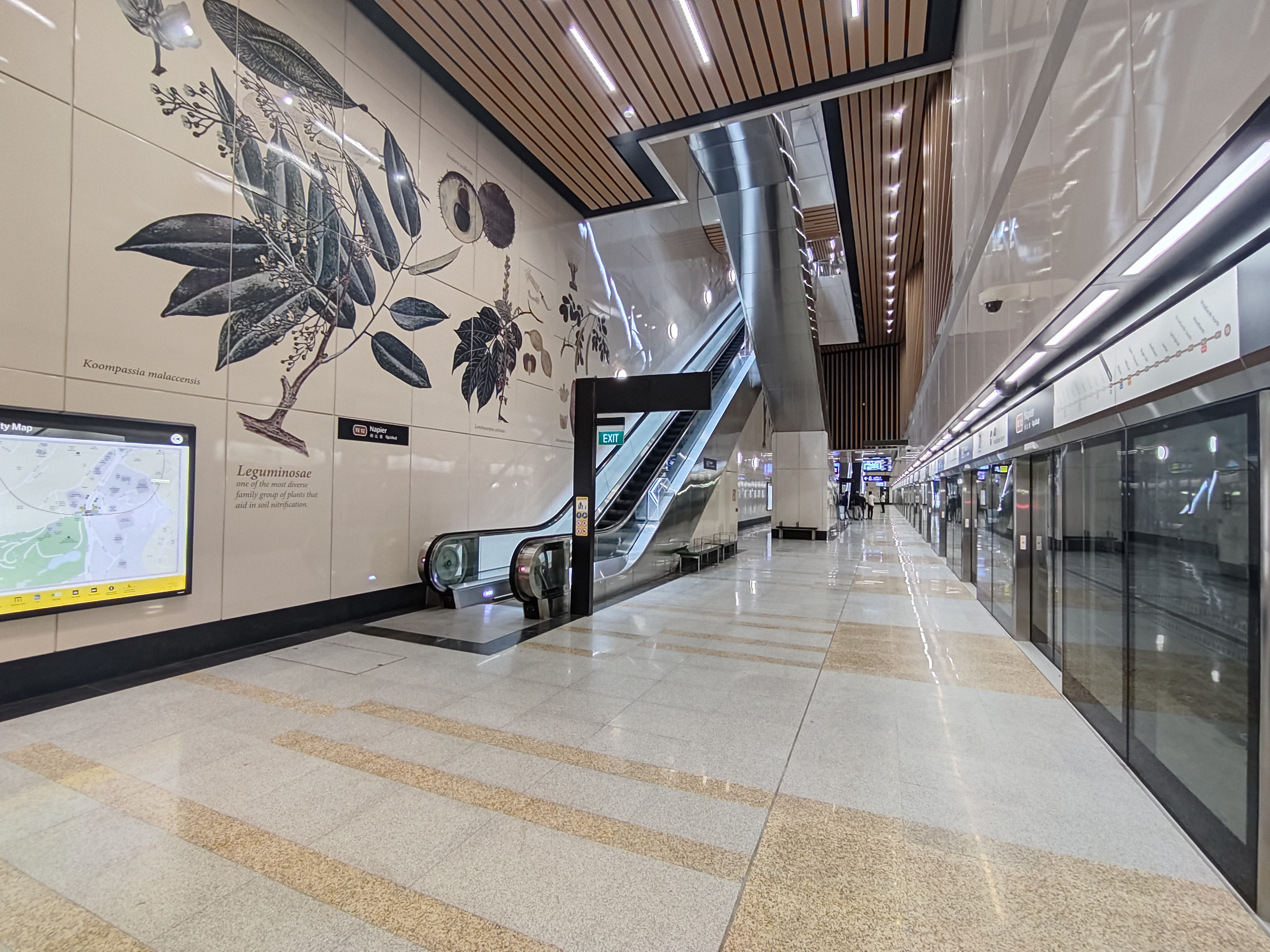
Platform B (lower)
