= Napier Road, Singapore =

Major road in Singapore

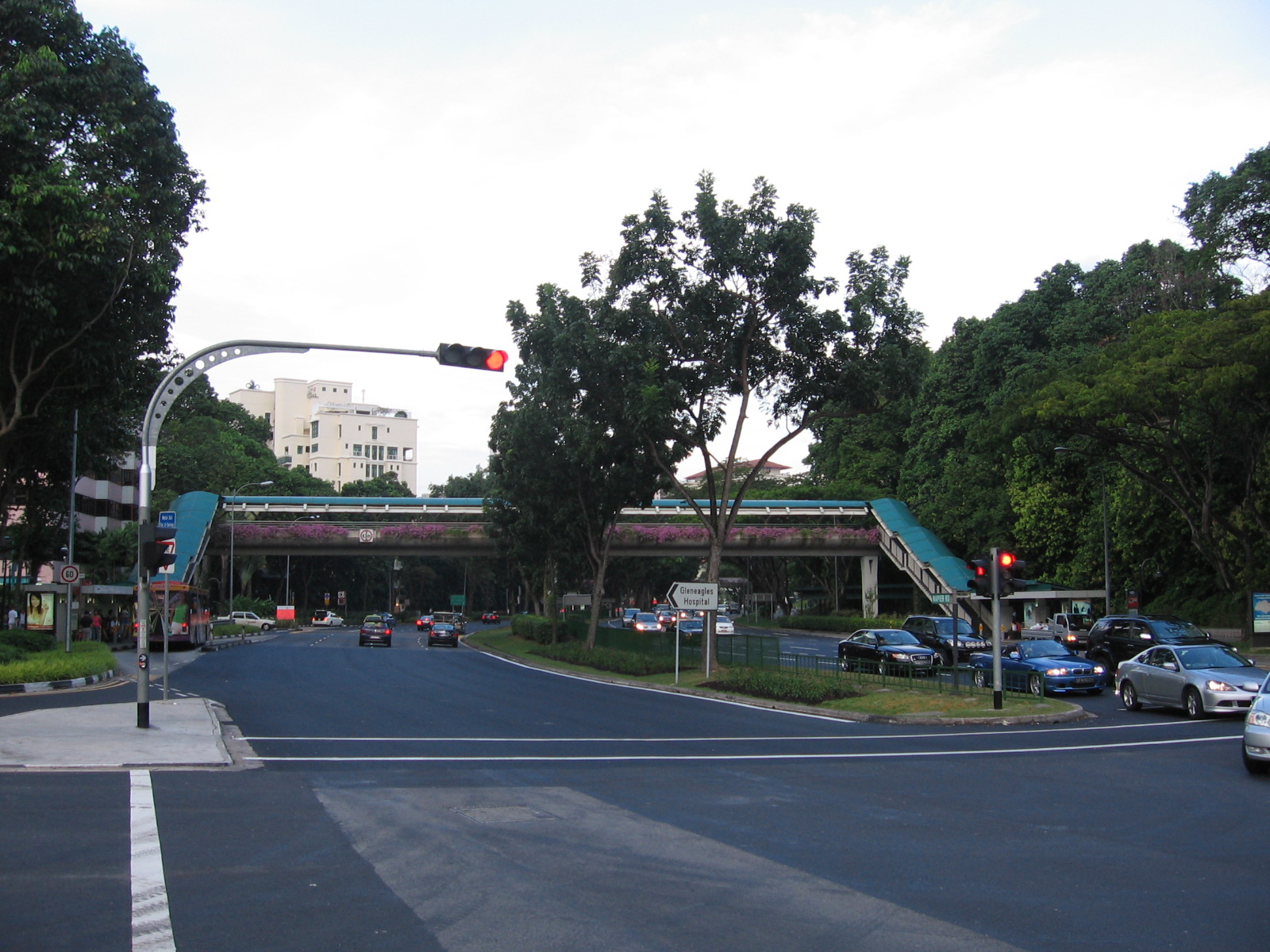
Napier Road at its junction with Holland Road and Cluny Road near the main entrance of the Singapore Botanic Gardens.

Napier Road (/ˈneɪpi.ər/ NAY-pee-ər; Chinese: 纳比雅路) is a major road located within the Tanglin Planning Area in Singapore.

The road starts with its junction with Holland Road and Cluny Road near the Singapore Botanic Gardens to the west, and ends at its junction with Tanglin Road and Grange Road to the east, near the Orchard Road shopping belt.

== Etymology and history ==
Napier Road is named after William "Royal Billy" Napier (born 1804), the first lawyer in Singapore in 1833. He arrived in Singapore in 1831 and married Maria Frances, George Drumgoole Coleman's widow.

Napier Road originally led to Napier's house, known as Tang Leng in Chinese, which he built in 1854. He was one of the founders of the Singapore Free Press and a shareholder of the Raffles Library and Museum. Later he became the Lieutenant Governor of Labuan because of his friendship with Sir James Brooke (1803-1868). He retired in 1857.

== Landmarks ==
The prominent landmarks located along Napier Road include:

- Australian High Commission
- British Council
- British High Commission
- Embassy of the United States of America
- Gleneagles Hospital
- Gleneagles Medical Centre
- Ministry of Foreign Affairs
- Napier MRT station
- Singapore Botanic Gardens
- Former Tanglin Police Station
- Tanglin Post Office
- INTERPOL Global Complex for Innovation (IGCI)
