= Island platform =

Railway platform placed between two railway tracks

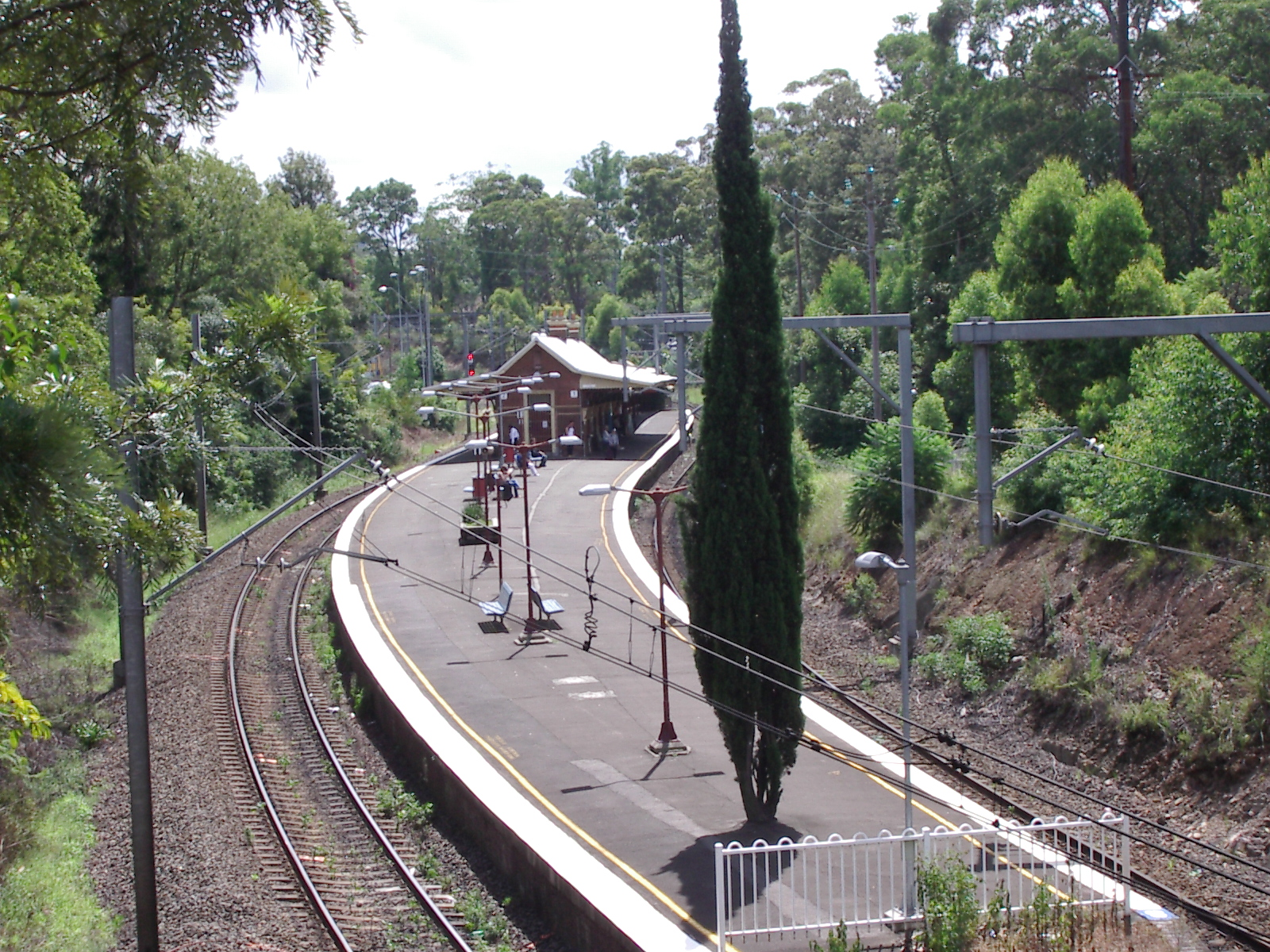
Beecroft railway station in Sydney, Australia, is an island-platform station in the middle of a reverse curve. This platform is accessed by an underpass.

An island platform (also center platform in American English or centre platform in British English) is a station layout arrangement where a single platform is positioned between two tracks within a railway station, tram stop or transitway interchange. Island platforms are sometimes used between the opposite-sense tracks on twin-track route stations as they are cheaper and occupy less area than other arrangements. They are also useful within larger stations, where local and express services for the same sense of travel can be accessed from opposite sides of the same platform instead of side platforms on either side of the tracks, simplifying and speeding transfers between the two tracks.

The historical use of island platforms depends greatly upon the location. In the United Kingdom the use of island platforms on twin-track routes is relatively common when the railway line is in a cutting or raised on an embankment, as this makes it easier to provide access to the platform without walking across the tracks.

== Advantages and tradeoffs ==
Island platforms are necessary for any station with many through platforms. There are also advantages to building small two-track stations with a single island platform instead of two side platforms. Island platforms allow facilities such as shops, toilets and waiting rooms to be shared between both tracks rather than being duplicated or present only on one side. An island platform makes it easier for disabled travellers to change services between tracks or access facilities. If the tracks are above or below the entrance level, the station needs only one staircase and one elevator or ramp to allow step-free access to the platforms. If the tracks are at the same level as the entrance, this instead creates a disadvantage; a side platform arrangement allows one platform to be adjacent to the entrance, whereas an island platform arrangement requires both tracks to be accessed by a bridge or underpass.

If an island platform is not wide enough to cope with passenger numbers, typically as they increase, overcrowding can risk people being pushed onto the tracks. In some cases, entry to the station is restricted at busier times to reduce risk. Examples of stations where a narrow island platform has caused safety issues include Clapham Common and Angel (rebuilt in 1992) on the London Underground, Union (rebuilt in 2014) on the Toronto subway, and Umeda on the Osaka Municipal Subway.

An island platform requires the tracks to diverge around the centre platform, and extra width is required along the right-of-way on each approach to the station, especially on high-speed lines. Track centres vary for rail systems throughout the world but are normally 3 to 5 metres (9 ft 10 in to 16 ft 5 in). If the island platform is 6 metres (19 ft 8 in) wide, the tracks must slew out by the same distance. While this requirement is not a problem on a new line under construction, it makes building a new station on an existing line impossible without altering the tracks. A single island platform also makes it quite difficult to have through tracks (used by trains that do not stop at that station), which are usually between the local tracks (where the island would be).

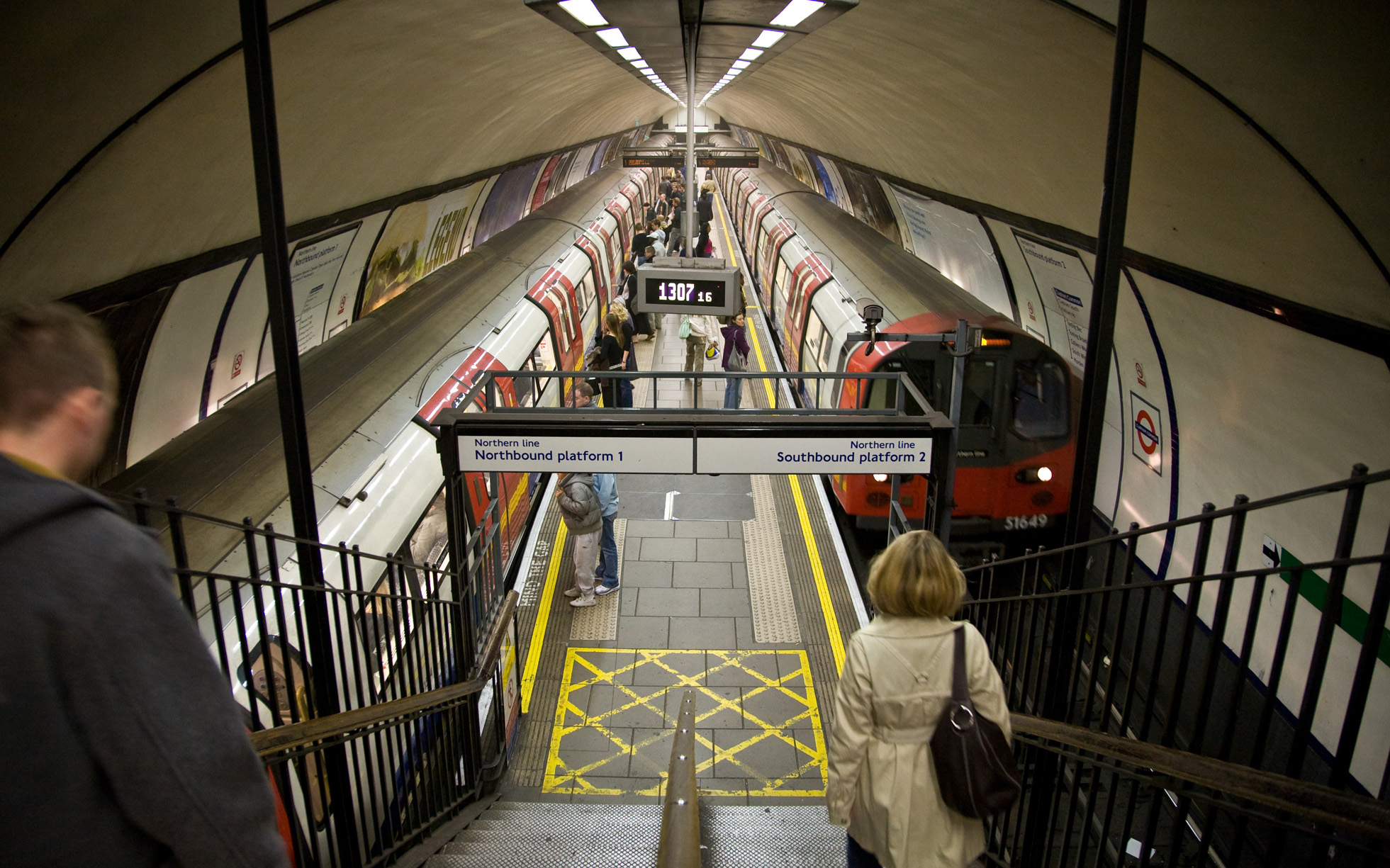
Clapham Common station on the London Underground's Northern line

A common configuration in busy locations on high speed lines is a pair of island platforms, with slower trains diverging from the main line (or using a separate level on the railway's right-of-way) so that the main line tracks remain straight. High-speed trains can therefore pass straight through the station, while slow trains pass around the platforms (such as at Kent House in London). This arrangement also allows the station to serve as a point where slow trains can be passed by faster trains. A variation at some stations is to have the slow and fast pairs of tracks each served by island platforms (as is common on the New York City Subway; the Broad Street Line of Philadelphia; and the Chicago Transit Authority's Red and Purple lines).

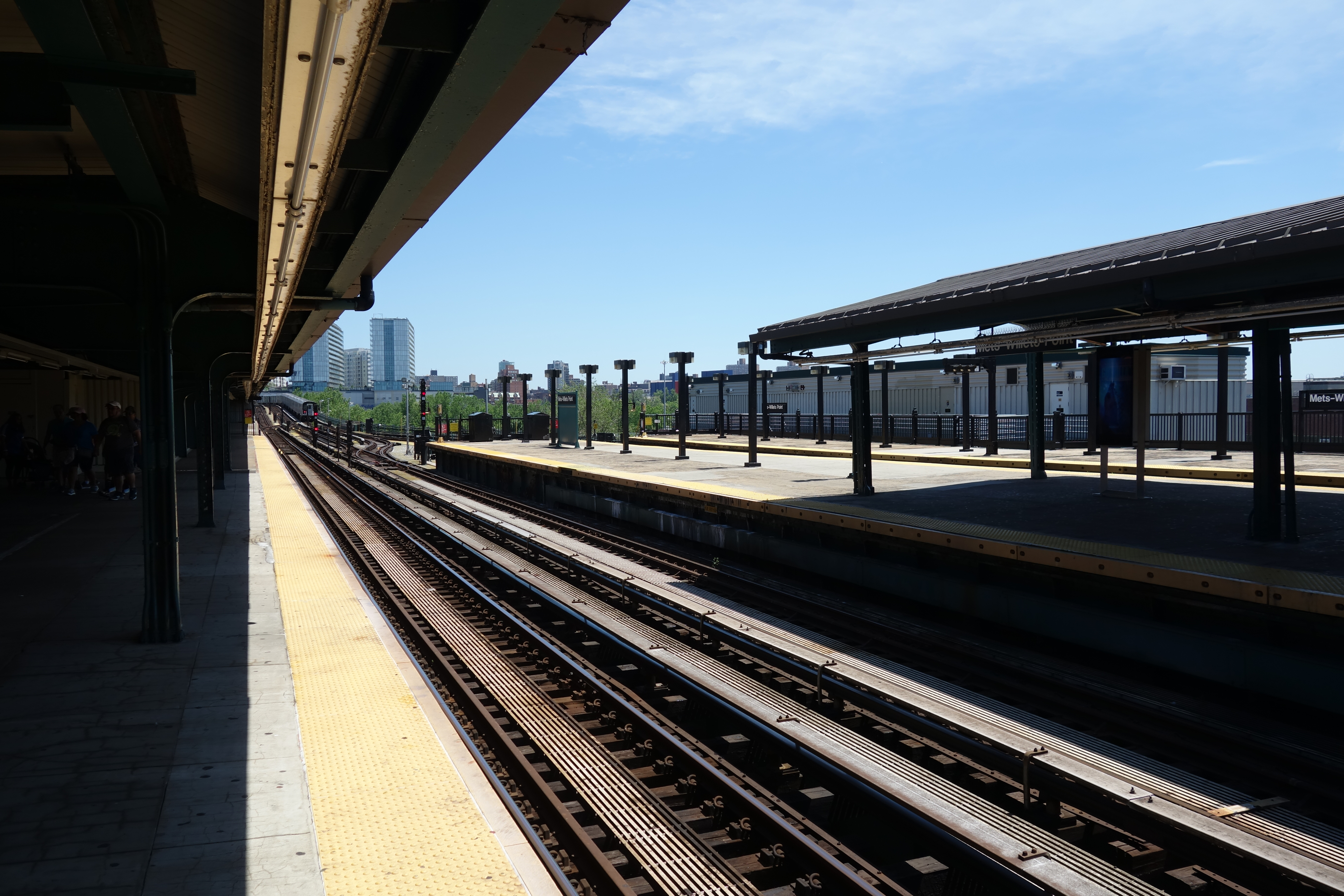
The Mets-Willets Point station on the NYC Subway's IRT Flushing Line (7 Train), showing its island platform sandwiched between its two side platforms.

A rarer layout, present at Mets-Willets Point on the IRT Flushing Line, 34th Street – Penn Station on the IRT Seventh Avenue Line and 34th Street – Penn Station on the IND Eighth Avenue Line of the New York City Subway, uses two side platforms for local services with an island in between for express services. The purpose of this atypical design was to reduce unnecessary passenger congestion at a station with a high volume of passengers. Since the IRT Seventh Avenue Line and IND Eighth Avenue Line have adjacent express stations at 42nd Street, passengers can make their transfers from local to express trains there, leaving more space available for passengers utilizing intercity rail at Pennsylvania Station. The Willets Point Boulevard station was renovated to accommodate the high volume of passengers coming to the 1939 World's Fair.

== Examples ==
Many of the stations on the Great Central Railway in England (now almost entirely closed) were constructed in this form. This was because the line was planned to connect to a Channel Tunnel. If this happened, the lines would need to be compatible with continental loading gauge, and this would mean it would be easy to change the line to a larger gauge, by moving the track away from the platform to allow the wider bodied continental rolling stock to pass freely while leaving the platform area untouched.

Almost all railway stations in India have island platforms.

=== Australia ===
In Sydney, on the Eastern Suburbs Railway and the Sydney Metro North West and Bankstown Line, the twin tunnels are widely spaced and the tracks can remain at a constant track centres while still leaving room for the island platforms. Newer stations with island platforms include Edmonson Park and Leppington. Older stations include Milsons Point, and all stations between Waitara and Artamon on the T1 North Shore Line. Most stations between Flemington up to St Marys feature two pairs of island platforms, while most stations on the T6 Lidcombe and Bankstown Line contain island platforms. All stations between Turella and Panania on the T8 Airport and South Line are in an island platform arrangement (with Revesby having two island platforms), while Arncliffe, Hurstville, Oatley, and the entire Cronulla Branch (except Cronulla itself) on the T4 Eastern Suburbs and Illawarra Line are some other examples.

Examples in Melbourne include West Footscray, Middle Footscray, Albion and Tottenham on the Sunbury line, Kananook on the Frankston Line, Aircraft, Williams Landing and Hoppers Crossing on the Werribee Line, Ardeer, Caroline Springs on the Ballarat Line, Glen Iris, Holmesglen, Jordanville and Syndal on the Glen Waverley Line, and Watsonia and Heidelberg on the Hurstbridge line.

Most of Perth's railway stations are in an island platform arrangement, this is very common on older legacy lines and almost all newer built lines by Metronet. All stations on the Ellenbrook Line and the Airport Line have island platforms.

=== Canada ===
In Toronto, 29 subway stations use island platforms (a few in the newer stations on the Bloor–Danforth line, a few on the Yonge–University line and all of the Sheppard line).

In Edmonton, all 18 LRT stations on the Capital Line and Metro Line used island platforms until NAIT/Blatchford Market station opened in 2024, the only station with side platforms as of 2024. The Valley Line Southeast uses low-floor LRT technology, but uses island platforms on only two of the 12 stops, Mill Woods and Davies.

=== Singapore ===
Almost all of the elevated stations in Singapore's Mass Rapid Transit (MRT) system use island platforms. The exceptions are Dover MRT station and Canberra MRT station, which use side platforms as they are built on an existing rail line, also known as an infill station. The same follows for underground stations, with the exception being Braddell MRT station, Bishan MRT station, and a few stations on the Downtown line (Stevens, Downtown, Telok Ayer, Chinatown and MacPherson) and the Thomson-East Coast line (Napier, Maxwell, Shenton Way and Marina Bay)

=== United States ===
In southern New Jersey and Philadelphia, PATCO uses island platforms at 13 of its 14 stations to facilitate one-person train operation; the exception is Franklin Square station, which reopened in 2025 with two side platforms because the tracks spread apart there to reach the outer sides of the Benjamin Franklin Bridge.

The NYC Subway has many stations with island platforms, including all of the Second Avenue Subway stations.

== Unused sides of island platforms ==
Sometimes when the track on one side of the platform is unused by passenger trains, that side may be fenced off. Examples include Hurlstone Park, Lewisham, Sydney and Yeronga, Brisbane.

In New York City's subway system, unused sides are located at Bowling Green as well as every express station without express service, such as Pelham Parkway on the IRT Dyre Avenue line. In Jersey City, the Newport PATH station has the same configuration as Bowling Green—one side platform and one island platform.

On the Tokyo Metro, the Ginza Line has a side platform and an island platform at Nihombashi. Likewise, the Namba and Minami-morimachi stations on the Osaka Metro have similar configurations. On JR East, the Yokosuka Line platforms at Musashi-Kosugi feature a similar setup following a new side platform opening in December 2022.

Some stations of the Glasgow Subway have one island platform and one side platform (Hillhead, Buchanan Street, and Ibrox).

In Wellington, New Zealand, unused sides can be found at two stations on the Hutt Valley Line: Waterloo and Petone. Waterloo's island platform was reconfigured to be the down side platform when the station was extensively rebuilt in the late 1980s, with the unused side now facing onto a bus bay. Petone's island platform served the up main line and the suburban loop line until the suburban loop was lifted in the early 1990s. The unused platform now faces onto the station's park-and-ride carpark.

== Gallery ==
Island platforms around the world

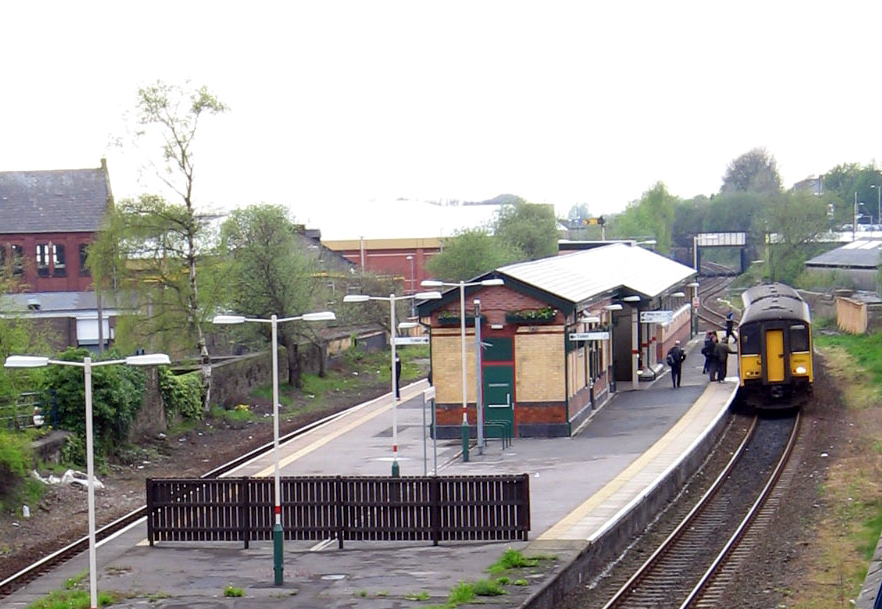
Ashton-under-Lyne station, an island-platformed station in England

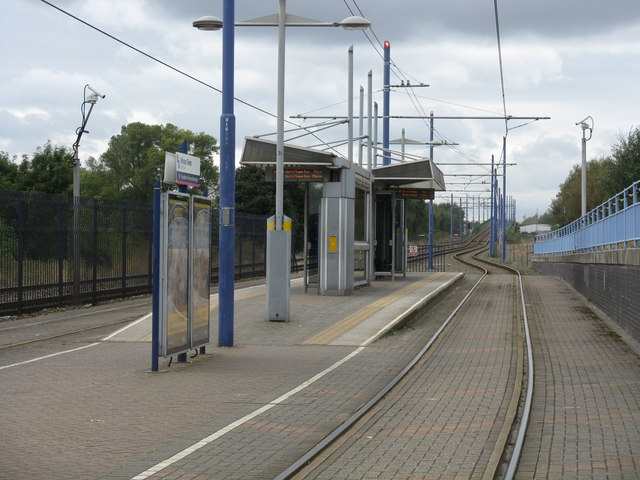
Island platform tram stop at Winson Green Outer Circle on the West Midlands Metro, in England

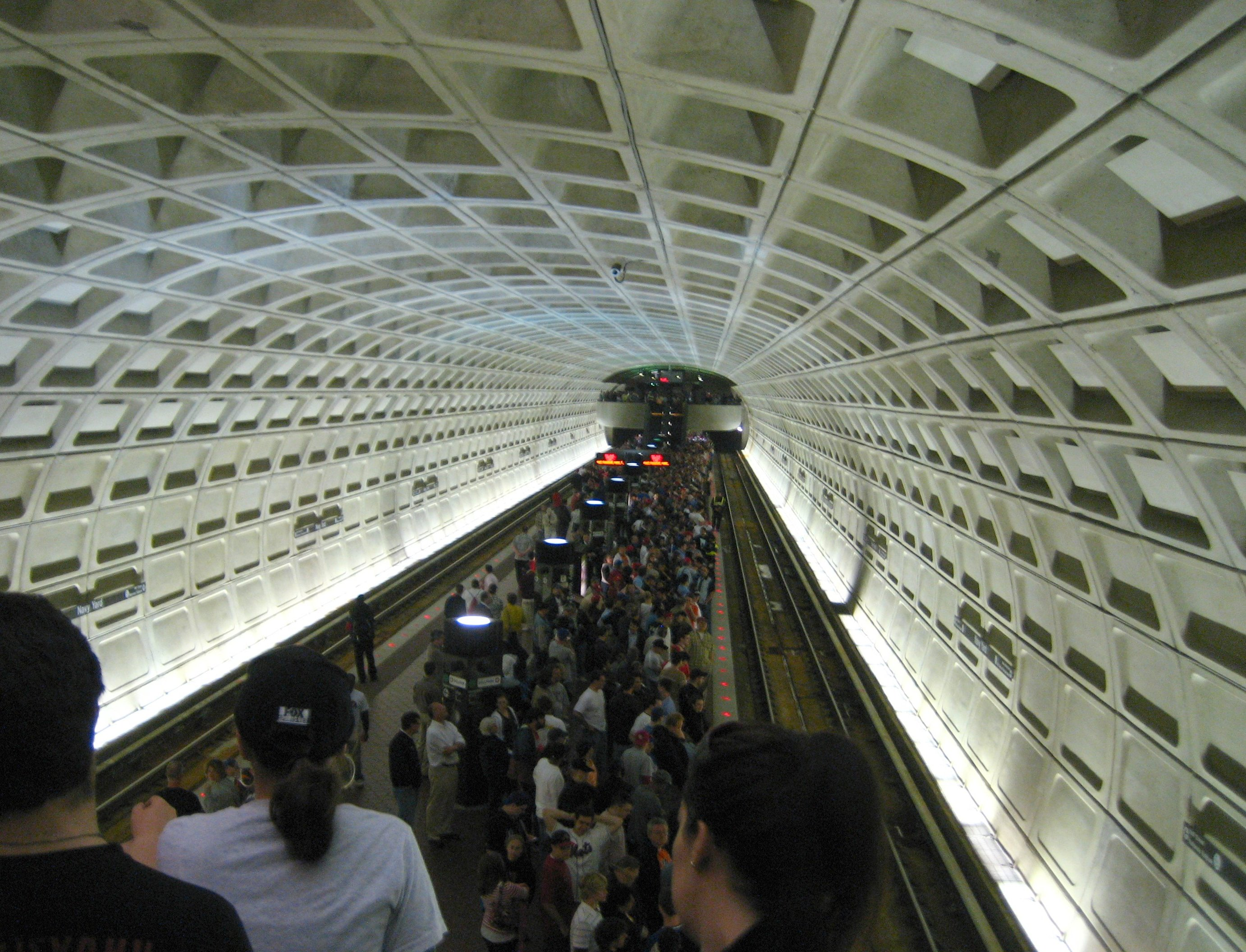
Navy Yard–Ballpark station on the Washington Metro Green Line after a baseball game at Nationals Park

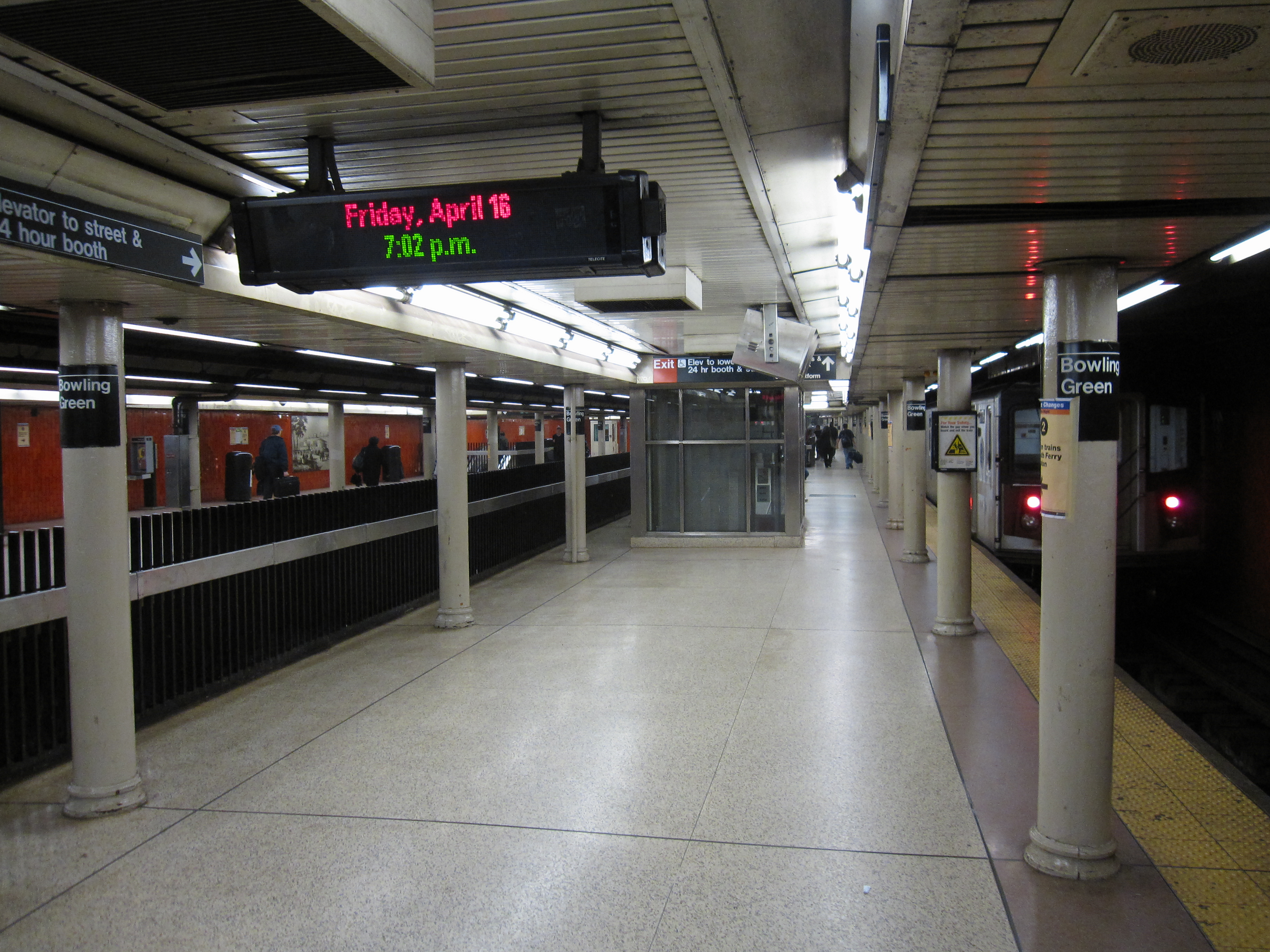
Island platform at Bowling Green station on the New York City Subway with one side fenced off

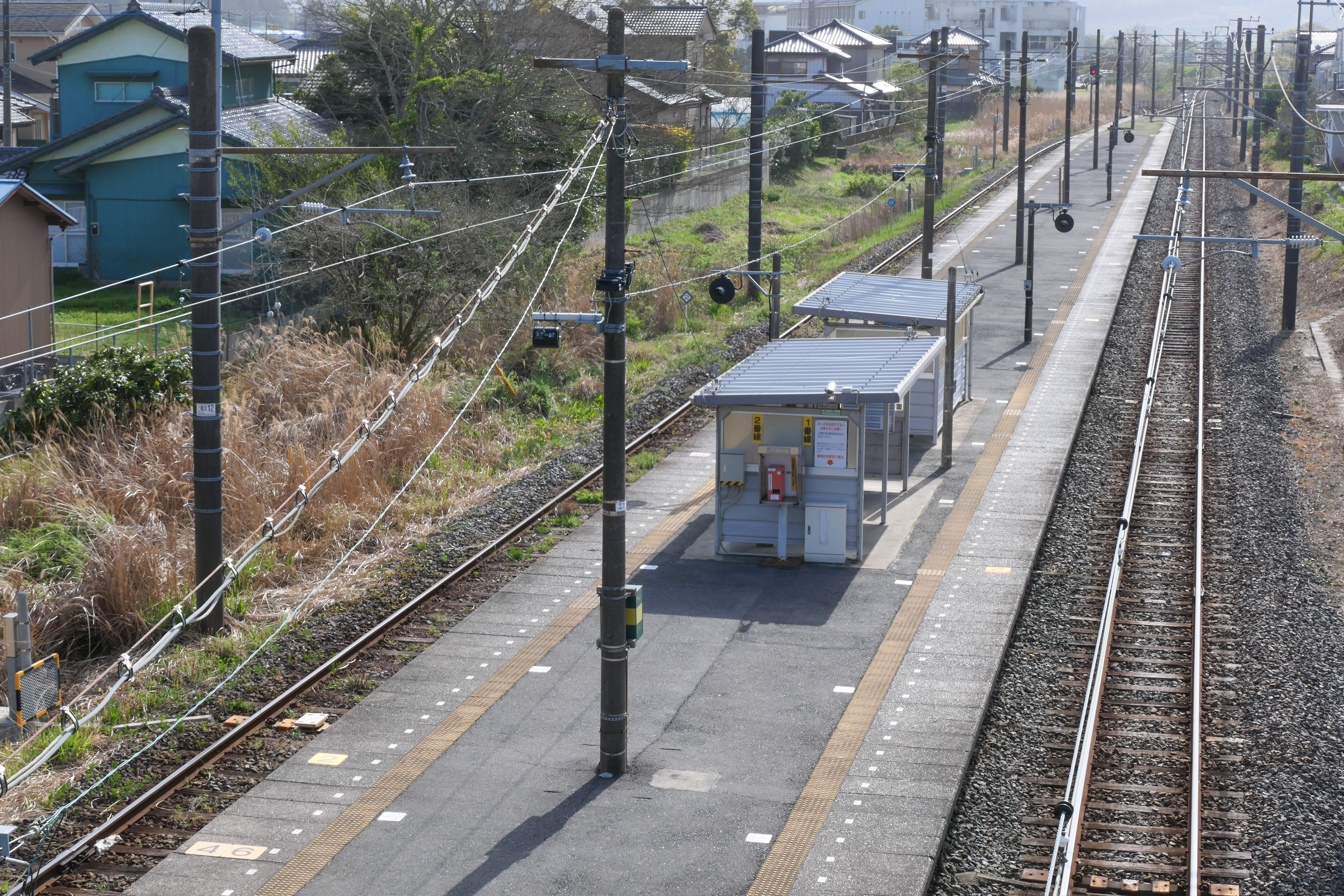
An example of a basic island platform in Japan. Ōto Station on the Narita Line.

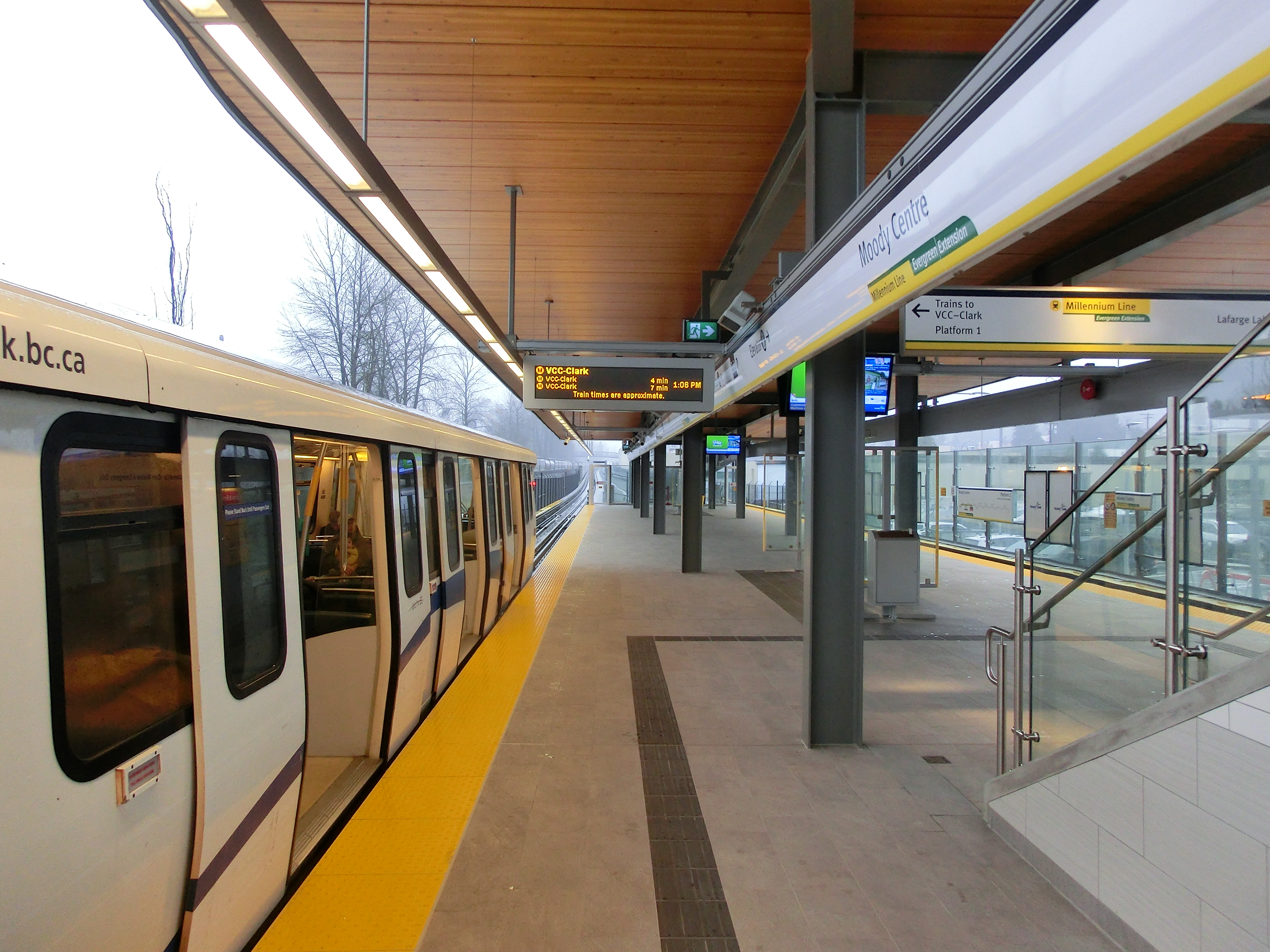
Moody Centre station, an island-platformed SkyTrain station in Metro Vancouver, British Columbia

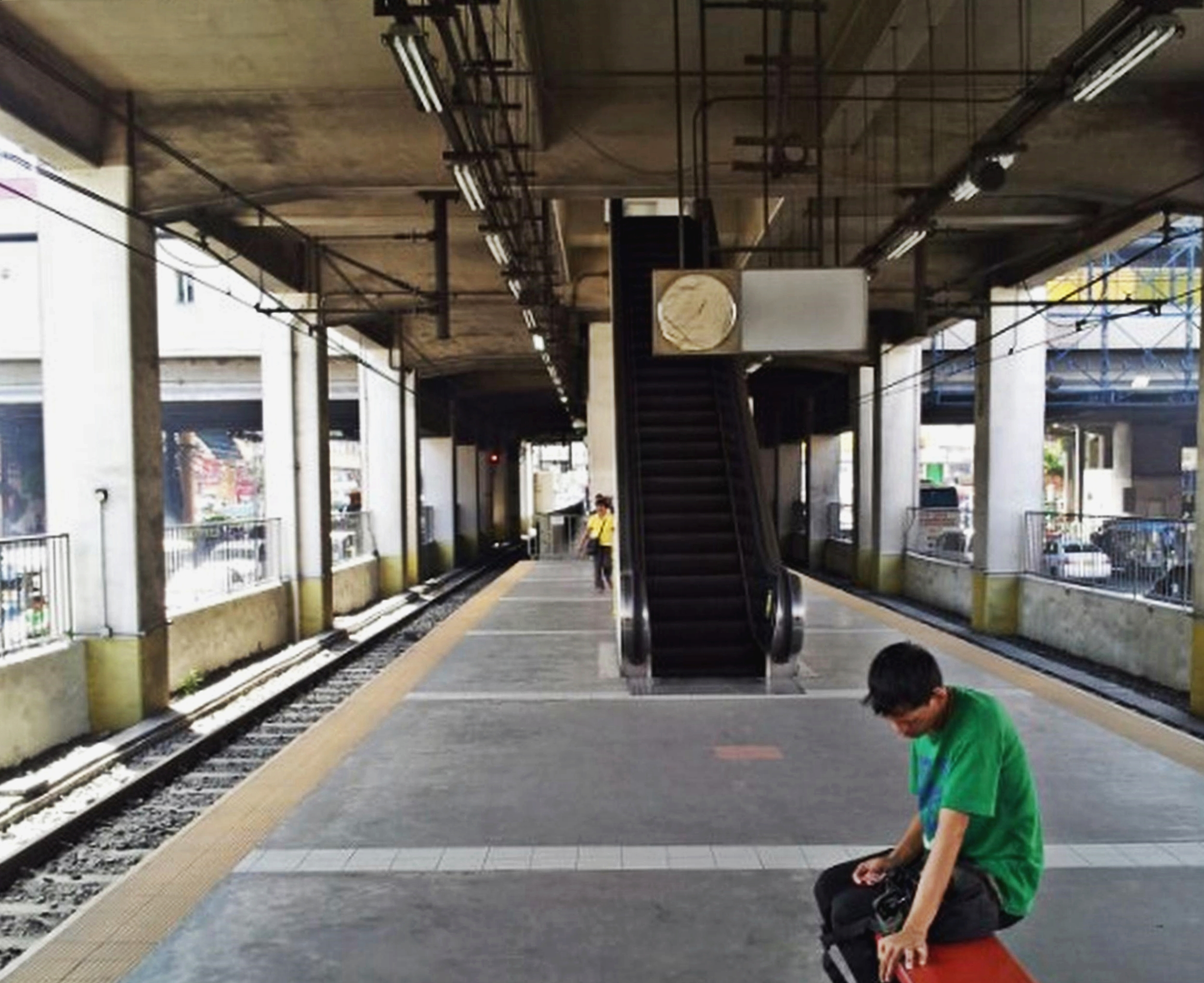
Taft Avenue station, one of the few island platforms in the Manila Metro Rail Transit System Line 3

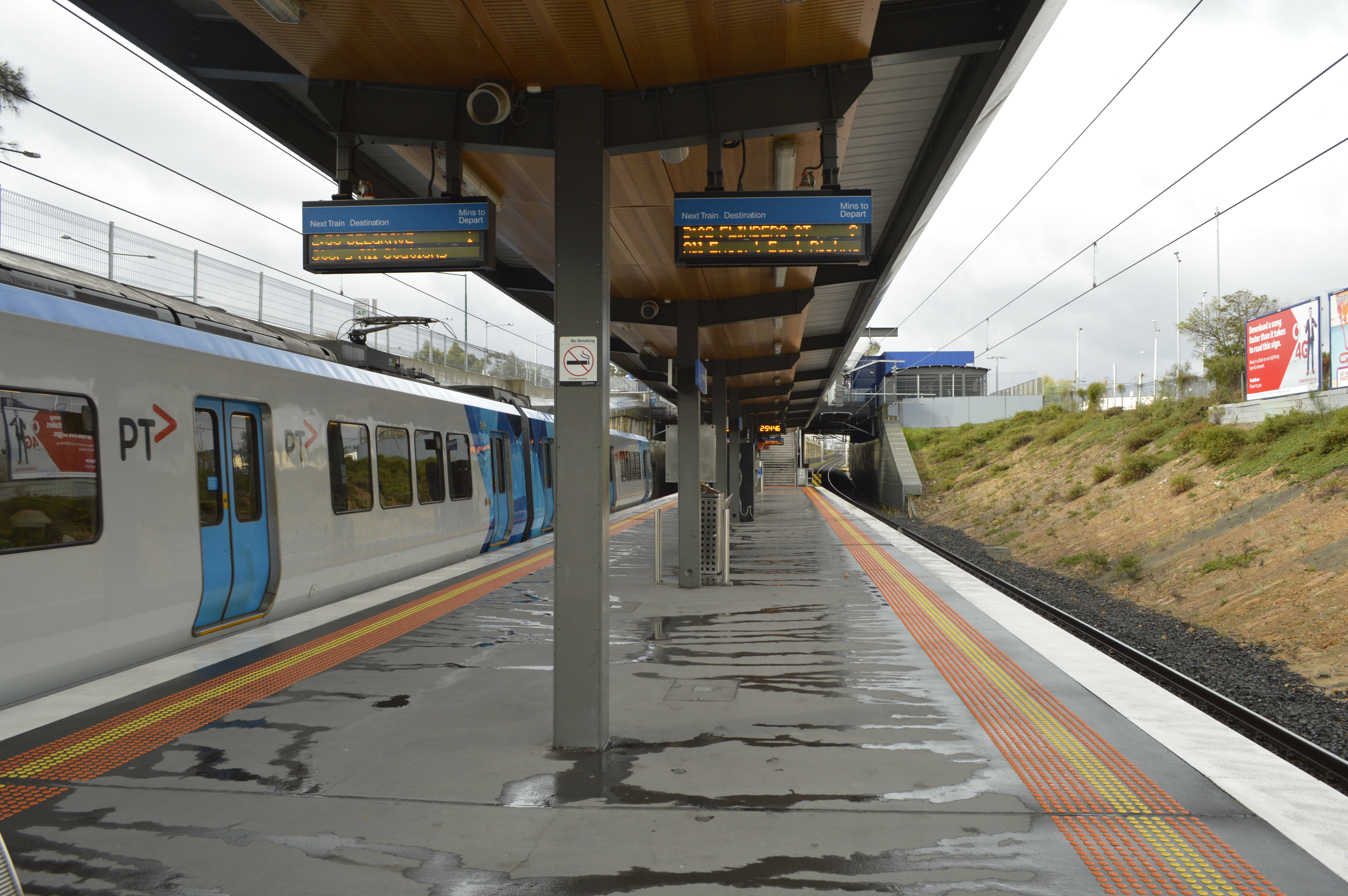
Nunawading station on the Belgrave and Lilydale lines in Melbourne, Australia.

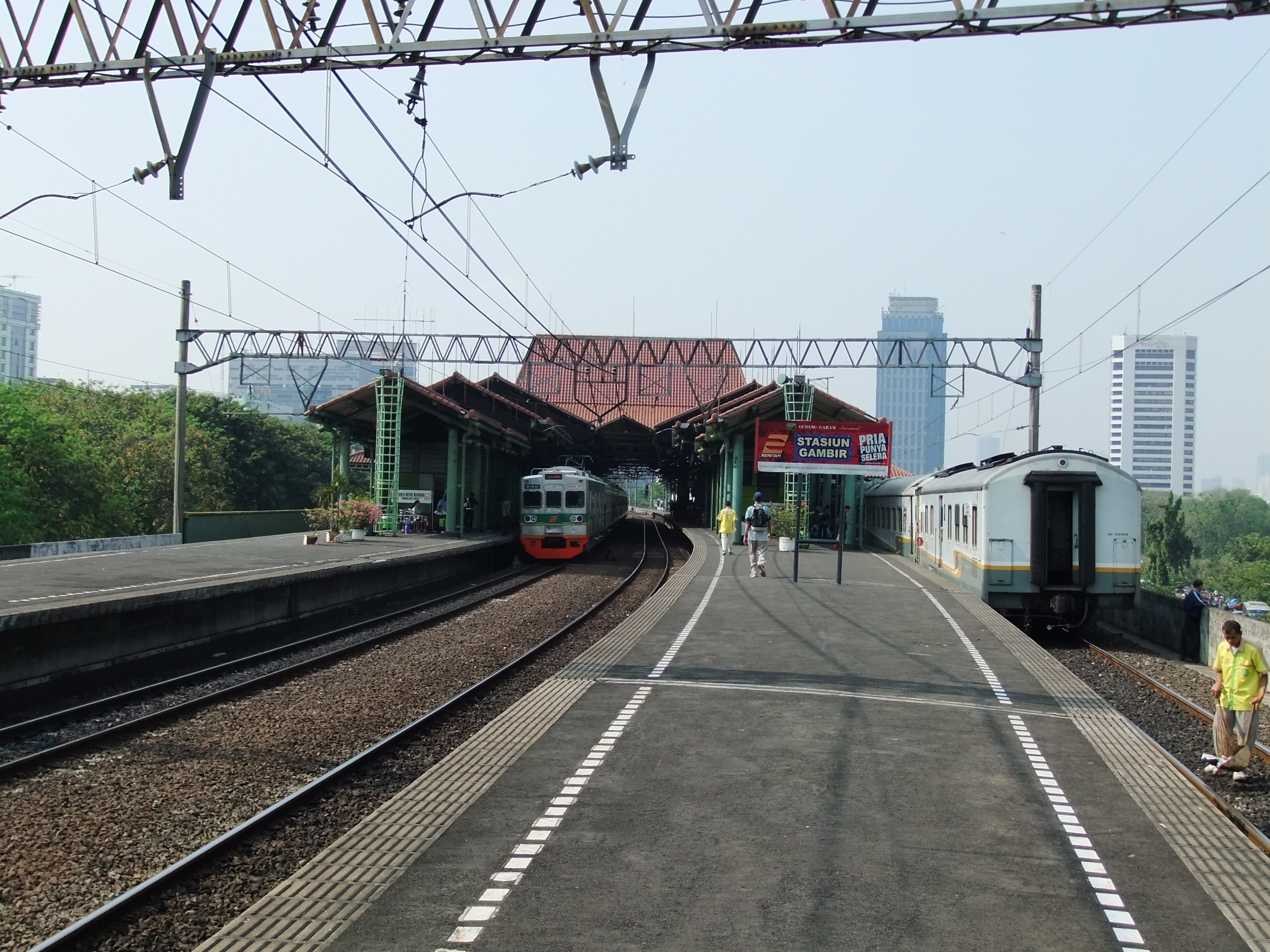
Gambir railway station is an island-platformed railway station in Jakarta, Indonesia.

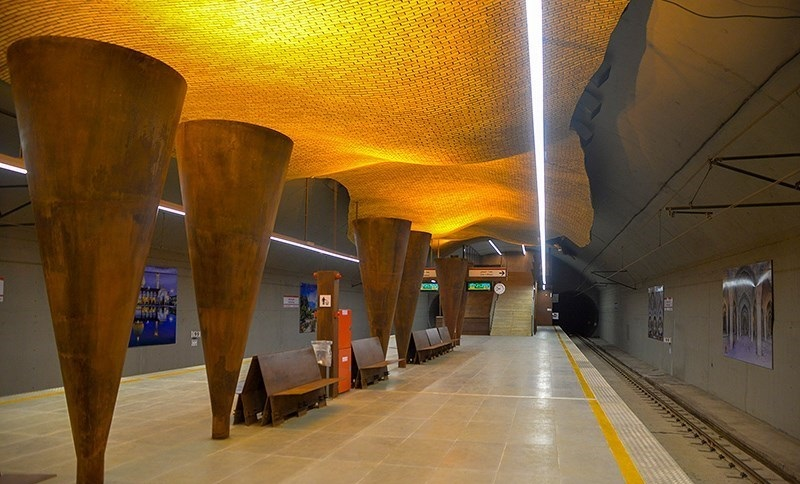
Island platform at Vakil al-Raaya metro station in Shiraz, Iran

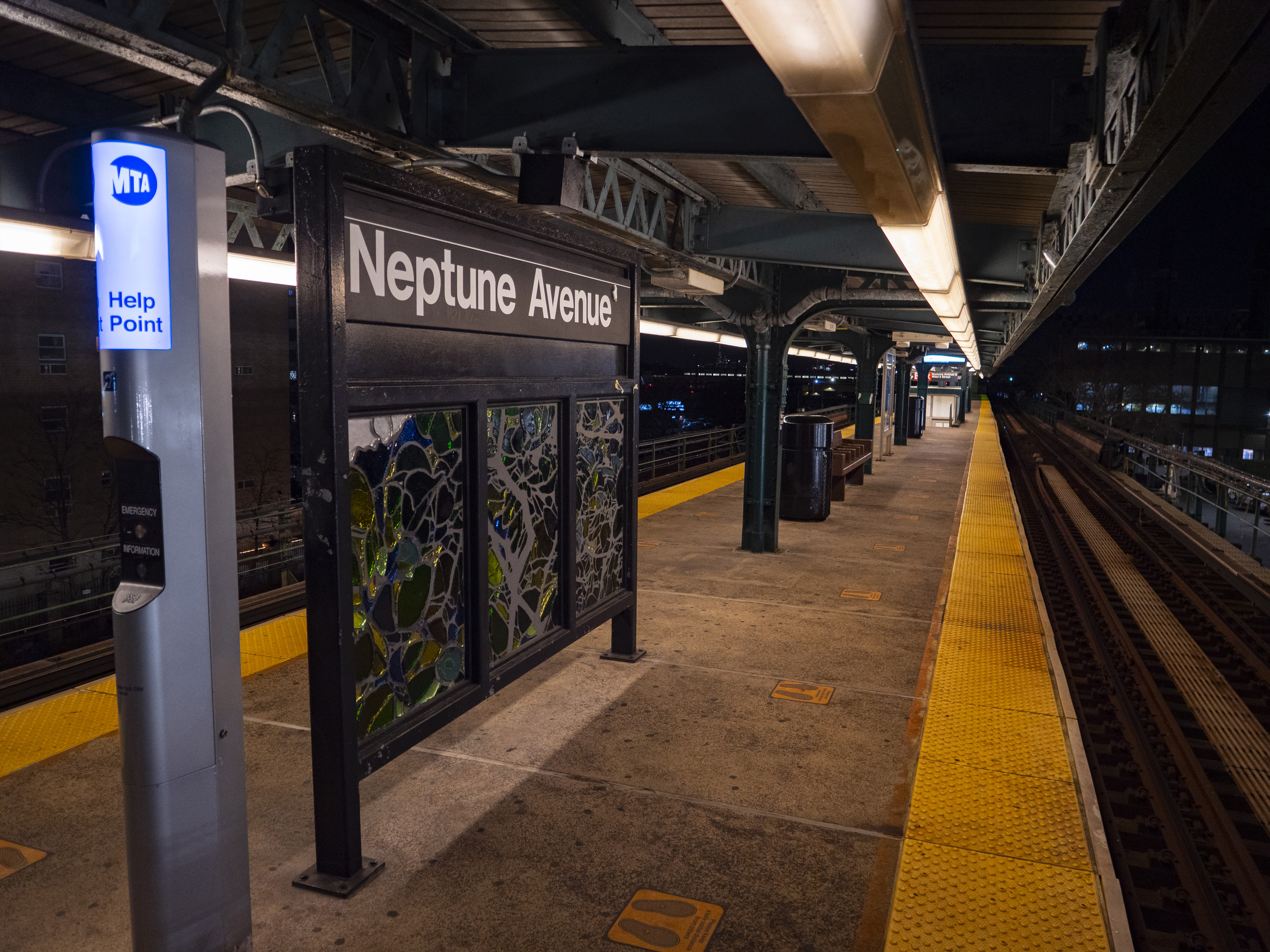
Neptune Avenue station on the New York City Subway is one example of an elevated island platform.

== See also ==
- Platform height
- Railway platform
- Side platform
- Split platform
- Spanish solution
