= Mount Pleasant MRT station =

Future Mass Rapid Transit station in Singapore

Mount Pleasant TE10 快乐山 மவுண்ட் பிளசண்ட்
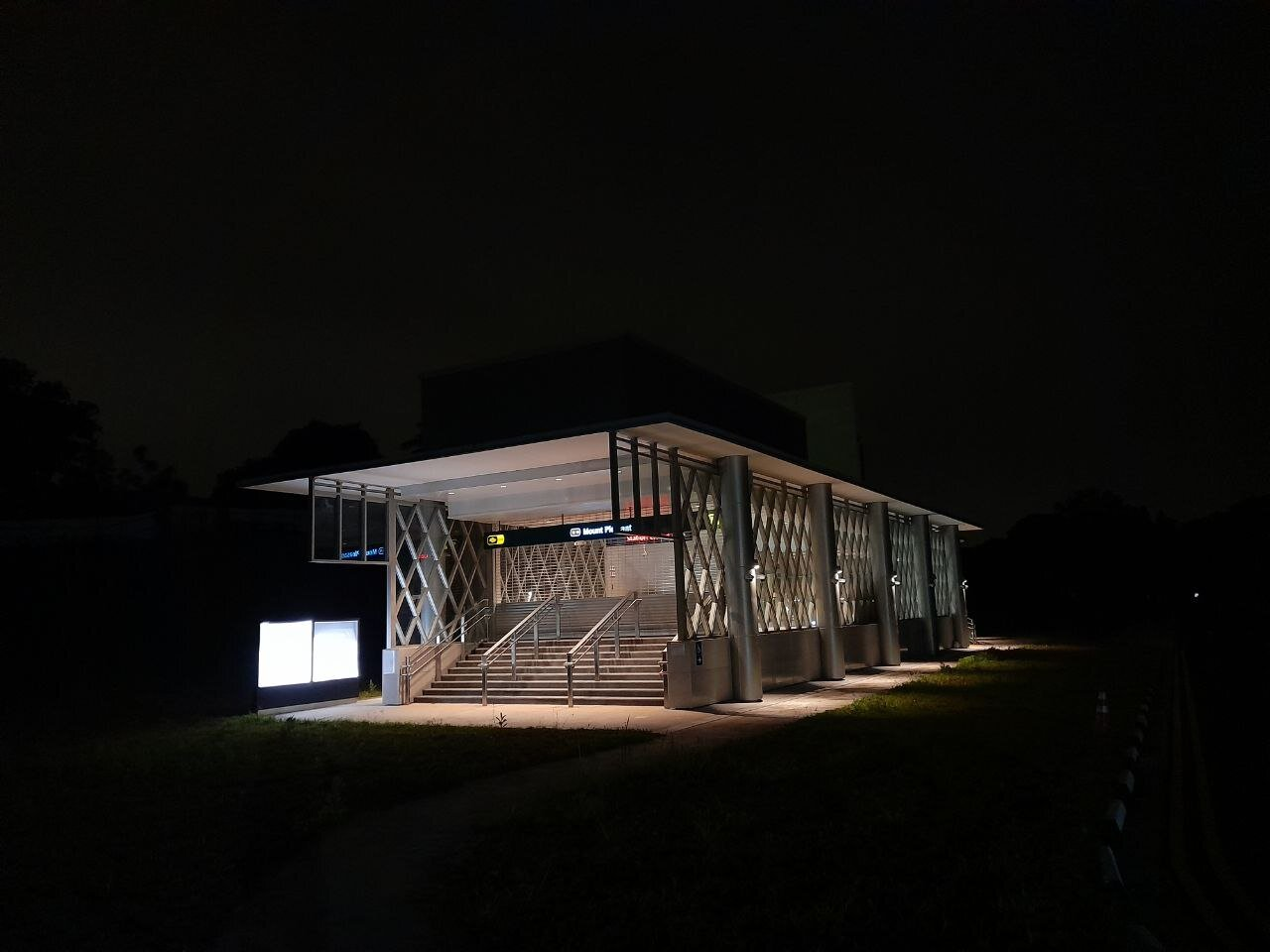
- TE10 Mount Pleasant MRT station, Exit 1

General information
- Location: 14 Denham Road, Singapore 299781
- Coordinates: 01°19′43″N 103°50′08″E
- System: Future Mass Rapid Transit (MRT) station
- Owner: Land Transport Authority
- Operator: SMRT Trains
- Line: Thomson–East Coast Line
- Platforms: 2 (1 island platform)
- Tracks: 2

Construction
- Structure type: Underground
- Platform levels: 1
- Parking: No
- Cycle facilities: Yes
- Accessible: Yes

Other information
- Station code: MPL

History
- Opening: TBA
- Former names: Whitley, Onraet, Old Police Academy

Services
Preceding station	Mass Rapid Transit	Following station
Caldecott towards Woodlands North	Thomson–East Coast Line Future service	Stevens towards Tanah Merah
Track layout
Location
- Location within Singapore Rail central area

Mount Pleasant MRT station is a non-operational underground Mass Rapid Transit station on the Thomson–East Coast Line in Novena, Singapore. Located within the former grounds of Old Police Academy, the station is planned to serve future housing developments in the area. First announced in August 2012 as part of the Thomson Line (TSL), the station was constructed as part of TEL Phase 3 (TEL3) with the merger of the TSL and the Eastern Region Line (ERL).

Initially slated to open along with the rest of the TEL3 stations, it was announced in November 2021 that the station would only open when its surrounding areas are further developed, even though it has been structurally completed. Since operations for TEL3 began on 13 November 2022, trains would skip this station and continue its journey towards either Caldecott (for trains terminating at Woodlands North) or Stevens (for trains terminating at Bayshore).

== History ==
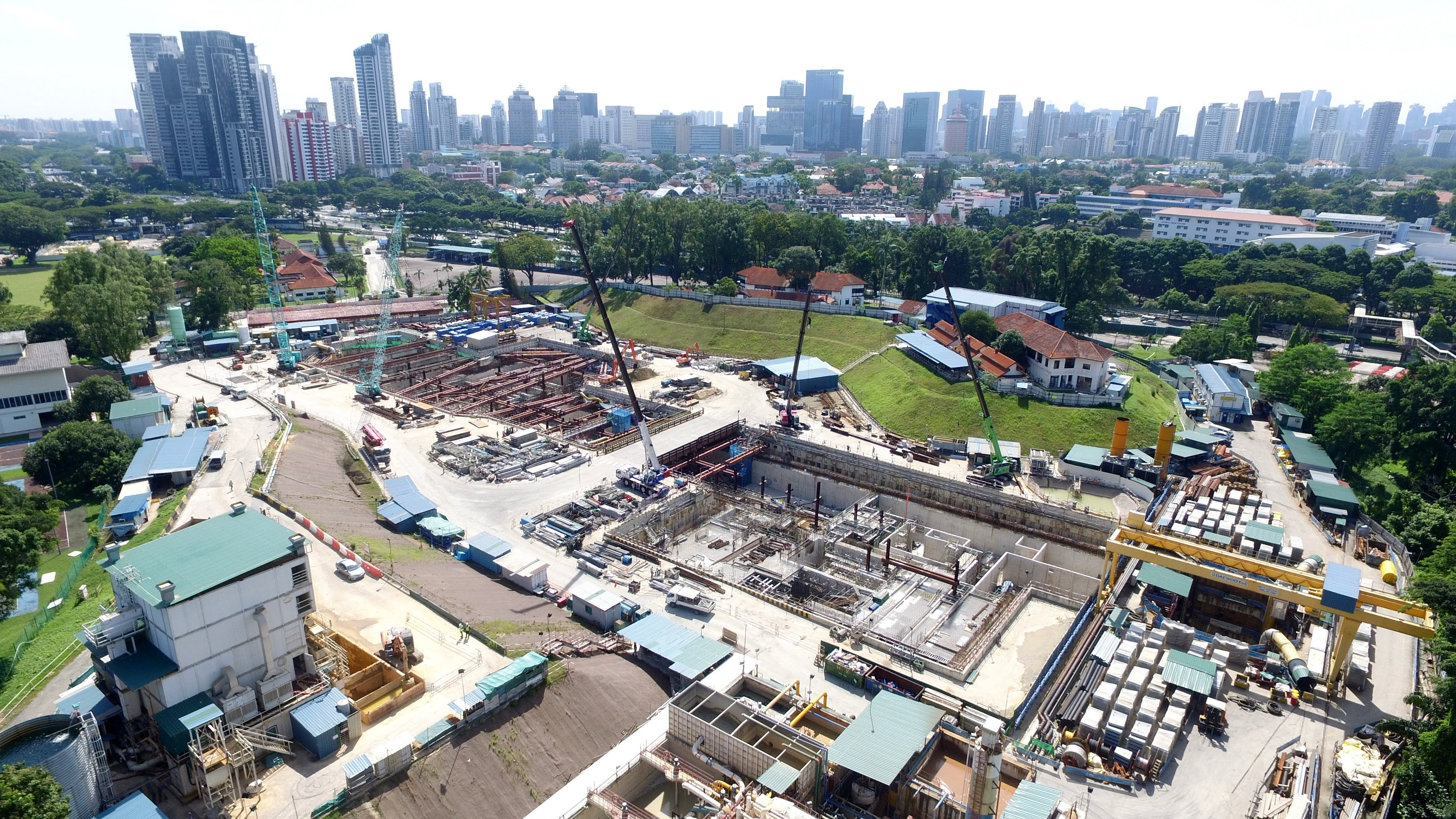
Construction works as of December 2017

Mount Pleasant station was first announced as part of the 22-station Thomson Line on 29 August 2012. In April 2014, the Land Transport Authority (LTA) awarded the contract for the design and construction of the station and associated tunnels to a joint venture among RSEA Engineering Corporation, Eng Lee Engineering Pte Ltd and Wai Fong Construction Pte Ltd (Wai Fong) Joint Venture at S$207 million (US$163.4 million). The station's construction was scheduled to begin in the second quarter of 2014, with an expected completion date of 2021.

On 15 August 2014, the LTA further announced that the TSL would merge with the Eastern Region Line to form the Thomson–East Coast Line (TEL). Mount Pleasant station, part of the proposed line, would be constructed as part of TEL3, consisting of 13 stations between this station and Gardens by the Bay. A groundbreaking ceremony was held on 24 January 2015 to mark the official beginning of the station's construction. The station's construction required minimal disruption to the surrounding developments, though some of the Old Police Academy's buildings had to be demolished during the project.

With restrictions imposed on construction due to the COVID-19 pandemic, the TEL3 completion date was pushed to 2022. On 23 November 2021, it was announced that the station's opening would be in tandem with the completion of the new Mount Pleasant housing estate.

== Station details ==
=== Location ===
Mount Pleasant station is located at the new Mount Pleasant housing estate, situated between Caldecott and Stevens MRT stations. The station is located near the Old Police Academy where the estate is located at.

=== Services ===
Served by the Thomson–East Coast Line as part of TEL3, the station is operated by SMRT Trains. Its official station code is TE10. The station is currently mothballed and will open in tandem with the future Mount Pleasant district.

The station is a designated Civil Defence Shelter.
