= Marina Bay MRT station =

Mass Rapid Transit station in Singapore

Marina Bay NS27 TE20 CC33 滨海湾 மரீனா பே
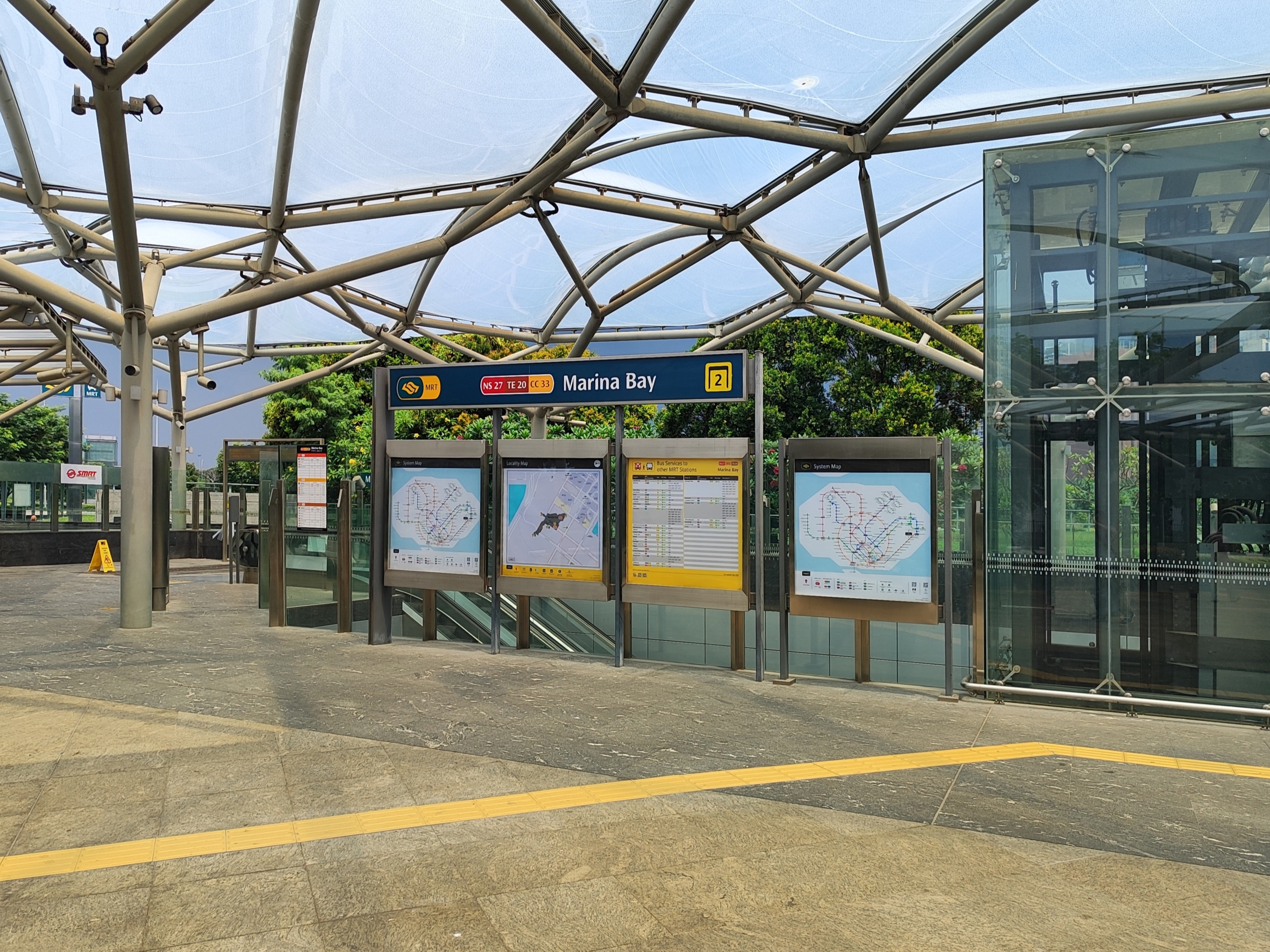
- Exit 2 of Marina Bay station

General information
- Location: 21 Park Street, Singapore 018925 (NSL); 23 Park Street, Singapore 018926 (CCL); 25 Park Street, Singapore 018929 (TEL)
- Coordinates: 01°16′31″N 103°51′17″E
- System: Mass Rapid Transit (MRT) interchange and terminus
- Owner: Land Transport Authority
- Operator: SMRT Trains
- Line: North–South Line Circle Line Thomson–East Coast Line
- Platforms: 6 (2 island platforms, 2 stacked platforms)
- Tracks: 6
- Connections: Bus, taxi

Construction
- Structure type: Underground
- Depth: 40 metres (130 ft)
- Platform levels: 4
- Cycle facilities: Yes
- Accessible: Yes

History
- Opened: 4 November 1989; 37 years ago (North–South Line); 14 January 2012; 14 years ago (Circle Line); 13 November 2022; 4 years ago (Thomson–East Coast Line)
- Former names: Marina South, Telok Ayer Basin

Passengers
- June 2024: 5371 per day

Services
Preceding station	Mass Rapid Transit	Following station
Raffles Place towards Jurong East	North–South Line	Marina South Pier Terminus
Prince Edward Road Clockwise	Circle Line	Bayfront Anticlockwise
Shenton Way towards Woodlands North	Thomson–East Coast Line	Gardens by the Bay towards Bayshore
Shenton Way towards Woodlands North	Thomson–East Coast Line Future service	Marina South towards Tanah Merah
Track layout
Location
- Location within Singapore Rail central area

Marina Bay MRT station is an underground Mass Rapid Transit (MRT) interchange station on the North–South (NSL), Circle (CCL) and Thomson–East Coast (TEL) lines in Singapore. Located in the Downtown Core district near Marina Bay, the station serves the Marina One Residences, Marina Bay Suites and the Marina Bay Financial Centre.

Marina Bay station was one of the last stations to be completed in the early phases of the construction of the MRT network, opening on 4 November 1989. It was the terminus of the NSL until the line's extension to Marina South Pier station in 2014. The station became an interchange station with the CCL upon the completion of the two-station branch extension from Promenade station in January 2012. The TEL station platforms were completed in November 2022 as part of TEL Stage 3, becoming a triple-line interchange station on the MRT network.

The station features numerous works of art as part of the MRT network's Art-in-Transit programme. An overhanging flower sculpture Flowers in Blossom II is displayed over the CCL mezzanine. The CCL platforms feature a series of photographs Train Rides on Rainy Days by Nah Yong En and the TEL station features a series of murals Walking into The Interstitial by Tang Ling Nah.

== History ==
=== North–South Line ===
The station was named Marina South in the early plans of the MRT network published in May 1982. Confirmation that the station would be among the Phase I stations (from Ang Mo Kio to this station) came in November that year alongside a name change to Marina Bay. This segment was given priority as it passed through areas that had a higher demand for public transport, such as the densely populated housing estates of Toa Payoh and Ang Mo Kio and the Central Area. The line aimed to relieve the traffic congestion on the Thomson–Sembawang road corridor.

Contract 310 for the construction of the 900-metre (0.56-mile) cut-and-cover connecting tunnels, as well as Marina Bay MRT station, was awarded to a joint venture between Gammon and Antara Koh at a value of S$96.16 million (US$44.16 million) in April 1986. The main challenges of the construction included tunnelling underneath the Telok Ayer Basin and building the station and tunnels in soft soil. Due to the soft marine clay, open excavation was not possible. Divers had to cut the 20-metre (66 ft) trenches for the MRT tunnels in zero visibility and very muddy water. A concrete base for the tunnels was then laid with the water pumped out, upon which the tunnels and the station were to be built. The tunnels were then covered with another layer of concrete before the seabed was refilled. During the construction, a World War II-era bomb was found at the work site and was safely detonated elsewhere by the Singapore Armed Forces Bomb Disposal Unit.

The station opened on 4 November 1989 and was the southern terminus of the North–South Line (NSL) until the 1-kilometre (0.62-mile) extension to Marina South Pier station opened in 2014. On 8 January 2006, this station was one of the four stations that participated in Exercise Northstar V, a large-scale emergency preparedness exercise.

=== Circle Line ===
An extension of the Circle Line (CCL) to this station was first announced in April 2007. Contract 901 for the construction and completion of Marina Bay CCL station was awarded to Hock Lian Seng Infrastructure Pte. Ltd. for S$348.4 million (US$246.24 million) in February 2008. The scope also included addition and alteration works to the existing NSL station, road diversions of the East Coast Parkway and Marina Street and the demolition of a vehicular underpass. Construction of the station started in February 2008 and was completed on schedule by January 2012.

During the construction, Exit A of the station had to be relocated for construction works for the Circle Line station. As announced on 28 November 2011, the station opened on 14 January 2012 as part of the two-station, 2.4-kilometre (1.5-mile) extension from Promenade, with an opening ceremony the day before.

On 17 January 2013, transport minister Lui Tuck Yew announced that the CCL would be extended from Marina Bay station to HarbourFront station as part of CCL Stage 6. Contract 886 for the construction of cut-and-cover tunnels at Marina Bay Area between the Prince Edward and Marina Bay stations was awarded to Koh Brothers Building & Civil Engineering Contractor (Pte.) Ltd. at S$255.4 million (US$184.9 million) in September 2017. Construction began in 2017, and was expected to be completed by 2025. However, with the COVID-19 pandemic in Singapore, the completion date was pushed to 2026.

Platforms of the station

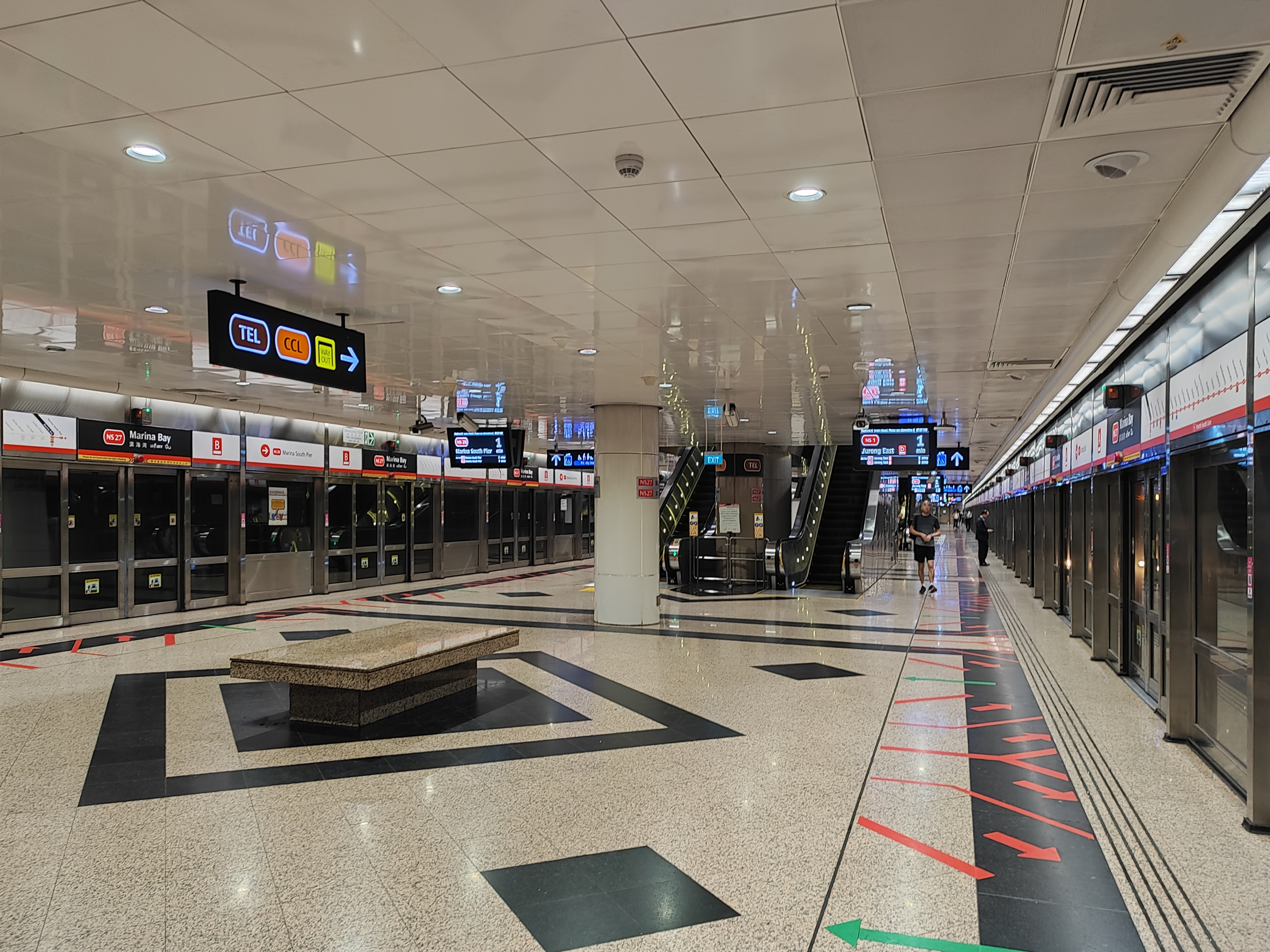
NSL Platforms A and B

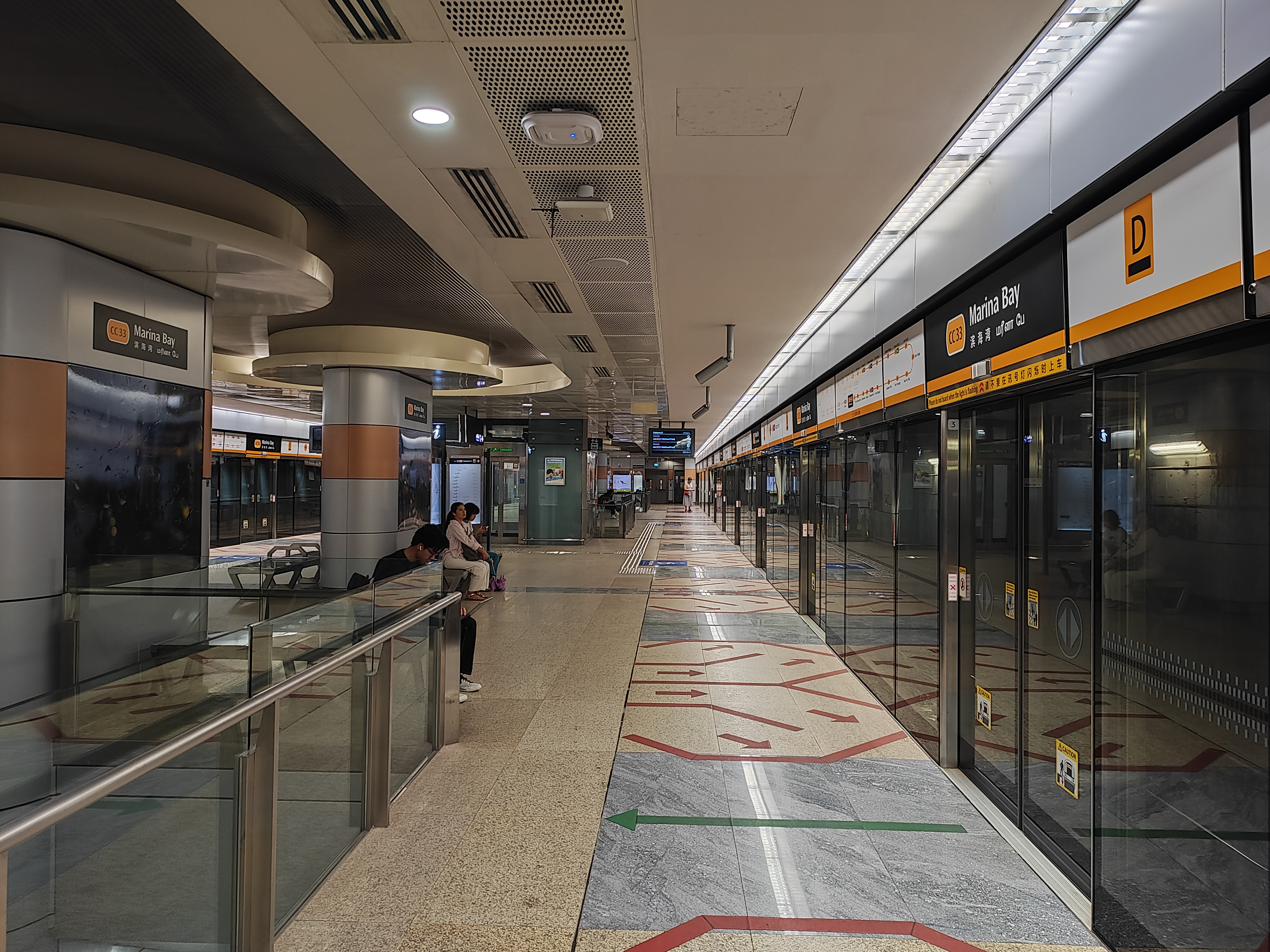
CCL Platforms C and D

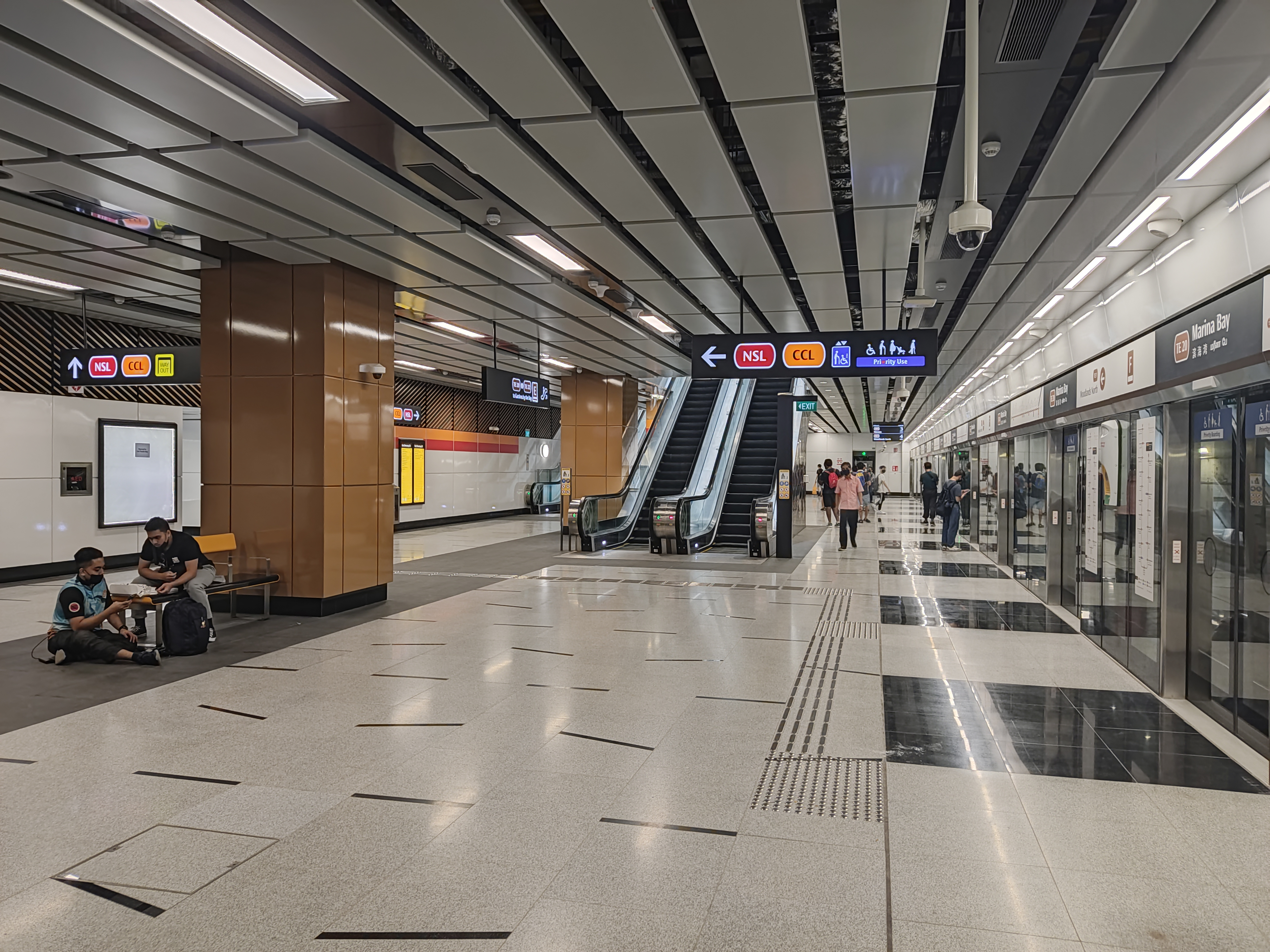
TEL Platform F

=== Thomson–East Coast Line ===
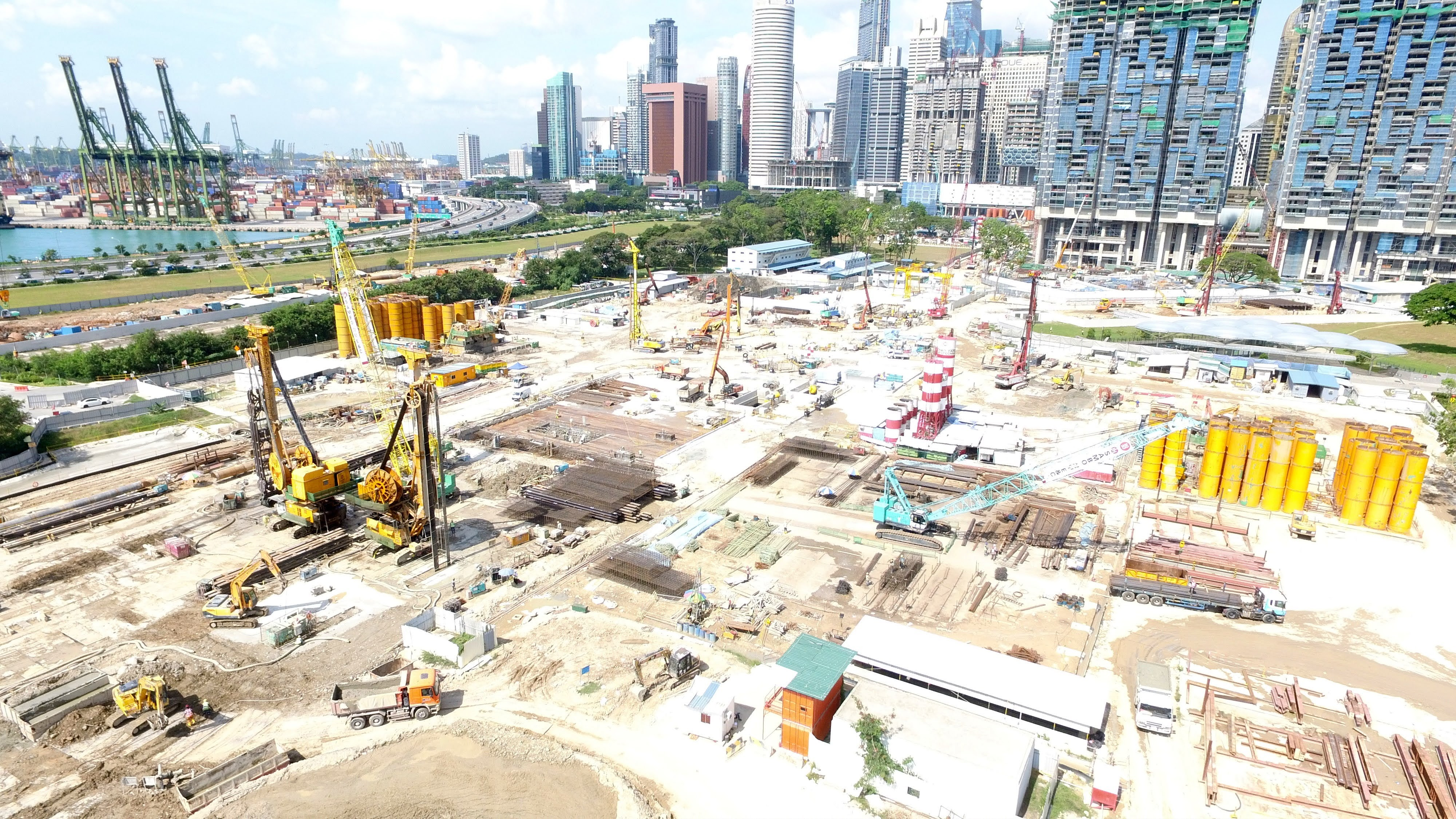
Construction site of the TEL station in January 2016

On 29 August 2012, it was announced that Marina Bay station would interchange with the 22-station Thomson Line (TSL). Contract T226 for the design and construction of Marina Bay TSL Station and associated tunnels was awarded to Taisei Corporation for S$425 million (US$335.4 million) in February 2014. Construction started in 2014, with an expected completion date in 2021.

On 15 August 2014, the Land Transport Authority (LTA) announced that TSL would merge with the Eastern Region Line to form the Thomson–East Coast Line (TEL). Marina Bay station was constructed as part of Phase 3, consisting of 13 stations between the Mount Pleasant and Gardens by the Bay stations. Ground freezing was applied for the first time in Singapore rail construction when building the TEL stacked tunnels and platforms, where it crosses underneath the existing NSL and CCL tunnels. This was due to the layers of weak and strong old alluvium, which do not allow effective ground treatment of the soil. The construction of tunnels also involved close monitoring of the existing train tunnels, especially as the piles supporting the NSL tunnels had to be cut off for the underground walkways and mined train tunnels.

With restrictions imposed on construction due to the COVID-19 pandemic, the TEL3 completion date was pushed back a year to 2022. On 9 March 2022, Transport Minister S. Iswaran announced in Parliament that TEL 3 would open in the second half of that year. As confirmed during a visit by Iswaran at the Outram Park and Maxwell stations on 7 October 2022, the TEL station began operations on 13 November 2022.

== Details ==
=== Location ===
Marina Bay station is located near the eponymous Marina Bay underneath the junction of Bayfront Avenue and Park Street. The station serves various developments, including Asia Square Towers 1 & 2, Marina One Residences, Marina Bay Financial Centre, Singapore Conference Hall and V on Shenton, as well as cultural landmarks such as Red Dot Museum, Shenton House and Singapore Chinese Cultural Centre. The station is also within walking distance of Downtown station on the Downtown Line.

=== Services ===
Marina Bay station is an interchange station on the NSL, CCL and TEL. Its official station codes are NS27/CC33/TE20. When it opened, it had the station code of M1 before being changed to the current alphanumeric style in August 2001 as a part of a system-wide campaign to cater to the expanding MRT System. The CCL station code was renumbered from CE2 to CC33 with the opening of Circle Line Stage 6 in July 2026.

On the NSL, the station is located between Raffles Place and Marina South Pier stations. The NSL platform is open from 5:37 am and close at 12:15 am. On the CCL, the station is between Prince Edward Road and Bayfront stations. The CCL platform is open from 5:49 am and close at 12:15 am. The station was the terminus of the CCL extension. During off-peak periods, shuttle services from Marina Bay terminated at Stadium station via Promenade. On the TEL, the station is between Shenton Way and Gardens by the Bay stations, with headways of 3 to 6 minutes. The TEL platform is open from 5:45 am and close at 12:40 am.

=== Design ===
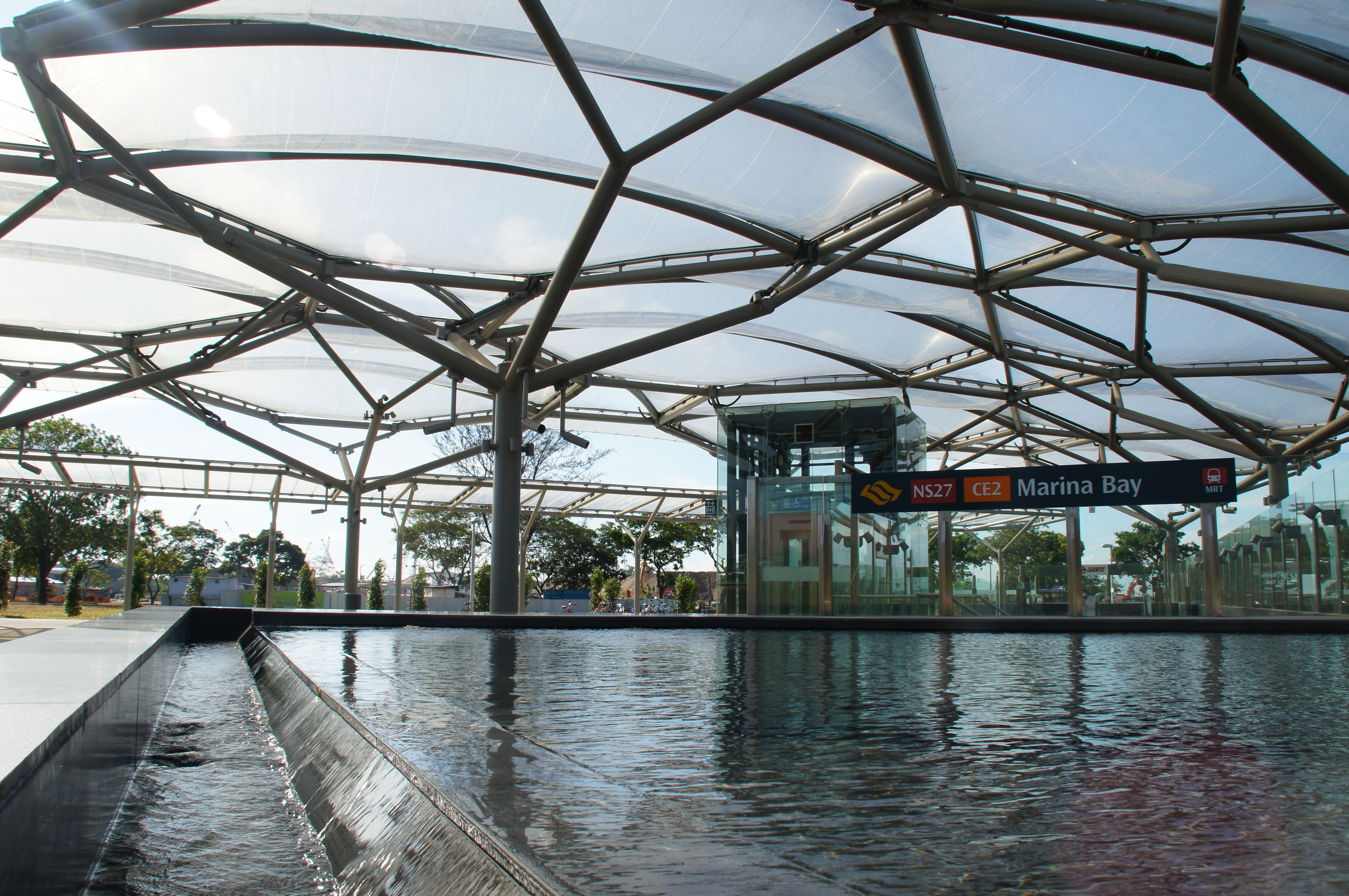
The reflective pool at the station entrance

Marina Bay station on the NSL was among the first nine underground MRT stations designated as a Civil Defence shelter. As such, the station is structurally reinforced against bomb attacks with layers of earth-backed, air-backed and airtight walls and slabs. Like many stations on the initial MRT network, Marina Bay NSL station has an island platform. The TEL station has a stacked platform layout. The lower platform is built at a depth of 40 metres (130 ft).

Aedas and Quarry Bay designed the CCL station around the concepts of visibility, integration and efficiency. Consequently, the station's entrances are integrated with the park around it. A closed maintenance facility near the station was converted to an underground pedestrian network connecting Exit 5 to the rest of the station, as well as future developments around the station. The facility was used for Downtown Line operations. The tracks leading to the defunct facility were removed in June 2021.

The translucent entrance canopy and the large CCL entrance are intended to maximise the amount of natural light entering the station. Only the lift, escalators, the lightweight ETFE canopy and the reflective pool are visible from street level; this reduces the station's aesthetic impact on the park's landscape while giving passengers a full view of the park from the station entrance. The reflective pool was also intended to provide a smooth transition between the exits and the park.

The station's design was shortlisted for the Small Project Award at the World Architecture Festival in 2012. The station received numerous other awards, such as the Land Transport Excellence Awards 2012 (as the Best Design Rail / Road Infrastructure – Project Partner), the 2013 UIPT Asia-Pacific Grow with Public Transport Award and an honourable mention for the Singapore Institute of Architects Architectural Design Awards 2012.

The station is wheelchair-accessible. A tactile system, consisting of tiles with rounded or elongated raised studs, guides visually impaired commuters through the station, with dedicated tactile routes connecting the station entrances to the platforms. Wider fare gates allow wheelchair users to access the station more easily. The TEL station also has green building features including inbuilt solar panels to minimise energy consumption.

== Artworks ==
=== August 9 babies ===
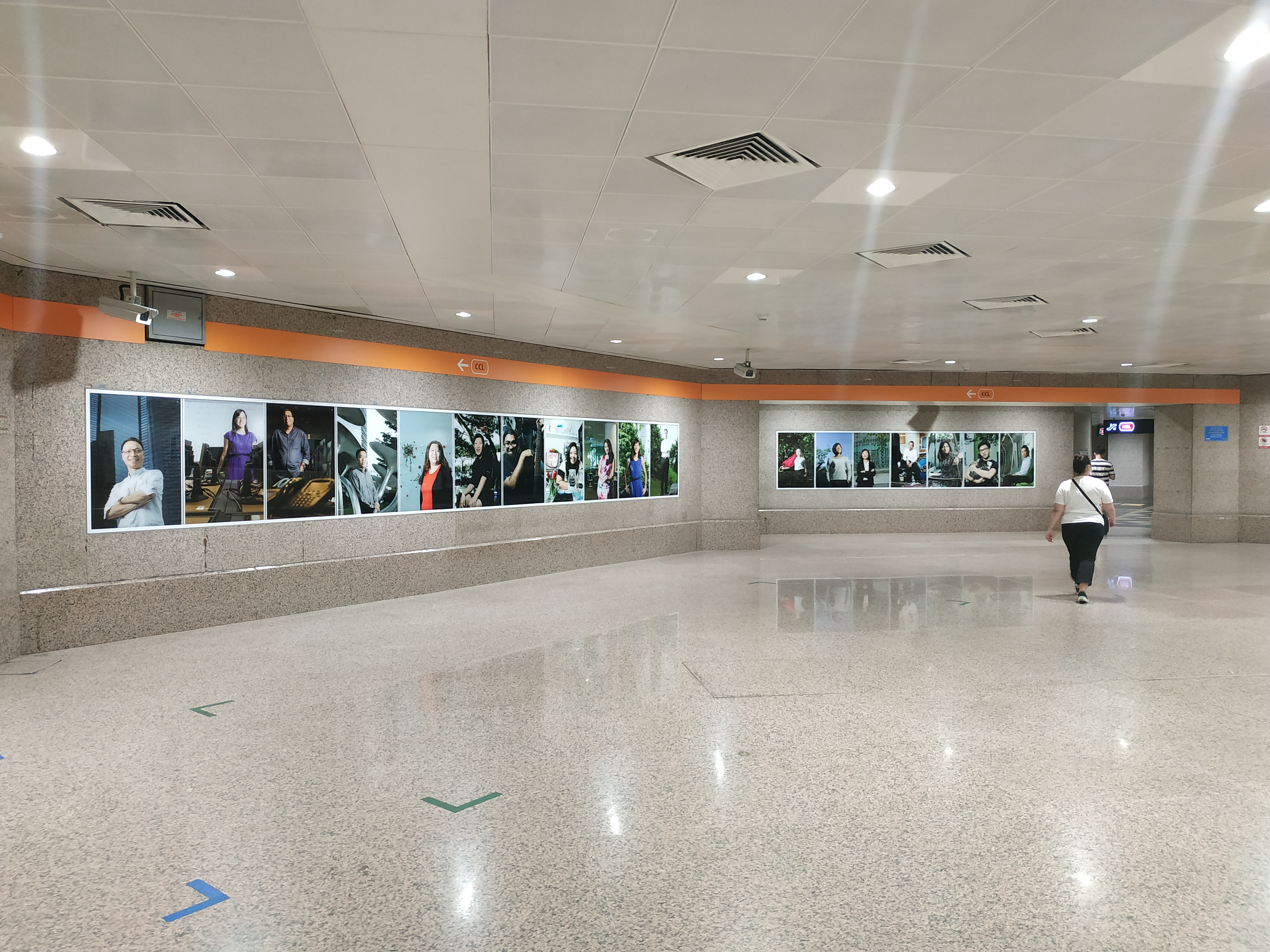
The gallery of 50 photographs at the NSL concourse

August 9 babies, a gallery of 50 photographs by Tay Kay Chin, was commissioned in advance of the 50th National Day, the anniversary of Singapore's founding. The work was initially created as a tribute to Singapore's 40th anniversary with only 40 photographs, as an answer to Tay's personal question of what it means to be a Singaporean. The 40 photographs were of Singaporeans born on National Day, and Tay wondered if people born on that day have a stronger sense of patriotism.

With this background, the LTA approached him to update the collection of photographs for the country's 50th National Day. Tay revisited some of the people he had photographed; he said the most rewarding part was how much they had changed since, especially regarding their aspirations and challenges in living in Singapore. The work took inspiration from Brian Lanker's I Dream a World and Ron Kovic's Born on the Fourth of July, both a compilation of portraits. The subjects of the expanded project were chosen based on their gender, ethnicity and occupation, representing Singapore's diverse demographics.

=== Flowers in Blossom II ===
The sculpture Flowers in Blossom, by Tay Chee Toh, was originally hung underneath the dome of Orchard station. Described as a "colourful twirl" of metal and plastic shapes, the sculpture was disassembled after the ION Orchard shopping mall was constructed over Orchard station. The recreated version, known as Flowers in Blossom II, is larger than the original version and was intended as a homage to the public artwork project predating the Art-in-Transit programme.

=== Train Rides on Rainy Days ===
Train Rides on Rainy Days by Nah Yong En is a series of fourteen raindrop pictures displayed at the CCL platform. One side is themed to greenery, while the other reflects 'blue evenings', contrasting with the orange pillars of the station. The raindrops in each picture produce inverted images of the area depicted. Intended to bring "a refreshing element of nature" into the underground station, the work represents scenes seen by commuters as they gaze out of the window from a train whenever it rains.

Nah had originally used the photographs as guides for his own paintings displayed at his graduation ceremony. The LTA architect Andrew Mead then recommended to the Art Review Panel that the station use Nah's set of photos. According to Nah, the work came from his fascination with looking out of the trains' windows, which he said not many commuters do. The photographs for this project were reshot in higher quality using a new camera that could capture the raindrop up close, allowing it to look sharp against the blurred background. Nah's main issue was taking the pictures under the right lighting conditions. The buildings would appear dark under rainy clouds if his camera was exposed to the sky, but the sky would appear washed out if the buildings were shot under better lighting conditions. To obtain the appropriate balance of light, Nah took his images during the short period after rain stopped falling.

These photographs were taken along the North–South and East–West lines. Initially, Nah's two paintings at the graduation ceremony were to be displayed with his raindrop images. However, the Art Review Panel felt the paintings did not complement the photographs well, so they were replaced by two additional images.

=== Walking into The Interstitial ===
Walking into The Interstitial by Tang Ling Nah is a collection of charcoal drawings scanned and printed on vitreous enamel panels. The drawings depict various urban transitional spaces, including alleys, corridors and void decks. They were merged to form surrealistic murals with the trompe l'oeil effect, giving the impression of a larger space. These scenes were derived from Shenton Way, Cecil Street and Raffles Place, thus connecting the old financial district of Shenton Way with the new financial district of Marina Bay.
