= Shenton Way MRT station =

Mass Rapid Transit station in Singapore

Shenton Way TE19 珊顿道 ஷென்ட்டன் வே
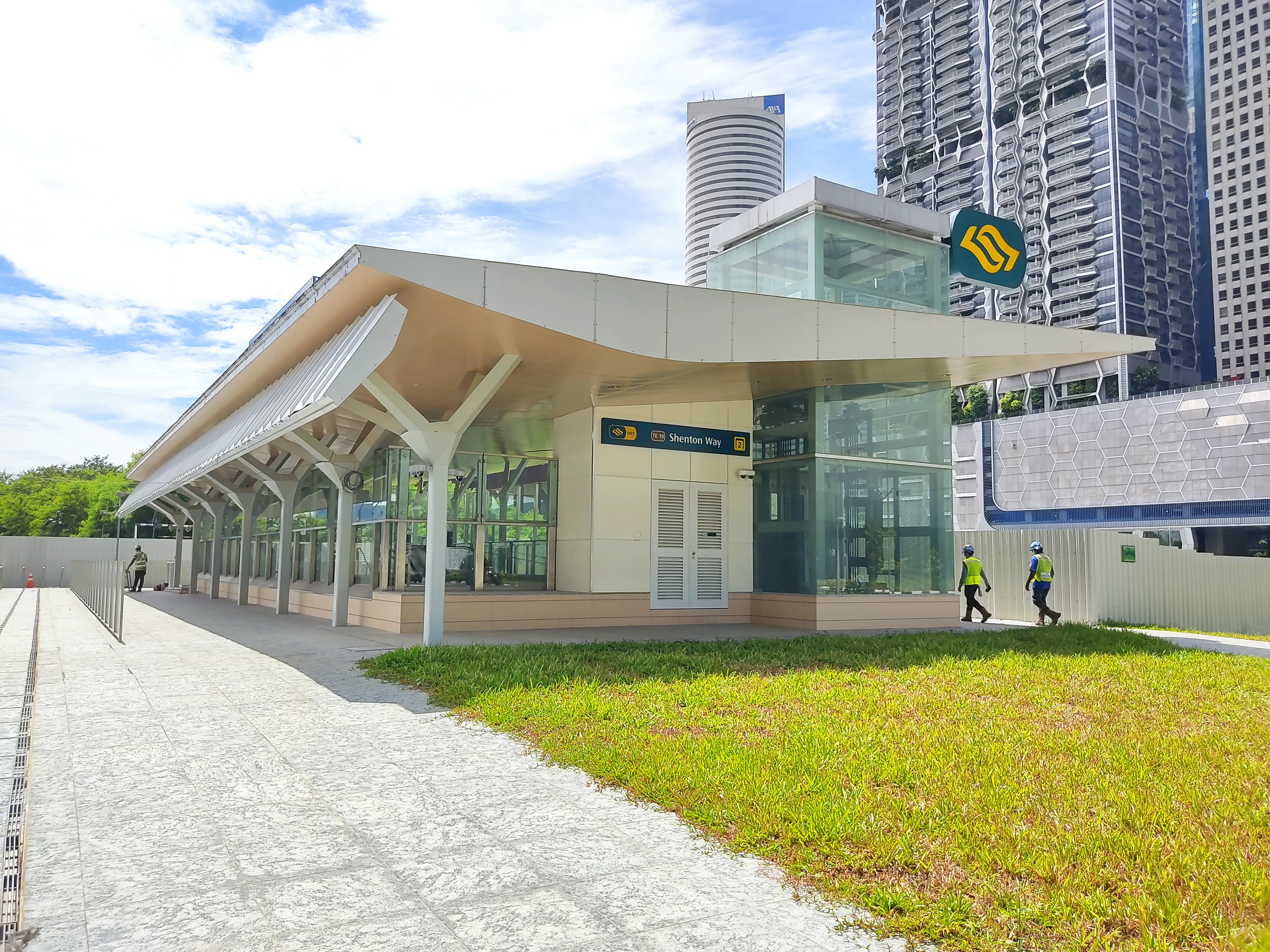
- Exit 2 of the station

General information
- Location: 2 Park Street, Singapore 018928
- Coordinates: 01°16′39″N 103°51′03″E
- System: Mass Rapid Transit (MRT) station
- Owner: Land Transport Authority
- Operator: SMRT Trains
- Line: Thomson–East Coast Line
- Platforms: 2 (2 stacked platforms)
- Tracks: 2
- Connections: Bus, Taxi

Construction
- Structure type: Underground
- Depth: 38 metres (125 ft)
- Platform levels: 2
- Accessible: Yes

Other information
- Station code: SHW

History
- Opened: 13 November 2022; 3 years ago
- Former names: Shenton, McCallum Street

Passengers
- June 2024: 7,311 per day

Services
Preceding station	Mass Rapid Transit	Following station
Maxwell towards Woodlands North	Thomson–East Coast Line	Marina Bay towards Bayshore
Track layout
Location
- Location within Singapore Rail central area

Shenton Way MRT station is an underground Mass Rapid Transit (MRT) station on the Thomson–East Coast Line (TEL). Situated in Downtown Core, Singapore, the station is near Shenton Way and commercial developments such as Asia Square and Marina One.

First announced in August 2012 as part of the Thomson Line (TSL), Shenton Way station was constructed as part of TEL Phase 3 (TEL 3) with the merger of the TSL and the Eastern Region Line. The station opened on 13 November 2022. Shenton Way station features the artworks Stride Alongside the Bo-men by Daisy Boman and Everyday Singapore by Quek Kiat Sing.

== History ==
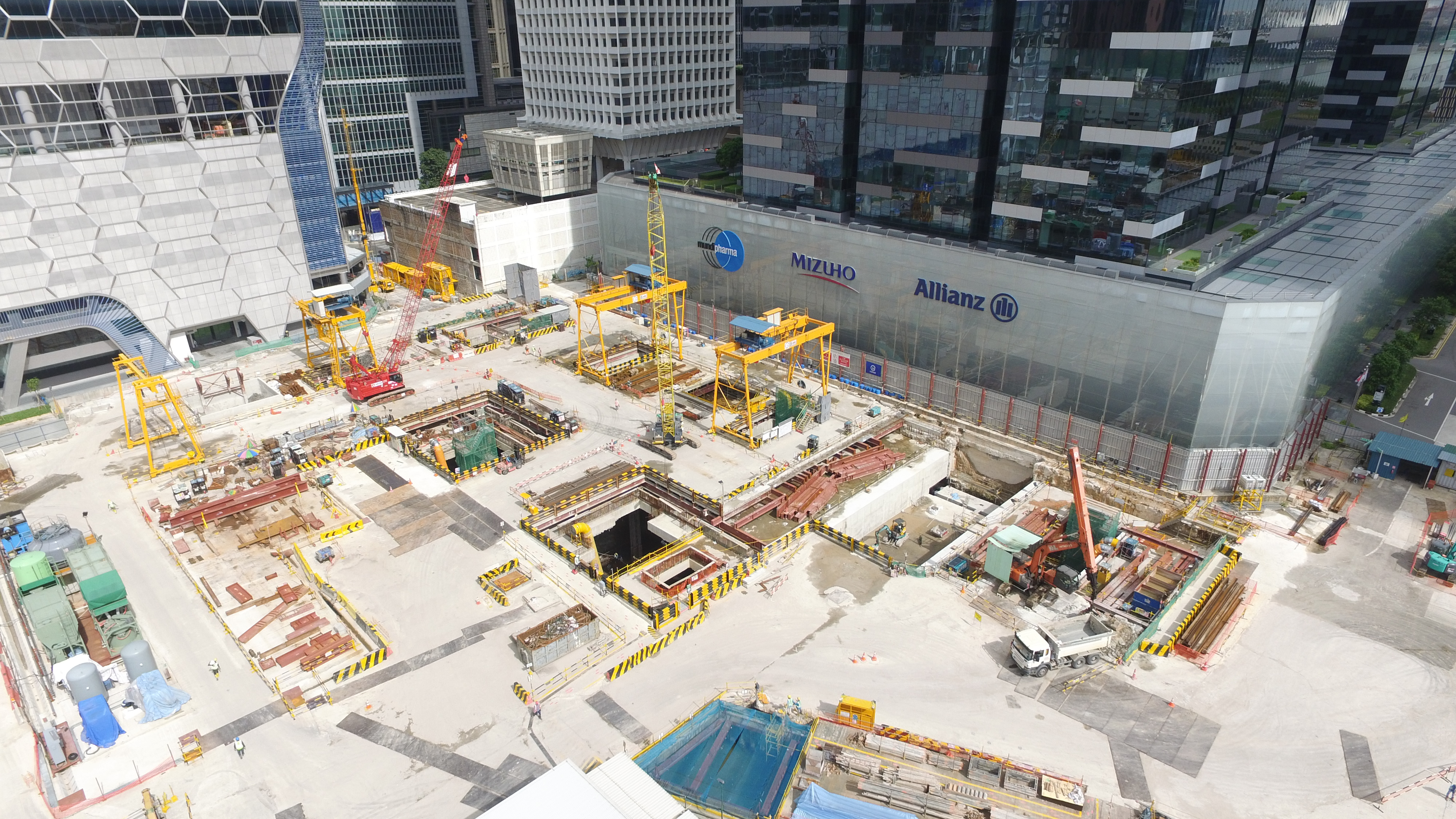
Construction works as of December 2016

Shenton Way station was first announced on 29 August 2012 as part of the Thomson Line (TSL). Contract T225 for the design and construction of this station and associated tunnels was awarded to Shanghai Tunnel Engineering Co. Ltd at S$368 million (US$274.6 million) in May 2014. Construction started in 2014, with an expected completion date of 2021.

On 15 August 2014, the Land Transport Authority (LTA) further announced that the TSL would merge with the Eastern Region Line to form the Thomson–East Coast Line (TEL). Shenton Way station, part of the proposed line, would be constructed as part of TEL Phase 3 (TEL 3), consisting of 13 stations between Mount Pleasant and Gardens by the Bay. The station was constructed close to various developments, such as Asia Square Tower 2. Sensors were installed on tractors warning workers of their proximity to the facade of Asia Square Tower 2. A canal above the station had to be rerouted to a temporary canal with a reinforced concrete base.

With restrictions imposed on construction due to the COVID-19 pandemic, the TEL3 completion date was pushed by a year to 2022. On 9 March 2022, Transport Minister S. Iswaran announced in Parliament that TEL 3 would open in the second half of that year. As confirmed during a visit by Iswaran at the Outram Park and Maxwell stations on 7 October 2022, it began operations on 13 November.

In May 2025, The Straits Times reported uneven ground at the station entrances. The LTA said it had known about the issue since late 2024 and was working with the Building and Construction Authority (BCA) on a long-term solution, which included engineering studies and ground investigations. The BCA said the uneven ground was probably caused by natural ground settlement. Nevertheless, since the entrances are on deep foundations, the BCA had not identified immediate or structural safety risks.

== Details ==
Platforms of the station

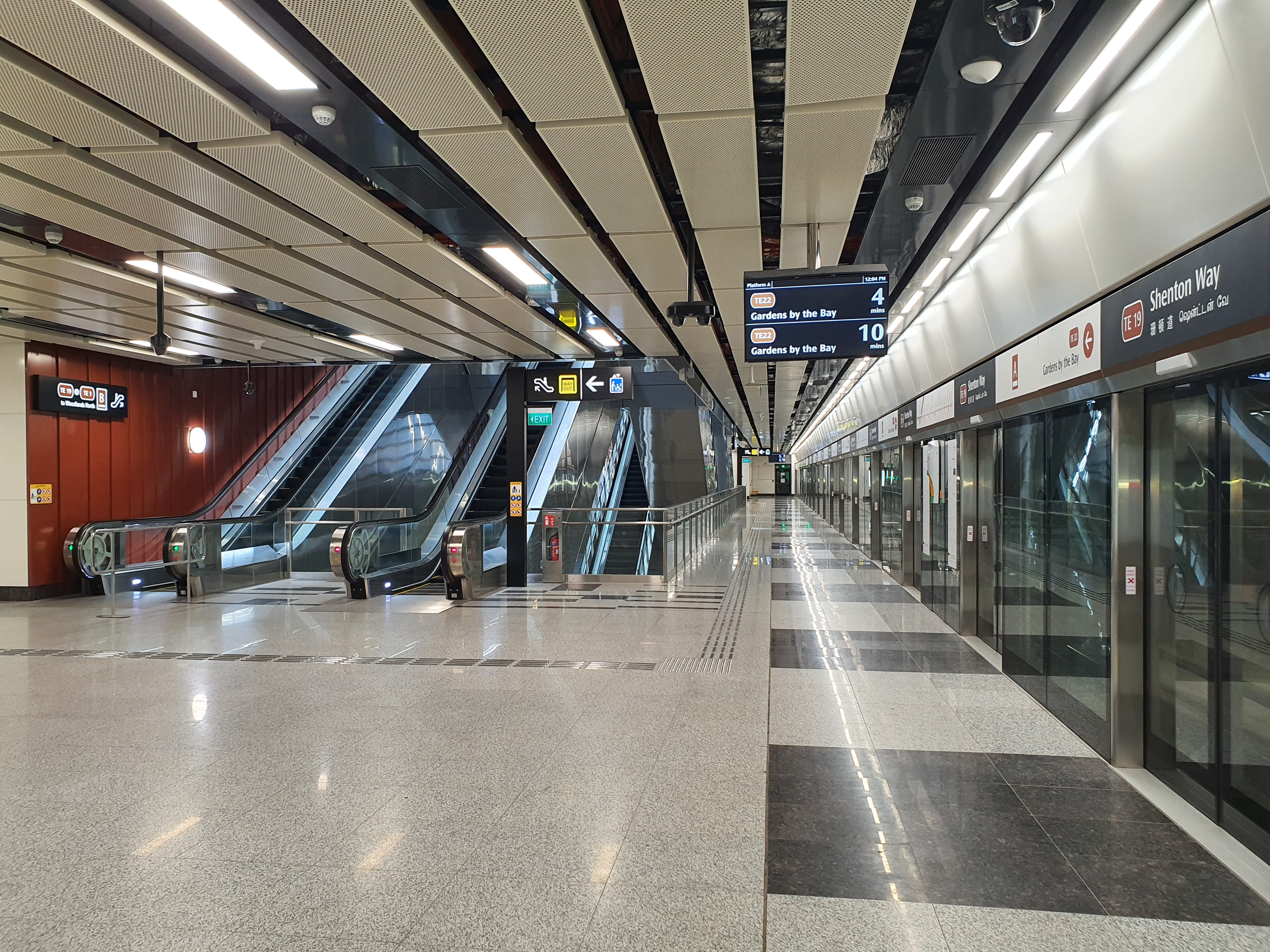
Platform A

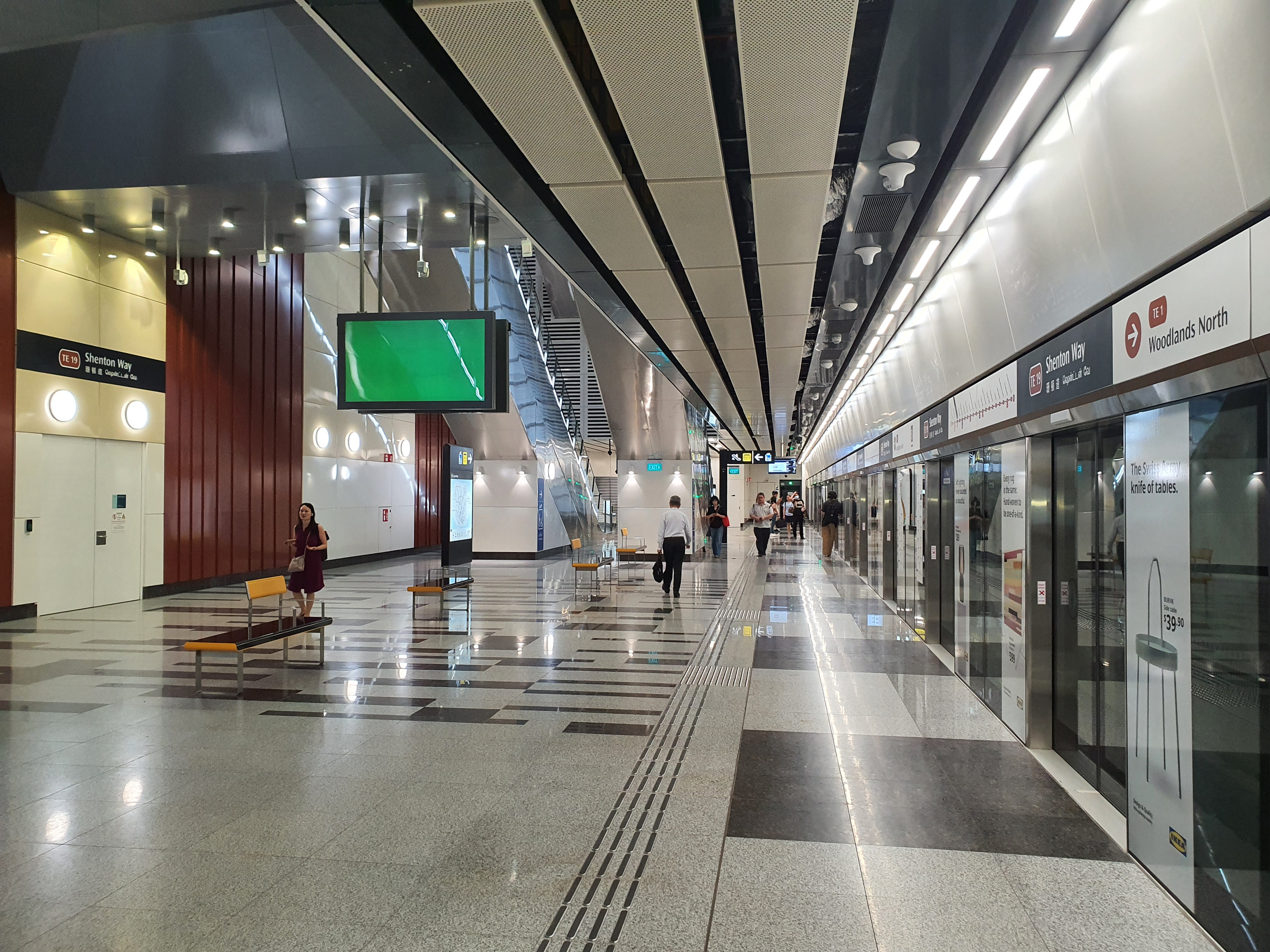
Platform B

Shenton Way station is on the TEL and is between the Maxwell and Marina Bay stations. The official station code is TE19. Being part of the TEL, the station is operated by SMRT Trains. Train frequencies on the TEL range from 3 to 6 minutes.

The station is located along Park Street near the eponymous Shenton Way. Surrounding commercial developments include Asia Square, Marina One, One Raffles Quay, V on Shenton and OUE Downtown. The station is also close to the Singapore Conference Hall. Shenton Way station is also within walking distance to Downtown station on the Downtown Line and Tanjong Pagar station on the East–West Line. The station has a stacked platform layout with a depth of 38 metres (125 ft).

Stride Alongside the Bo-men is a set of three white sculptures by Daisy Boman. Donated by PSA International under the Gift of Art programme, the artwork represents people commuting into the Central Business District. An Art-in-Transit artwork Everyday Singapore 每日所见 by Quek Kiat Sing depicts everyday scenes of people alongside images of an old series of Singaporean banknotes. These scenes include the lunch crowd at Lau Pa Sat, people queuing up at the ATM, bird-watching, and chasing after an old banknote. Alluding to how art imitates life, the artwork is intended to be a reflection of ourselves.
