= Downtown MRT station =

Mass Rapid Transit station in Singapore

Downtown DT17 市中心 டௌன்டவுன்
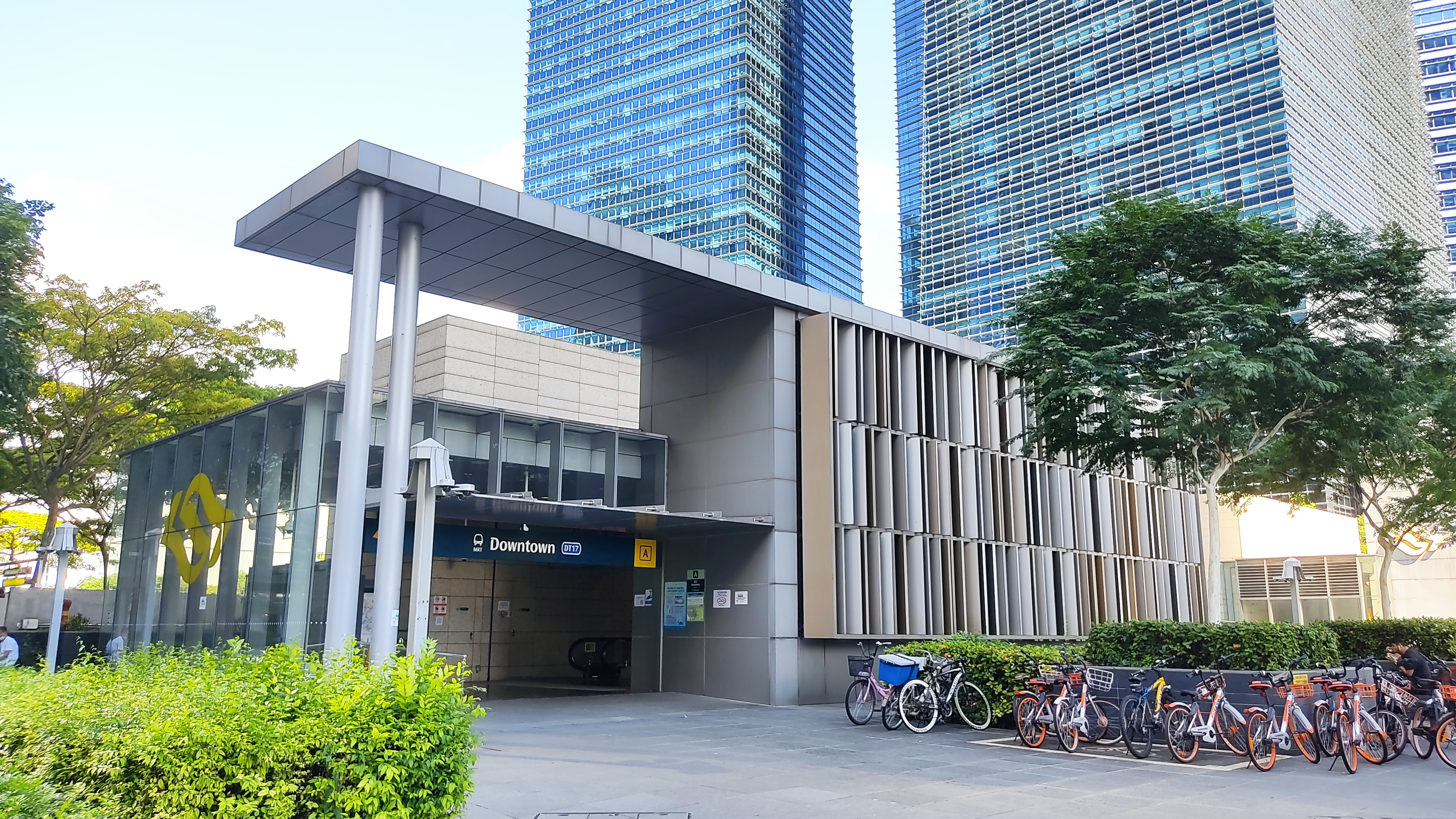
- Exit A of the station

General information
- Location: 15 Central Boulevard, Singapore 018969
- Coordinates: 01°16′46″N 103°51′11″E
- System: Mass Rapid Transit (MRT) station
- Owner: Land Transport Authority
- Operator: SBS Transit
- Line: Downtown Line
- Platforms: 2 (2 side platforms)
- Tracks: 2
- Connections: NS26 EW14 Raffles Place; TE19 Shenton Way; Bus, Taxi

Construction
- Structure type: Underground
- Platform levels: 1
- Parking: Yes
- Cycle facilities: Yes
- Accessible: Yes

Other information
- Station code: DTN

History
- Opened: 22 December 2013; 12 years ago
- Former names: Landmark

Passengers
- June 2024: 15,851 per day

Services
| Preceding station | Mass Rapid Transit | Following station |
|---|---|---|
| Bayfront towards Bukit Panjang | Downtown Line | Telok Ayer towards Expo |
Track layout
Location
- Location within Singapore Rail central area

Downtown MRT station is an underground Mass Rapid Transit (MRT) station on the Downtown Line (DTL). Located in Downtown Core, Singapore, underneath Central Boulevard, the station serves various commercial developments including the Marina Bay Financial Centre, Asia Square and SGX Centre. The station is operated by SBS Transit.

First announced as Landmark MRT station in 2005 as part of the Circle Line's Downtown extension, the station was constructed as part of DTL Stage 1. The station opened in 2013. Downtown station features an Art-in-Transit artwork Leaves by Jason Lim.

== History ==
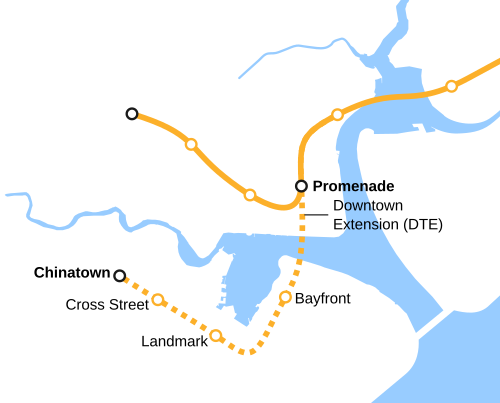
The original Downtown Extension (DTE) from Promenade to Chinatown

The station was first announced as Landmark station when the Land Transport Authority (LTA) unveiled the 3.4-kilometre (2.1-mile) Downtown extension (DTE) on 14 June 2005. The DTE was initially planned to be a branch of the Circle line, extending from Milennia (now Promenade) station to Chinatown station. In 2007, the DTE was revised, becoming Stage 1 of the 40-kilometre (25-mile) Downtown line (DTL). Through a public poll, the station was renamed to Downtown in June 2009.

Contract C907 for the construction of the station was awarded to Taisei Corporation for S$230 million (US$152.6 million) in December 2007. The contract also included the construction of Central Boulevard above the station. The station held an open house on 7 December 2013. Prime Minister Lee Hsien Loong held an official inauguration at this station on 21 December; the station commenced operations the following day along with the DTL Stage 1 stations.

== Station details ==
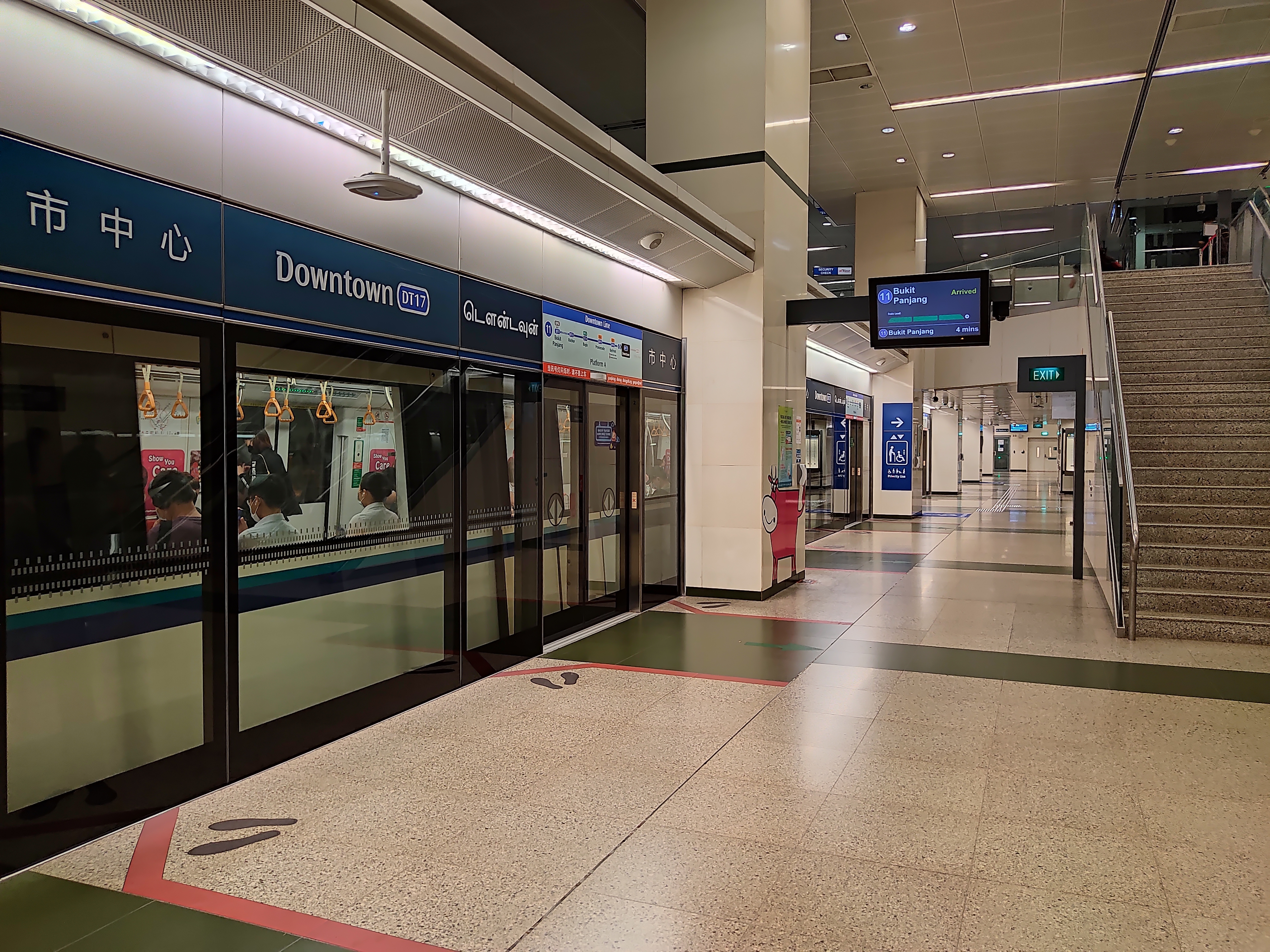
Platform A of the station

Downtown station serves the DTL and is situated between the Bayfront and Telok Ayer stations. The official station code is DT17. Downtown station is within walking distance of the Raffles Place and Marina Bay stations on the North South Line, and Shenton Way station on the Thomson–East Coast Line. The station is operated by SBS Transit as part of the DTL. The station has a side platform configuration with four underground levels.

Downtown station is underneath Central Boulevard between the junctions of Straits View and Marina View, and serves the Marina Bay Financial Centre. The station's six entrances connect to surrounding developments and landmarks including Asia Square, Hong Leong Building, Marina Bay Suites, One Raffles Quay, OUE Downtown and SGX Centre. The station has provisions to link with future developments.

=== Artwork ===
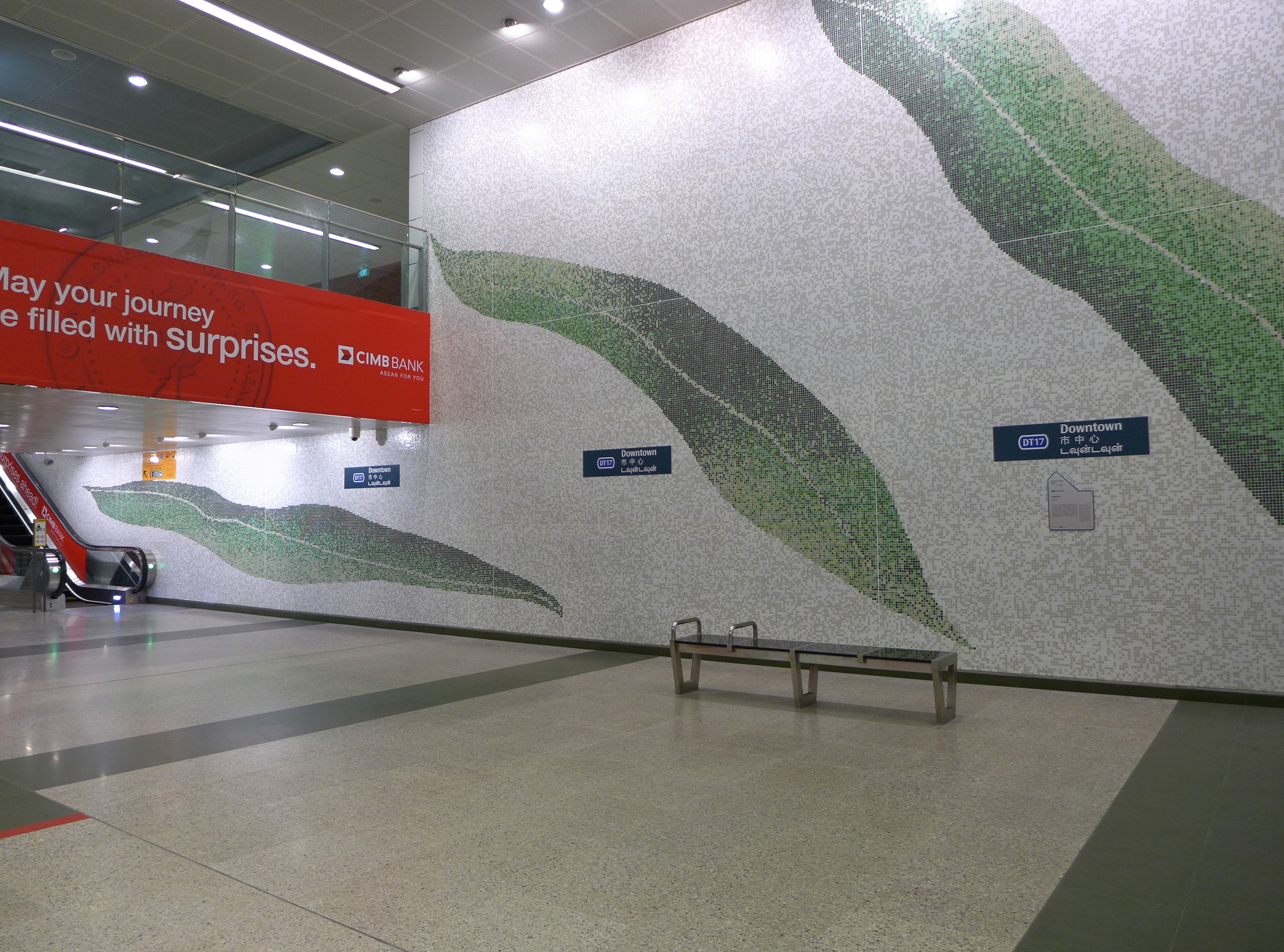
Station artwork

Leaves by Jason Lim is a mosaic of six leaves displayed at this station as part of the Art-in-Transit programme, a public art showcase which integrates artworks into the MRT network. While the leaves on a macroscopic level guide commuters to the platforms, the close-up view shows a series of plant cells reflecting how local businesses are connected. The work was inspired by the structure of bamboo leaves; bamboo is significant in Asian economies and cultures, representing integrity and resilience.

Lim initially planned a mural of a single leaf blade across the platform wall, but, due to the platform design, he changed his planned artwork to six blades. He used mosaic tiles for the artwork to create a pixellated effect, allowing commuters to interpret his work in various ways. The work was first created on sheets of A3 graph paper, with each square shaded. These drawings were scanned in low resolution and enlarged to further "pixelate" them and create the intended mosaic effect. Rather than mounting Lim's work on cement, the LTA allowed Lim to install mosaic tiles on the entirety of the wall dedicated to the artwork. This allowed his work to be integrated with the station's design. An Italian mosaic tile manufacturer produced the tiles.
