= Maxwell Food Centre =

Hawker centre in Tanjong Pagar, Singapore

- 麦士威熟食中心 (Chinese); Pusat Makanan Maxwell (Malay) மேக்ஸ்வெல் உணவு மையம் (Tamil)
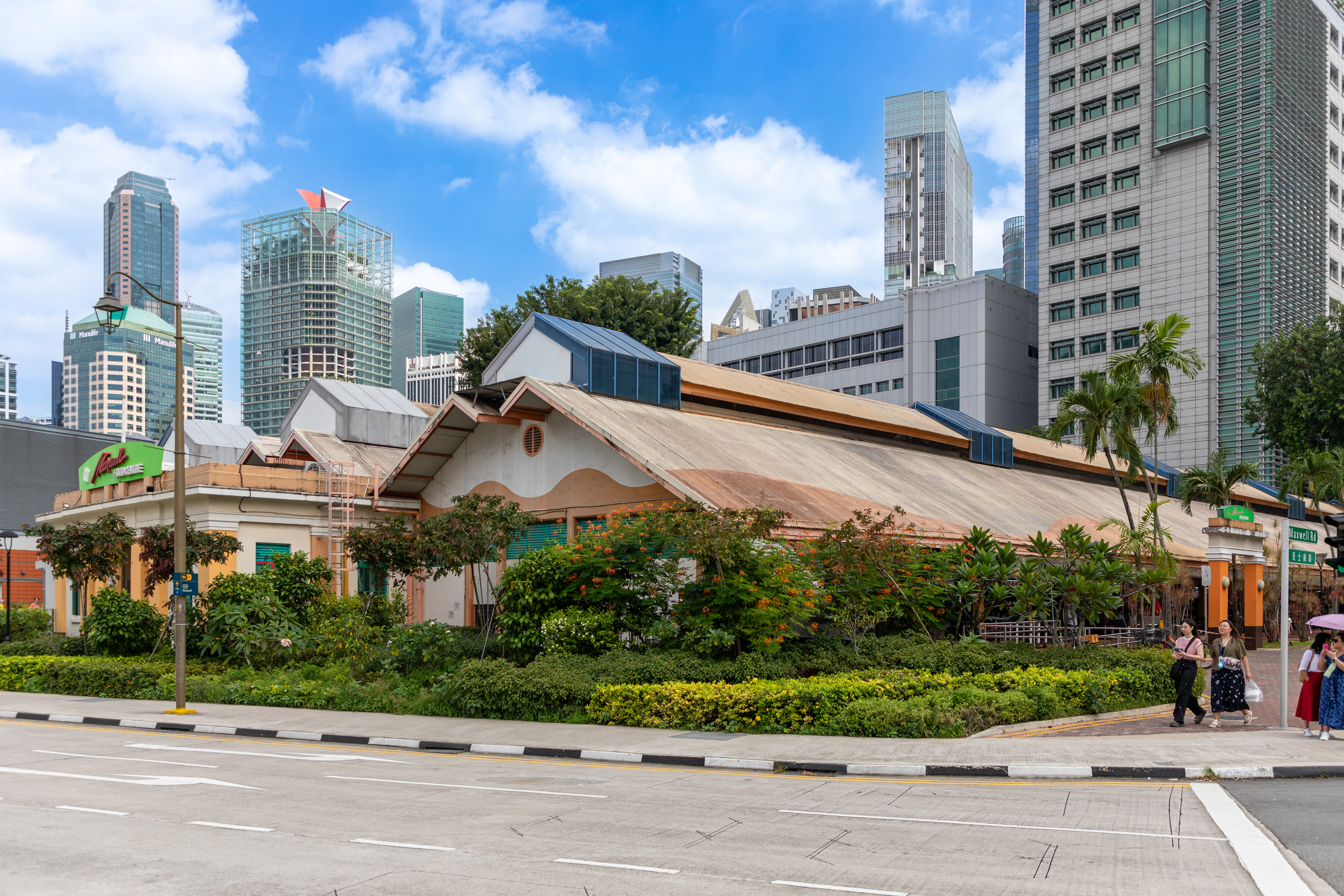
- Maxwell Food Centre as seen from South Bridge Road in 2024
- Interactive map of the Maxwell Food Centre area
- Former names: Maxwell Market (1928–1987); Kim Hua Market (1928–1987); Maxwell Road Food Centre (1987–2000)

General information
- Location: Downtown Core, Singapore, 1 Kadayanallur Street; 069184
- Coordinates: 1°16′49″N 103°50′41″E
- Opened: 17 November 1928; 97 years ago
- Renovated: 15 May 2001; 25 years ago
- Cost: S$115,021
- Renovation cost: S$3.2 million
- Landlord: National Environment Agency

Technical details
- Floor area: 3,365.392 m^{2} (36,224.78 sq ft)

Renovating team
- Architect: ID Architects

Other information
- Number of stores: 103
- Public transit access: TE18 Maxwell; DT18 Telok Ayer; DT19 NE4 Chinatown; EW15 Tanjong Pagar

Maxwell Food Centre is a hawker centre located in Tanjong Pagar, at the junction of Maxwell Road and South Bridge Road. The hawker centre is part of the Downtown Core planning area.

Maxwell is one of the most popular hawker centres in Singapore, featuring 103 hawkers selling a wide variety of local and international cuisines. Popular dishes include ham chim peng, ngo hiang, and herbal broths made from home-brewed recipes.

== History ==
=== Maxwell Market (1928–1987) ===
Built on a Chinese burial ground, construction of the market began in 1927 at an initial cost of S$103,516. In July 1928, a tender notice was published for the construction of stalls within the market. The tender costed an additional S$11,505, bringing the total construction cost to S$115,021.

Opened on 17 November 1928 as Maxwell Market, it received thousands of applications for rental of the stalls within the market. However, as the municipality anticipated that many of the applicants were going to resell their stalls at a higher price to others, each licence allocated was unable to be transferred. The opening of Maxwell also attracted many unlicenced hawkers, causing stallholders to be unable to make any profits. The market was also known as Kim Hua Market.

As such, the total rent collected in 1928 was only S$3,545, and the market remained empty as many stallholders decided to give up their stalls and continue operating in the vicinity, where they did not have to pay rent or be bounded by the market regulations.

To increase tenancy in Maxwell, a by-law banning hawkers in the vicinity was proposed, and stalls were rent-free till the end of 1930 for existing stallholders. On 5 January 1931, the rent-free scheme was further extended till the end of March 1931.

In December 1946, Maxwell Market was the first location chosen by the Singapore Social Welfare Department to house a restaurant aimed at providing cheaper food to families. Named as the Family Restaurant, it prepared 2,000 meals daily at a cost of 8 cents, and the meals consisted carbohydrates such as rice and potatoes, as well as salmon.

In January 1949, the municipality passed a rule for municipal markets to only sell perishable goods, and as such, money changers, provision and bread sellers had to relocate their business elsewhere.

=== Maxwell Food Centre ===
On 16 March 1987, after a five-month renovation, Maxwell Market reopened as Maxwell Road Food Centre. With construction costing about S$74,000, the hawker centre housed 70 hawkers from their former site at China Square. However, individual stalls did not have access to running water, and hawkers had to share a common washing area originally meant for washing raw market produce. As such, dirty dishes and cooking ingredients were put together as these washing points, causing the concrete floor to be always wet and littered with trash and food waste.

On 16 October 1991, the Urban Redevelopment Authority (URA) announced that the hawker centre will be demolished to make way for its S$240 million new headquarters. Two days later, the hawkers were informed that they must move out by 30 November 1992, and most of them feared being split up and relocated across the island. The affected hawkers were given the option of either accepting an ex gratia cash payment of up to S$15,000, or moving to another vacant stall in existing hawker centres. However, on 8 July 1993, URA shelved its plans, and the hawker centre remained at its current location. As such, the Ministry of Environment announced plans to renovate the hawker centre, and it was closed on 1 September 2000.

After a S$3.2 million renovation, Maxwell Road Food Centre reopened as Maxwell Food Centre on 15 May 2001, housing 103 hawkers.

== Present day ==
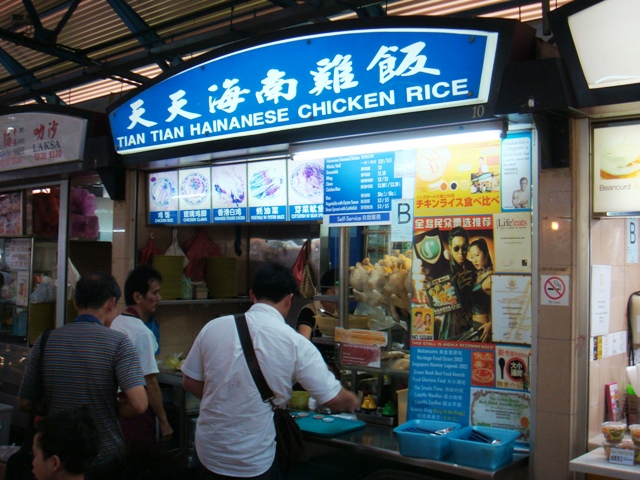
Tian Tian Hainanese Chicken Rice in 2008

Maxwell is one of the most popular hawker centres, and the most featured hawker centre on Instagram, with more than 13,200 posts. In 2016, Tian Tian Hainanese Chicken Rice, a Hainanese chicken rice stall ran by husband and wife Mr and Mrs Loy Chee San, was the first stall in the hawker centre to be awarded a Bib Gourmand.

Celebrities, like singer Dua Lipa, Lady Gaga and actress Drew Barrymore, and foreign dignitaries, such as Vietnam Minister of Foreign Affairs Bùi Thanh Sơn and New Zealand Prime Minister Christopher Luxon, have also dined at the hawker centre.

== See also ==
- Hawker centre
- Singaporean cuisine
