= Maxwell MRT station =

Mass Rapid Transit station in Singapore

Maxwell TE18 麦士威 மெச்ஸ்வெல்
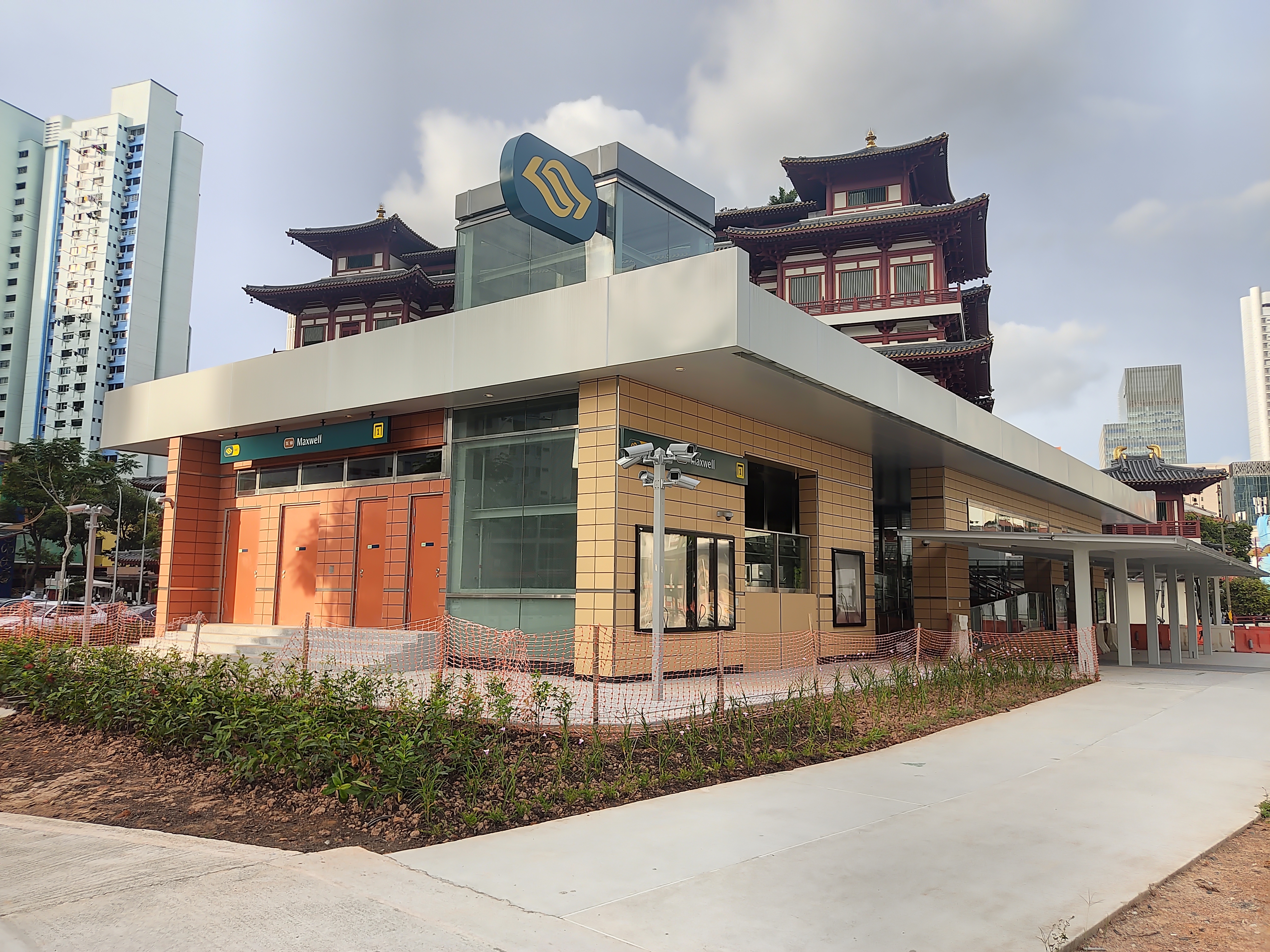
- Exit 1 of the station with the Buddha Tooth Relic Temple in the background.

General information
- Location: 321 South Bridge Road, Singapore 058841
- Coordinates: 01°16′49″N 103°50′38″E
- System: Mass Rapid Transit (MRT) station
- Owner: Land Transport Authority
- Operator: SMRT Trains
- Line: Thomson–East Coast Line
- Platforms: 2 (2 stacked platforms)
- Tracks: 2
- Connections: EW15 Tanjong Pagar; NE4 DT19 Chinatown; DT18 Telok Ayer; Bus, Taxi

Construction
- Structure type: Underground
- Depth: 31 metres (102 ft)
- Platform levels: 2
- Accessible: Yes

Other information
- Station code: MAX

History
- Opened: 13 November 2022; 3 years ago
- Former names: Neil Road, Ann Siang Hill

Passengers
- June 2024: 8,406 per day

Services
Preceding station	Mass Rapid Transit	Following station
Outram Park towards Woodlands North	Thomson–East Coast Line	Shenton Way towards Bayshore
Track layout
Location
- Location within Singapore Rail central area

Maxwell MRT station is an underground Mass Rapid Transit (MRT) station on the Thomson–East Coast Line (TEL) in Singapore. Situated in the Downtown Core and Outram along Neil Road, the station is near the Buddha Tooth Relic Temple and Museum, Sri Mariamman Temple and the Maxwell Food Centre. The station is operated by SMRT Trains.

First announced in August 2012 as part of the Thomson Line (TSL), the station was constructed as part of TEL Phase 3 (TEL 3) with the merger of the TSL and the Eastern Region Line. The station opened on 13 November 2022. Maxwell station features an Art-in-Transit artwork Old Chinatown In New Maxwell Life by Justin Lee.

== History ==
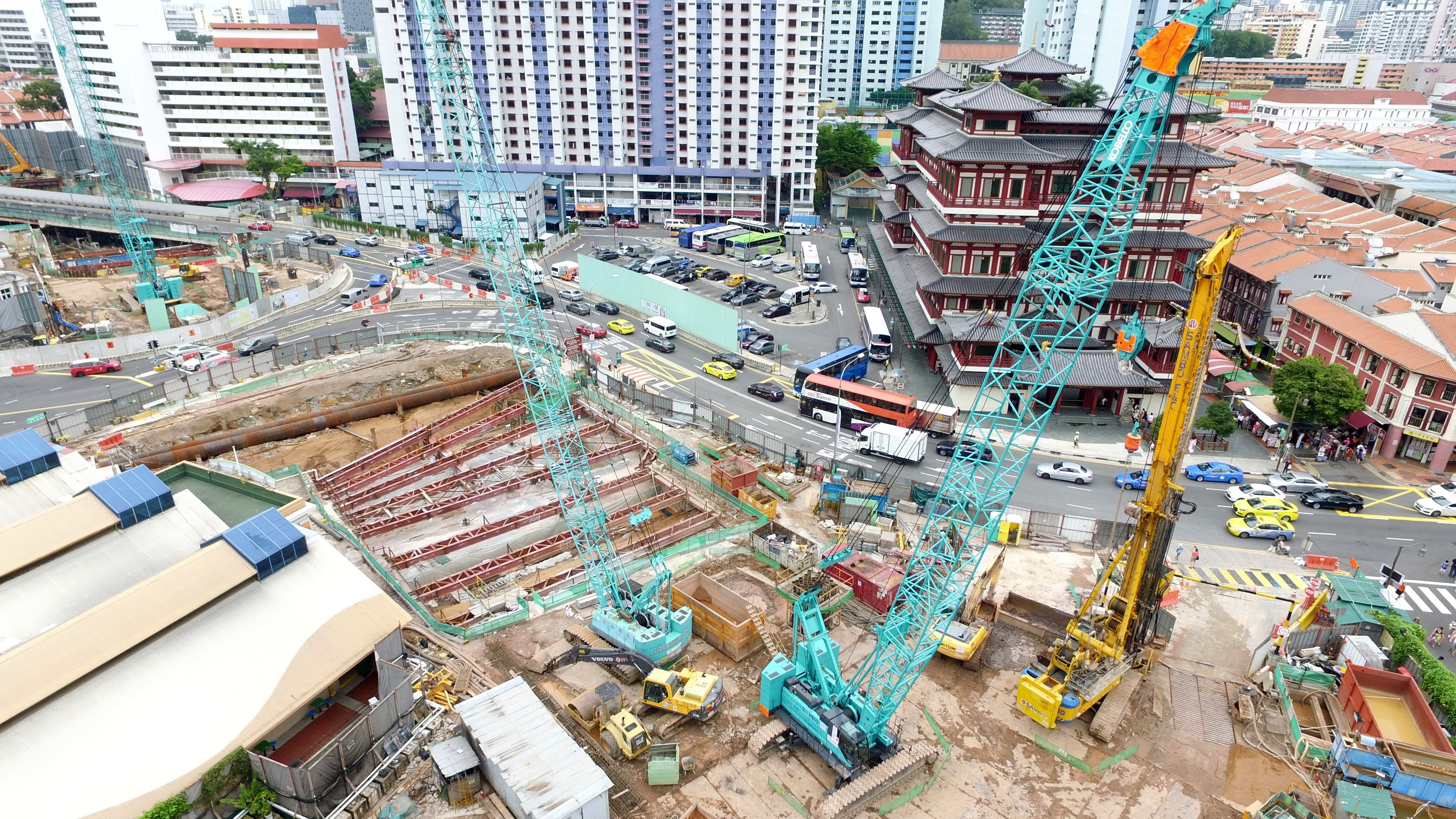
Construction works as of April 2017

The station was first announced on 29 August 2012 as part of the Thomson Line (TSL). Contract T223 for the design and construction of Maxwell Station was awarded to Hock Lian Seng Infrastructure Pte Ltd for S$222 million (US$165.7 million) in April 2014. Construction began in 2014 with an expected completion date of 2021.

On 15 August 2014, the Land Transport Authority (LTA) further announced that the TSL would merge with the Eastern Region Line to form the Thomson–East Coast Line (TEL). Maxwell station, part of the proposed line, would be constructed as part of TEL3, consisting of 13 stations between Mount Pleasant and Gardens by the Bay. With restrictions imposed on construction due to the COVID-19 pandemic, the TEL3 completion date was pushed by a year to 2022. Three COVID-19 confirmed cases were detected at the station construction site on 2 April 2020. A stop work order was issued as a result.

On 9 March 2022, Transport Minister S. Iswaran announced in Parliament that TEL 3 would open in the second half of that year. As confirmed during a visit by Iswaran to this station and Outram Park station on 7 October 2022, the station began operations on 13 November.

== Description ==
Platforms of the station

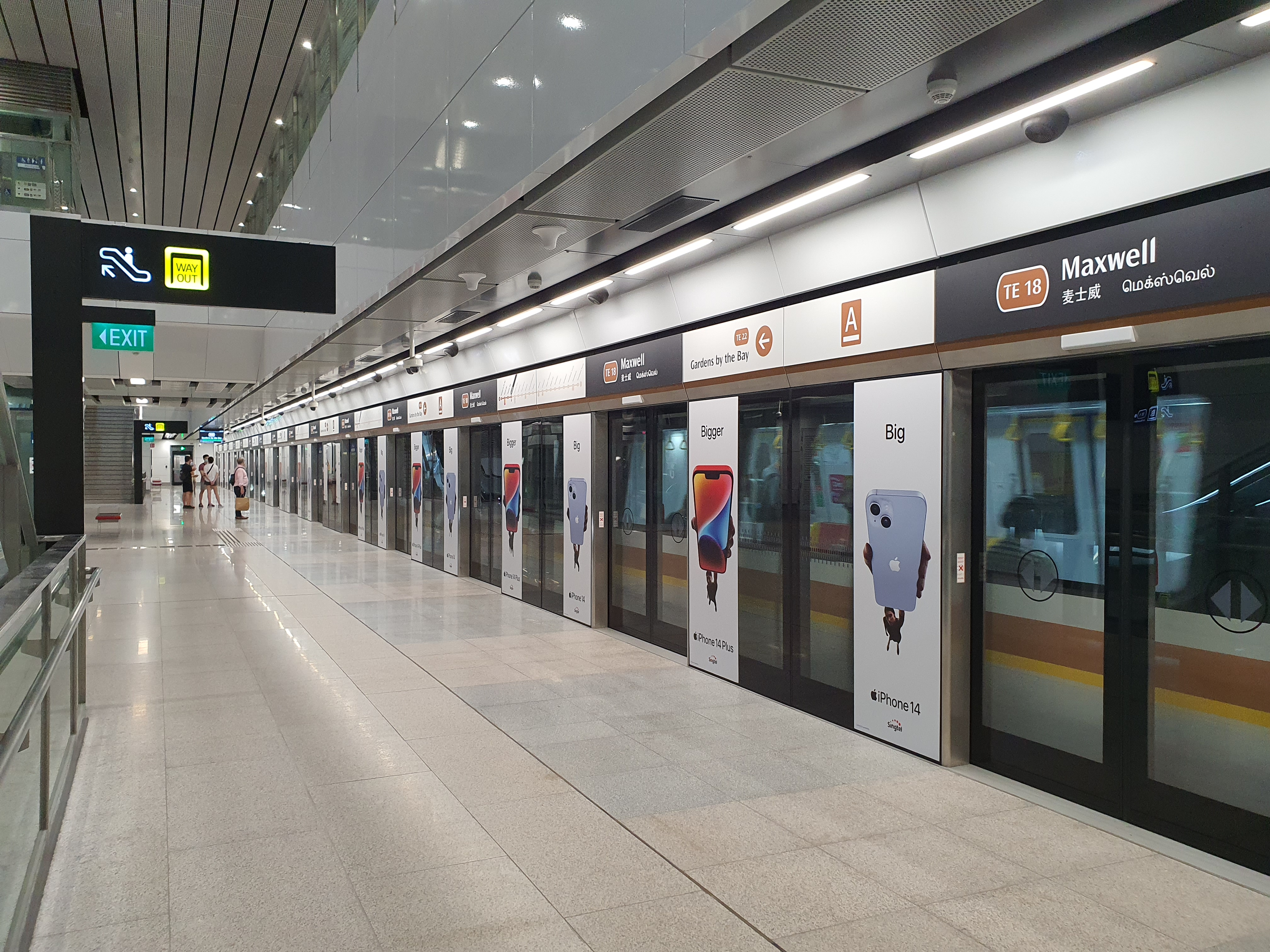
Platform A

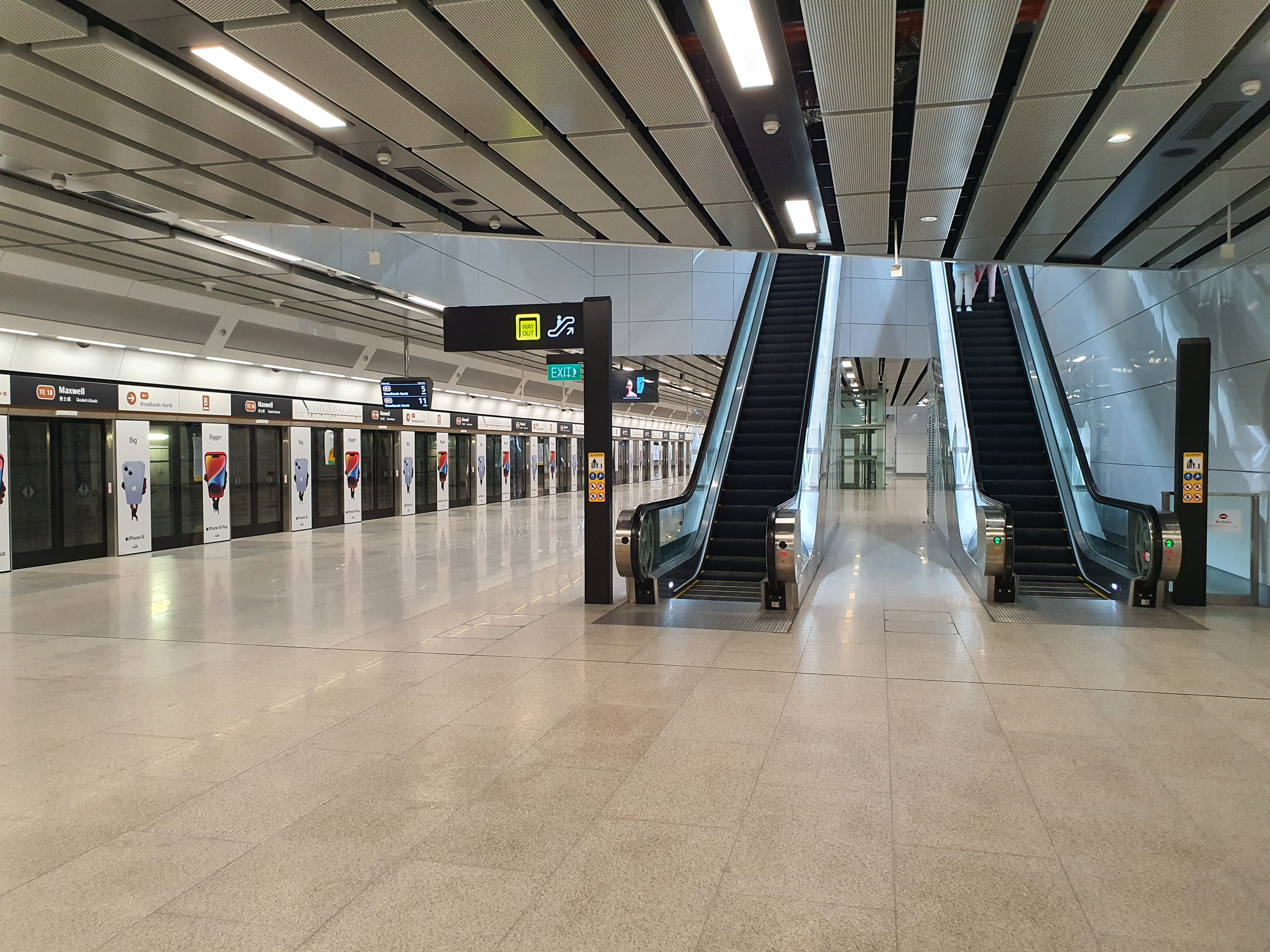
Platform B

Maxwell station serves the TEL and is between the Outram Park and Shenton Way stations. The official station code is TE18. Being part of the TEL, the station is operated by SMRT Trains. Train frequencies on the TEL range from 3 to 6 minutes. The station has a stacked platform layout.

The station is located along Neil Road between Maxwell Road and Kreta Ayer Road. The station serves various developments including the Buddha Tooth Relic Temple & Museum, Masjid Jamae (Chulia), Maxwell Food Centre, Sri Mariamman Temple, Fairfield Methodist Church, Kreta Ayer Community Centre and Sri Layan Sithi Vinayagar Temple. It also serves government institutions such as Central Provident Fund Maxwell Service Centre, Ministry of National Development Building and Urban Redevelopment Authority Centre. The station is also within walking distances to other stations such as Outram Park, Tanjong Pagar, Chinatown and Telok Ayer.

Old Chinatown In New Maxwell Life by Justin Lee is displayed at this station as part of the Art-in-Transit programme. The work depicts various public buildings and people represented of Singapore's rich culture and heritage, including Samsui women and a child eating at a hawker food street. The juxtapositions of styles, such as the child in pointillist style against the computer graphic of the stool, is intended to reflect Singapore's poorer past contrasting its present and highlight issues of inequality and the value of food.
