= Outram Park MRT station =

Mass Rapid Transit station in Singapore

Outram Park EW16 NE3 TE17 欧南园 ஊட்ரம் பார்க்
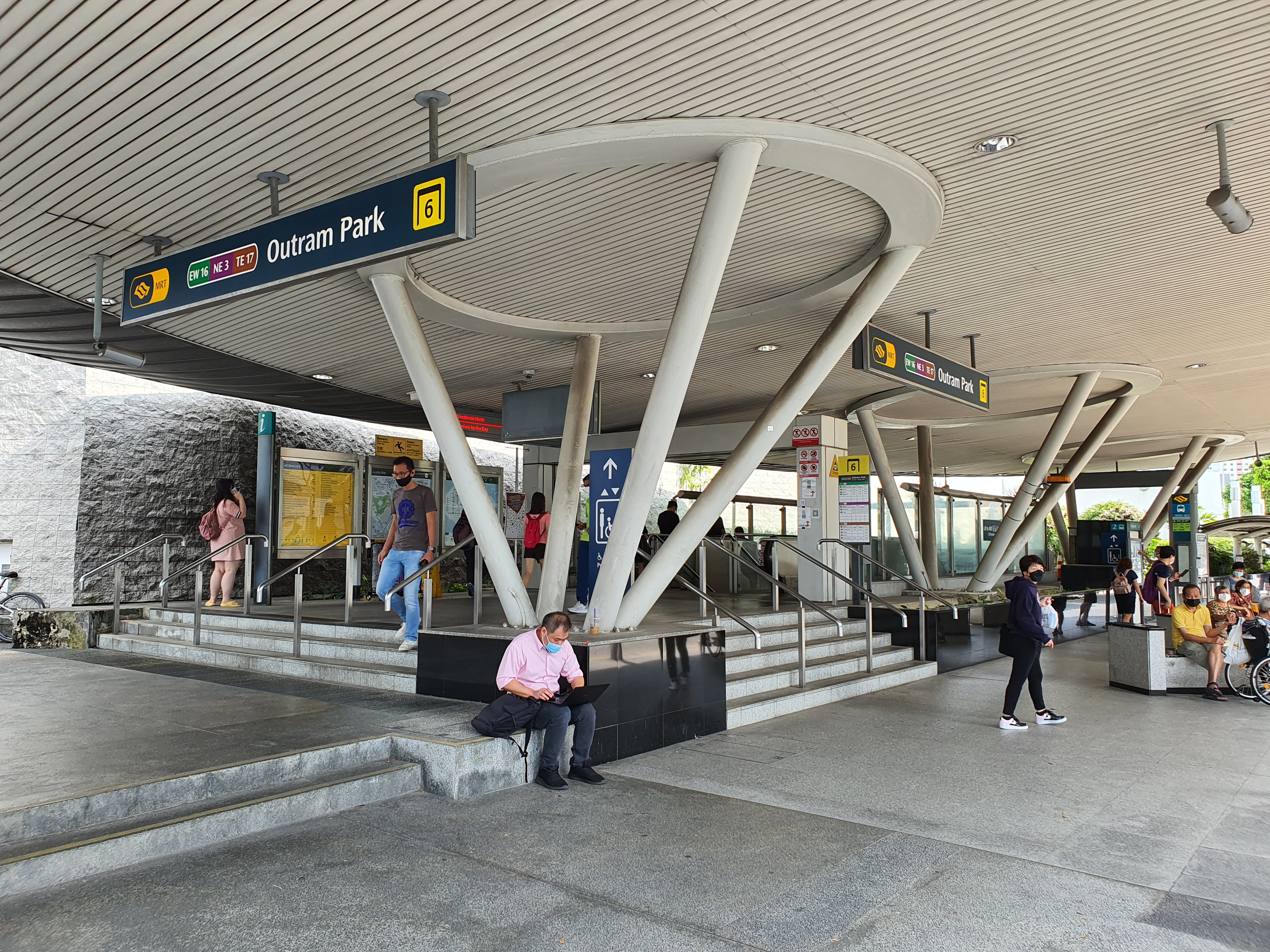
- Exit 6 of Outram Park MRT station

General information
- Location: 10 Outram Road, Singapore 169037 (EWL); 300 Eu Tong Sen Street, Singapore 059816 (NEL); 13 Outram Road, Singapore 169080 (TEL)
- Coordinates: 01°16′50″N 103°50′24″E
- System: Mass Rapid Transit (MRT) interchange
- Owner: Land Transport Authority
- Operator: SMRT Trains (East–West and Thomson–East Coast Lines); SBS Transit (North East Line)
- Line: East–West Line North East Line Thomson–East Coast Line
- Platforms: 6 (3 island platforms)
- Tracks: 6
- Connections: Bus, Taxi

Construction
- Structure type: Underground
- Platform levels: 2
- Parking: Yes (Singapore General Hospital)
- Accessible: Yes

Other information
- Station code: OTP

History
- Opened: 12 December 1987; 38 years ago (East–West Line); 20 June 2003; 23 years ago (North East Line); 13 November 2022; 4 years ago (Thomson–East Coast Line)

Passengers
- June 2024: 29,325 per day

Services
Preceding station	Mass Rapid Transit	Following station
Tanjong Pagar towards Pasir Ris	East–West Line	Tiong Bahru towards Tuas Link
HarbourFront Terminus	North East Line	Chinatown towards Punggol Coast
Havelock towards Woodlands North	Thomson–East Coast Line	Maxwell towards Bayshore
Track layout
Location
- Location within Singapore Rail central area

Outram Park MRT station (Note: /ˈuːtrəm/ OO-trəm, locally also /ˈoʊtrəm, ˈaʊ-/ OH-trəm or OW-trəm) is an underground Mass Rapid Transit (MRT) interchange station in Singapore. The station is on the East–West, North East and Thomson–East Coast lines, and is located near the junction of Outram Road, Eu Tong Sen Street and New Bridge Road on the boundary of Bukit Merah and Outram planning areas. It is the closest MRT station to Singapore General Hospital, the Police Cantonment Complex, Outram Community Hospital and the Health Promotion Board. The station was included in the early plans of the MRT network in 1982; the East–West Line platforms were constructed as part of the Phase I MRT segment from Novena, and were completed in December 1987.

Outram Park station was planned to be the southern terminus of the North East Line before it was extended to the World Trade Centre. Construction of the North East Line station involved a significant traffic diversion at a nearby road intersection, with building works of a linkway connecting both station taking place close to the East–West Line platforms. A tunnel connecting the East–West and North East Line stations was constructed below the former, which involved partially destroying existing platforms while keeping them intact. North East Line platforms opened on 20 June 2003. When the Thomson–East Coast Line opened on 13 November 2022, Outram Park station became a triple-line interchange.

Outram Park station contains three artworks as part of the Art-in-Transit programme, Memories, Commuters and Mata-Mata. Memories uses vivid colours to illustrate the heritage around the station. Commuters is a series of surrealist engravings of humans representing the state of mind of commuters in the station. Mata-Mata is a hand-drawn, crowdsourced visual map of the area around the station.

== History ==
=== Construction and East–West Line ===
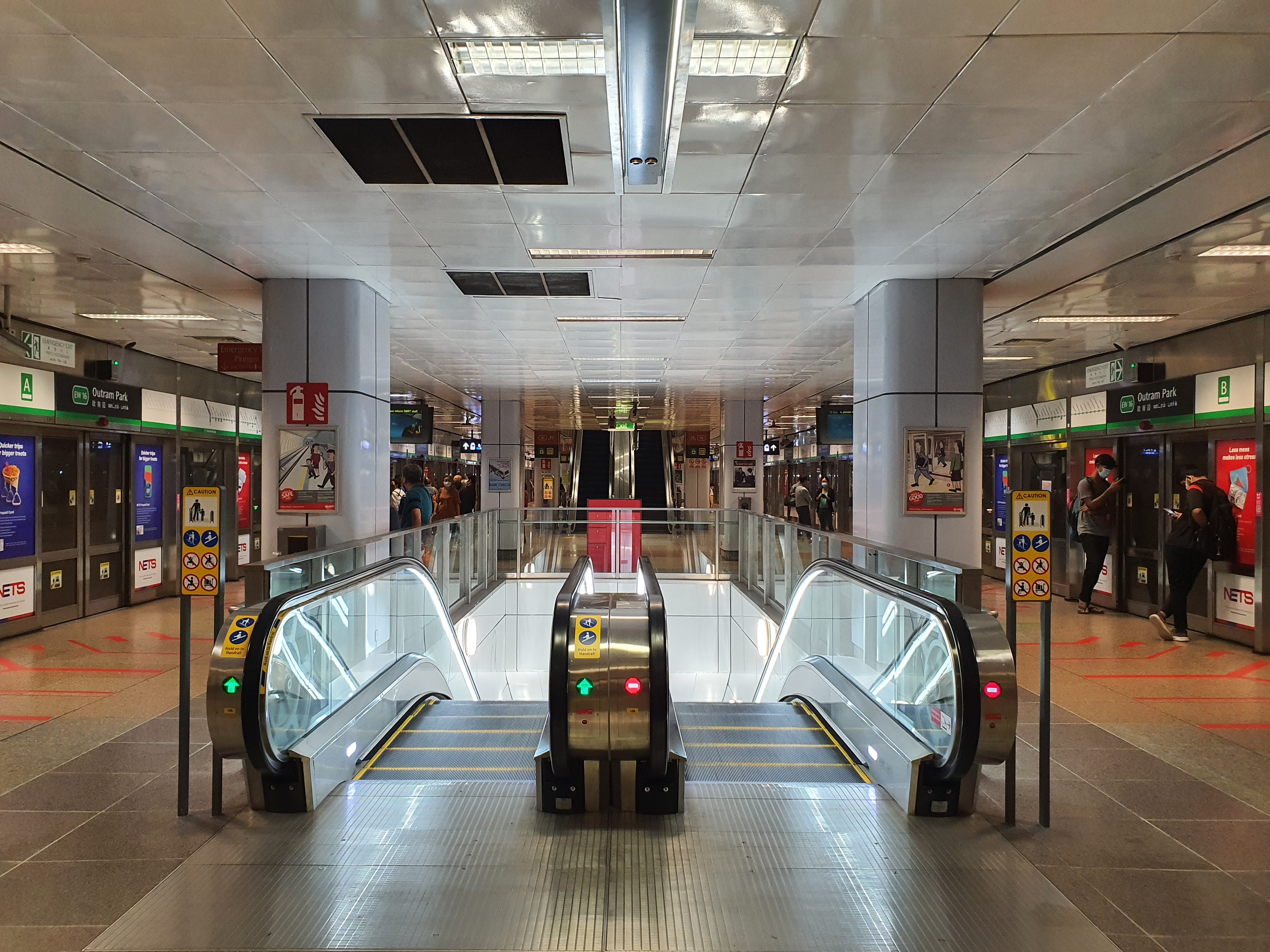
EWL platforms

Outram Park station was included in early plans of the MRT network in May 1982. It was to be constructed as part of the Phase I MRT segment from Novena station, due to be completed by December 1987. The segment was given priority as it traverses areas with a higher demand for public transport, such as the densely populated housing estates of Toa Payoh and Ang Mo Kio, and the Central Area. The line was intended to relieve traffic congestion along the Thomson–Sembawang Road corridor. The contract for the construction of Outram Park station and 4 km (2.5 miles) of tunnels between the Tiong Bahru and Maxwell (now Tanjong Pagar) stations was awarded to Japanese joint venture Ohbayashi-Gumi/Okumura Corporation in November 1983 at a cost of S$73.85 million (US$95 million in 2020).

In 1984, Outram Primary School was closed and merged into Zhangde Primary School to make way for construction works. The tunnel from Outram Park to Tiong Bahru was expected to be completed in September 1984, but was instead completed on 27 May 1985. Train services commenced on 12 December 1987, when the line extension to the station was officially completed. The station was part of a route that continuously ran from Yishun station in the north to Lakeside station in the west. From 28 October 1989, Outram Park station began to serve the East–West Line (EWL) with the operational split of the MRT system. (Note: The MRT system was split into East–West Line running from Tanah Merah to Lakeside stations, and the NSL running from Yishun to Marina Bay stations.)

=== North East Line ===
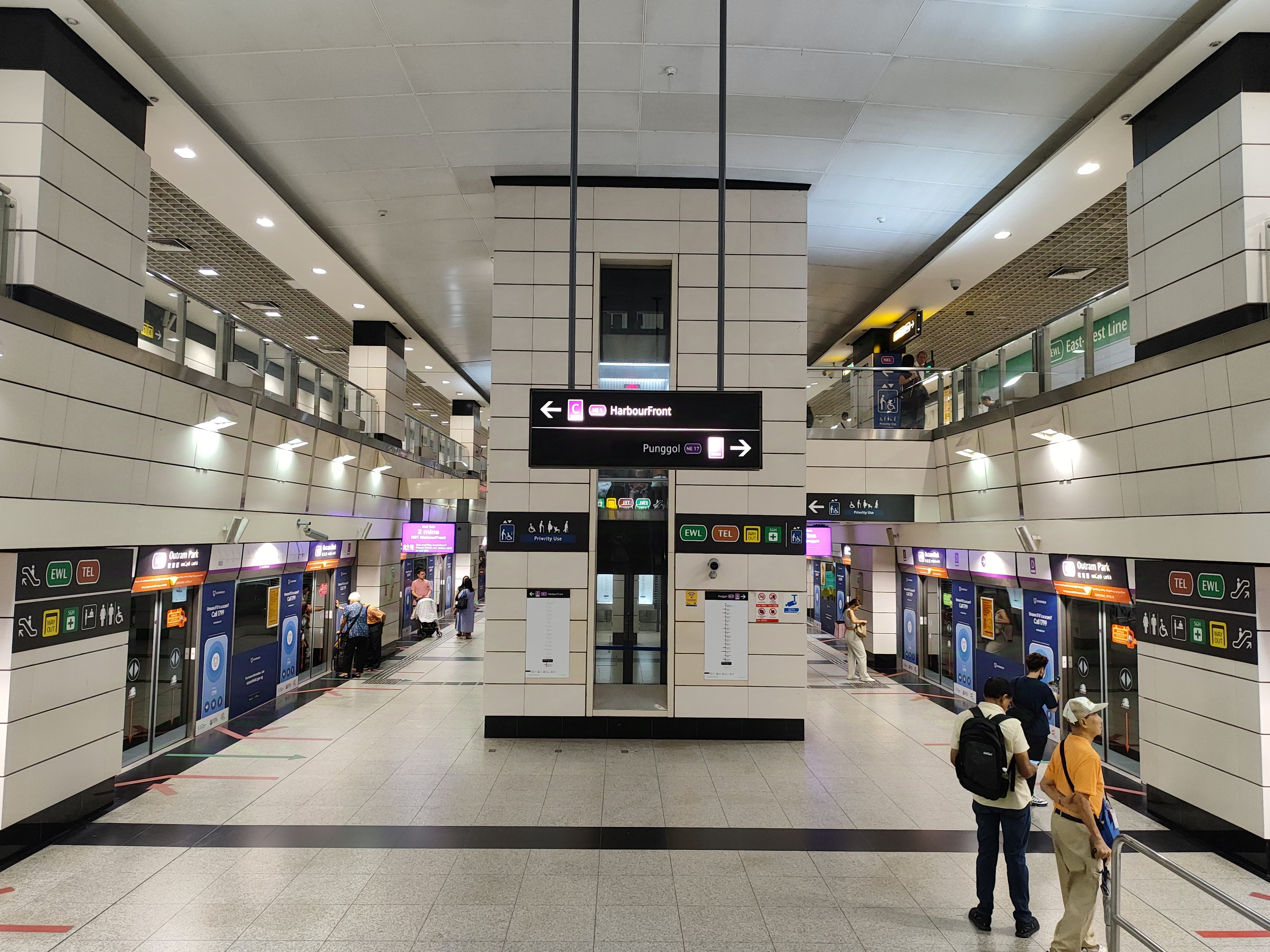
NEL platforms

Preliminary studies for the North East Line (NEL) in 1986 included plans for Outram Park station being the southern terminus of the NEL rather than HarbourFront station. By 1995 the planned line had been extended to include an additional stop, the World Trade Centre MRT station (since renamed HarbourFront). In March 1996, then-Communications Minister Mah Bow Tan confirmed the station would serve the NEL as an interchange.

The NEL station was built on the site of Outram Prison, which was demolished to make way for Housing and Development Board (HDB) developments. To construct the station, the contractor had to design and execute a major traffic diversion at the intersection of Eu Tong Sen Street, Outram Road, Cantonment Road and New Bridge Road, with construction taking place as close as 10 metres (33 ft) away from EWL tunnels. Contract 710 for the construction of Outram Park NEL platforms and associated tunnels was awarded to Shimizu-Dillingham-Koh Brothers Joint Venture.

In order to link the NEL and EWL stations, a passageway opening up under the EWL platform was built. Construction of the passageway lasted from March 2001 to December 2001. Shimizu-Dillingham-Koh Brothers Joint Venture had to "hack away the platforms to create openings in the [linkway] structure". A steel structure was also used to construct the linkway. Nine stages of traffic diversion was carried out to facilitate the construction of the NEL station. A dual-mode tunnel-boring machine was used to construct tunnels to handle the varying soil conditions along their route, a first in Singapore. Hoardings were built near the site of the NEL station to minimise construction noise.

In September 2000, construction of lift access in the station began. EWL station upgrades were completed on 12 October 2002. The NEL station opened on 20 June 2003. On 14 August 2017, two meeting points designated for assistance from commuters called Heart Zones were designated near the EWL and NEL exits as part of a trial to better assist the elderly, frail and disabled commuters. The trial was done as Outram Park station serves the nearby Singapore General Hospital.

=== Thomson–East Coast Line ===
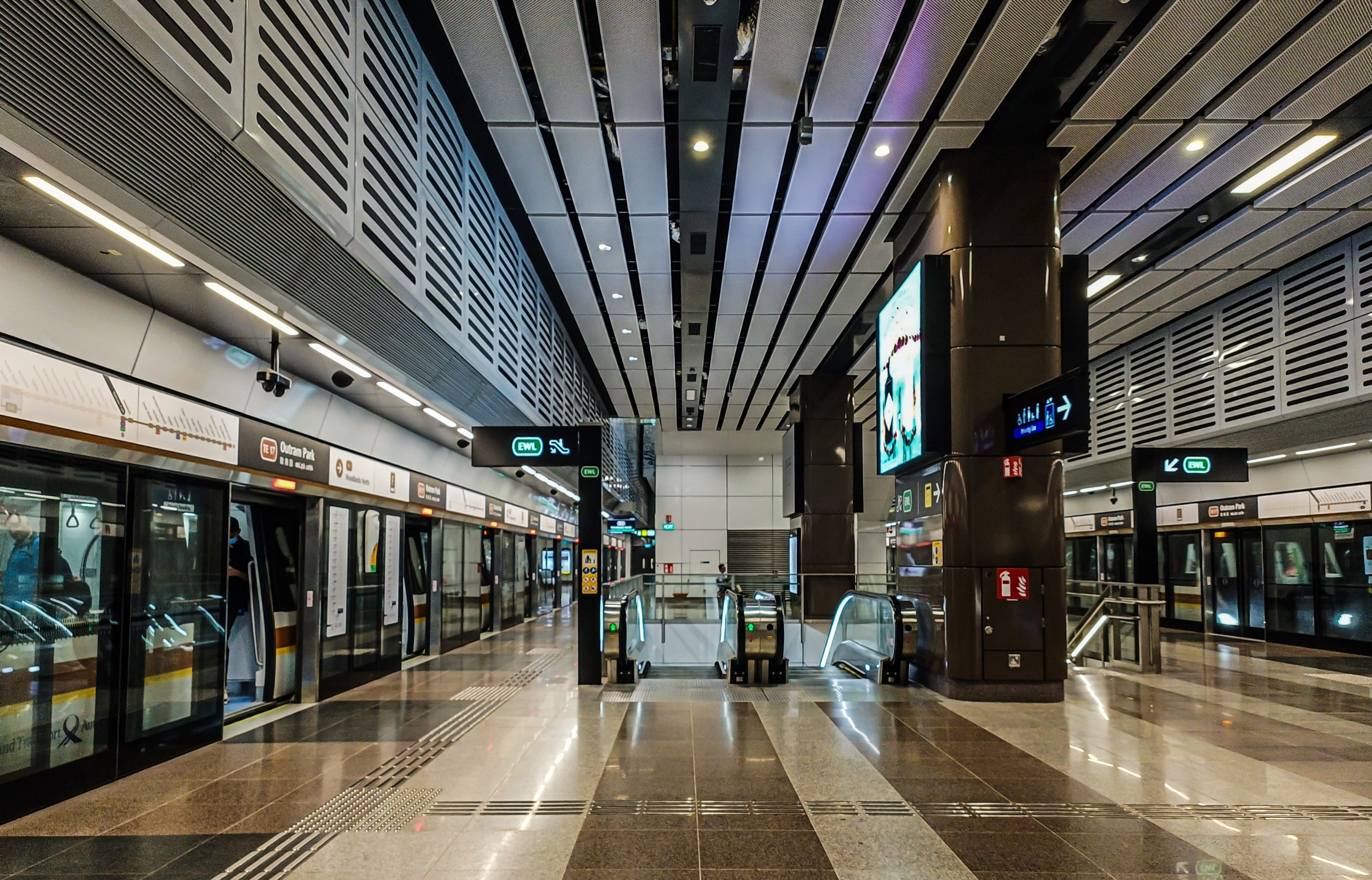
TEL platforms

On 29 August 2012, the Land Transport Authority (LTA) announced Outram Park station would be an interchange with the proposed Thomson Line. At the same time, to facilitate tunnelling works, the Singapore Land Authority announced the acquisition of Pearls Centre, a residential-commercial building, giving residents three years to vacate the premises, By 2015, the tenants and residents of Pearls Centre had been required to vacate the building. The complex was subsequently taken over by the Singapore Land Authority for construction of the Thomson Line and was later demolished. On 15 August 2014, the LTA announced the Thomson Line would be integrated into the Thomson–East Coast Line (TEL). The TEL platform at Outram Park would be constructed as part of Phase 3, a section of the TEL consisting of 13 stations between Mount Pleasant and Gardens by the Bay.

Contract T222 for the construction of Outram Park TEL platform and associated tunnels was awarded to Daelim Industrial Co. Ltd (now DL E&C) at a cost of S$301 million in May 2014. Construction was expected to start in the second quarter of 2014 with completion expected in 2021. With restrictions imposed on the delivery of material and manpower for the station's construction due to the COVID-19 pandemic, the TEL3 completion date was delayed by one year to 2022.

Sedimentary rocks were found at the construction site of the TEL station. To facilitate the construction of the TEL station, a temporary pedestrian overhead bridge had to be removed and a road had to be diverted. The TEL train tunnels were built near existing EWL tunnels; they were tested and monitored for structural integrity during construction. As of December 2022, a new underpass is set to open to allow commuters to cross Outram Road. Additionally, two mined linkways, connecting the NEL and EWL to the TEL respectively, were built through constructing a temporary canopy made of overlapping steel pipes. The NEL–TEL linkway is constructed above the EWL tunnels. It is built with precast concrete segmented rings that are 1 m (3.3 ft) wide and 2.25 mm (0.089 in) thick, and constructed using a pipe roof that covers the linkway. On 9 March 2022, then-Transport Minister S. Iswaran announced in Parliament Phase 3 (Caldecott to Gardens by the Bay via Napier) would open in the second half of 2022. On 7 October 2022, during a visit by Iswaran to Outram Park and Maxwell stations, it was announced by the LTA that the TEL platforms would begin operations on 13 November that year. Following the opening of the TEL platforms, Outram Park station became a triple-line interchange, alongside Marina Bay and Dhoby Ghaut stations.

== Details ==
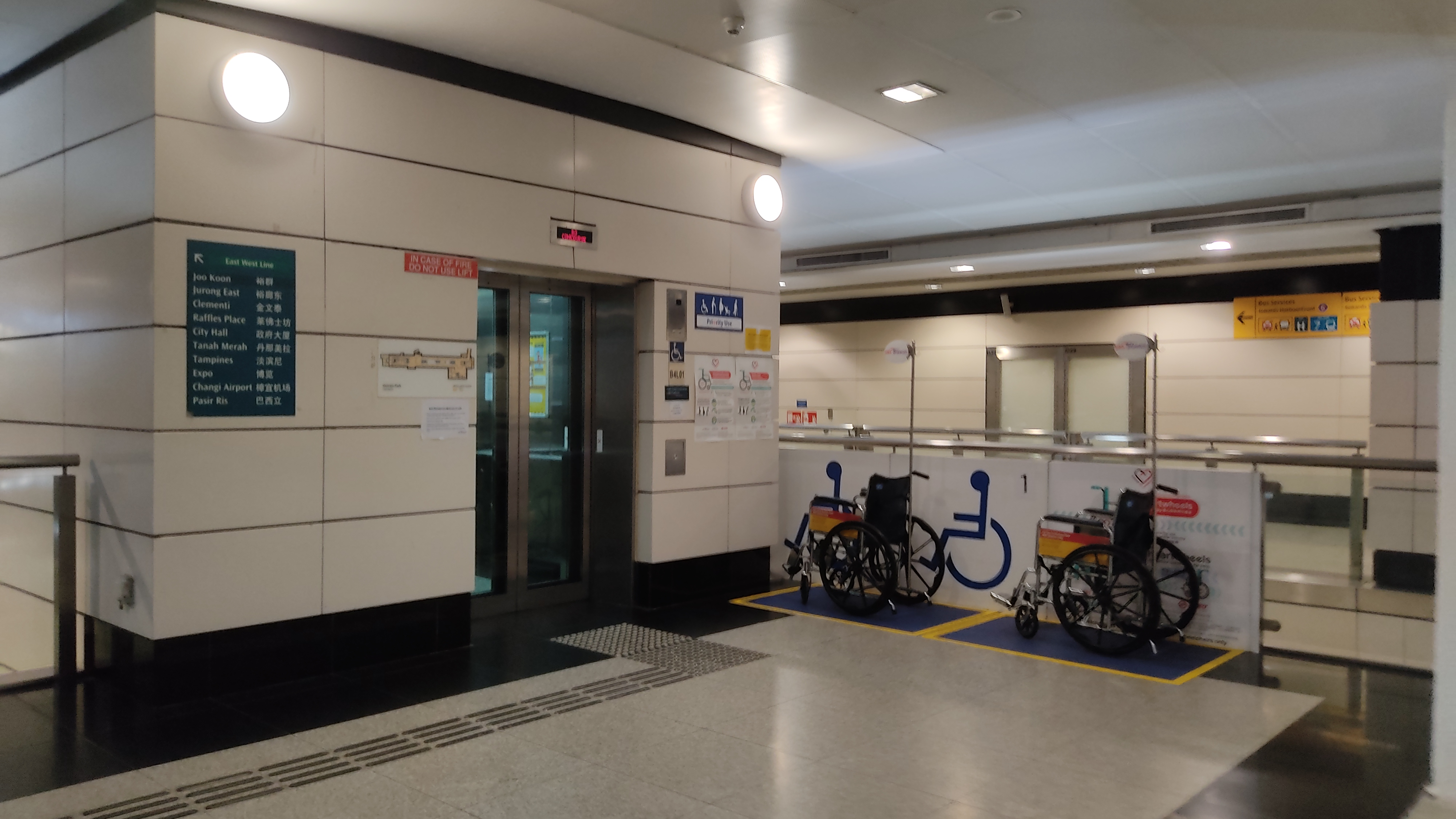
Tactile tiles on the floor linking to the station lift at Outram Park station. The station, being close to Singapore General Hospital, has wheelchairs provided for elderly and disabled commuters.

Outram Park MRT station is located near the junction of Outram Road, Eu Tong Sen Street and New Bridge Road on the boundary of Bukit Merah and Outram planning areas. The station serves several health facilities, such as Singapore General Hospital (SGH), the Ministry of Health building, the National Cancer Centre, the Health Sciences Authority, National Dental Center, Outram Community Hospital and the Health Promotion Board. It also serves Cantonment Primary School. The NEL station is 27 metres (89 ft) deep and has four underground levels, with the second level being out-of-bounds to commuters and the first intended for a public underpass. It is also connected to the EWL and TEL stations via a linkway. The EWL and TEL stations are directly connected to each other, via another linkway directly below the EWL and TEL platforms.

The NEL station is designated as a Civil Defence (CD) shelter. It is designed to accommodate at least 7,500 people and withstand airstrikes and chemical attacks. Equipment essential for the operations in the CD shelter is mounted on shock absorbers to prevent damage during a bombing. When electrical supply to the shelter is disrupted, there are backup generators to keep operations going. The shelter has dedicated built-in decontamination chambers and dry toilets with collection bins that will send human waste out of the shelter.

The station has accessibility features. The EWL station, initially without accessible facilities, has been upgraded to include lifts, ramps and dedicated toilets for the disabled. A tactile system, consisting of tiles with rounded or elongated raised studs, guides visually impaired commuters through the station, with dedicated routes that connect the station entrances to the platforms or between the lines. Wider fare gates allow easier access for wheelchair users into the station. As part of Heartwheels @ Linkway – a collaborative initiative between the Public Transport Council, SBS Transit, SMRT and SGH – wheelchairs are also provided in the station for elderly and disabled commuters requiring assistance to get to SGH. As of September 2020, the initiative is still ongoing.

=== Services ===
Outram Park station is an interchange station on the EWL, the NEL and the TEL. Its code is EW16/NE3/TE17. When it opened, it had the station code of W2, before being changed to the current alphanumeric style in August 2001, as a part of a system-wide campaign to cater to the expanding MRT system. On the EWL, Outram Park station is located between Tanjong Pagar and Tiong Bahru stations. On the NEL, the station is located between HarbourFront and Chinatown stations. On the TEL, the station is between Havelock and Maxwell stations. On average, the station serves 29,325 passengers every day. Outram Park station is named 欧南园 (Ōunányuán) in Chinese and ஊட்ரம் பார்க் (Ūṭram Pārk) in Tamil.

As of October 2024, EWL trains operate in both directions every 2–5 minutes from 5:39 a.m. (6:09 a.m. on Sundays and public holidays) to 12:10 a.m. On the NEL, the station is located between HarbourFront and Chinatown stations. NEL trains operate in both directions every 2–5 minutes from 5:30 a.m. to 12:15 a.m. On the TEL, the station is located between Havelock and Maxwell stations, with headways of 3–6 minutes from 5:30 a.m. to 12:35 a.m.

== Artworks ==
Three artworks are displayed at Outram Park station commissioned as part of the Art-in-Transit programme, a showcase of public artworks on the MRT network.

Memories by Wang Lu Sheng uses bold colours inspired by the area's cultural heritage, especially Chinese culture. One of the pieces depicts Chinese opera and law or medicine, and represents visual memories of the surrounding area. When creating Memories, Wang wanted to "create lively, vibrant images" that can grab the eyes of the commuters, even if they "only have 30 seconds to spare". He also was "led by the nature of the station spaces", as well as the history around Outram Park station. He worked with historical images of the area, which included old images of Singapore General Hospital and policemen, as well as indulging in the aspects of life at Outram Park and consulting clan association leaders and members of musical and cultural groups. These images were implanted using x-rays onto nine medallions modelled after the human head. Canadian wall panel manufacturer PG Bell helped fabricate Wang's designs in silkscreen on vitreous enamel.

Commuters by Teo Eng Seng consists of 69 engravings of surreal human forms that represent commuters' states of mind. Teo focused on the commuters' sentiments and thoughts going through the MRT system, homing in on the "public nature" of the Art-in-Transit programme. The human forms appear to blend into or emerge out of the wall, making them discernible at any point in time, enticing commuters to interact with them. One form, a child traveling to see a sick family member, represents Teo's ability to "[pick] out life's little quirks and foibles and getting a chuckle out of it". During the creation of Commuters, Teo had to work six days a week for nine months, with Andrew Mead, then-manager of the Art-in-Transit programme saying that "it was back-breaking work but [Teo] always had a smile on his face".

Mata-Mata (stylised in lowercase) by Hafiz Ozman is a "visual map" of the area around the station, celebrating the wide array of things that make up the community space of Outram Park. During the making of this artwork, the public were encouraged to submit photos of that era, which are subsequently converted to drawings by the artist.

== Notes and references ==
=== Bibliography ===
- Leong, Chan Teik (2003). Getting There: The Story of the North East Line. Singapore: Land Transport Authority. ISBN 981-04-5886-X. OCLC 53383062.
- Tan, Su (2003). Art in Transit: North East Line MRT. Singapore: Land Transport Authority. ISBN 981-04-7384-2. OCLC 52771106.
