= One Raffles Quay =

Office skyscraper in Singapore

- 莱佛士码头一号
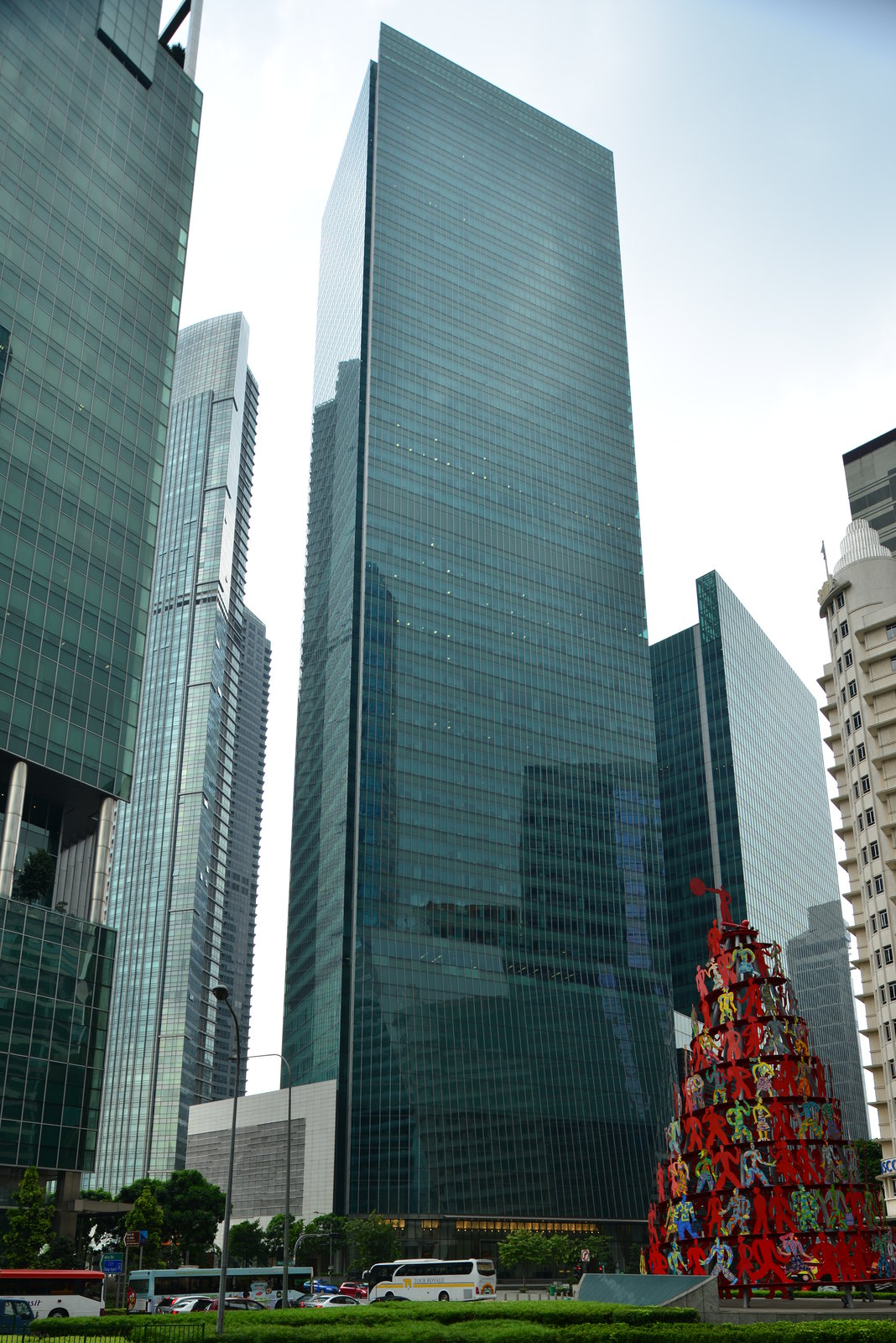

- Location within Singapore

General information
- Type: Commercial offices
- Location: Singapore
- Coordinates: 1.2816°N 103.8522°E
- Owner: Hongkong Land, K-REIT Asia and Suntec REIT
- Operator: Raffles Quay Asset Management

Height
- Roof: North Tower: 245 m (804 ft); South Tower: 139.9 m (459 ft)

Technical details
- Floor count: North Tower: 50; South Tower: 29
- Floor area: 234,000 m^{2} (2,520,000 sq ft)

Design and construction
- Architects: Kohn Pedersen Fox; Architects 61
- Developer: Cheung Kong (Holdings) Limited, Hongkong Land and Keppel Land
- Main contractor: Obayashi Corporation

Website
- www.orq.com.sg

One Raffles Quay (Chinese: 莱佛士码头一号) is an office building complex located at Raffles Place, the central business district of Singapore.

Designed by Kohn Pedersen Fox, One Raffles Quay (ORQ) consists of the 50-storey North Tower and the 29-storey South Tower, totalling about 1.3 million square feet of office space. The building was purpose-built for banking and financial corporations in August 2006.

ORQ is home to international banks such as Barclays Capital, UniCredit, Credit Suisse, Deutsche Bank AG, Societe Generale Private Banking and UBS, headquarters of cryptocurrency exchange crypto.com as well as professional services firms Thomson Reuters, Ernst & Young, QBE Insurance and leading global financial markets infrastructure and data provider LSEG. It also has amenities and is directly linked to Raffles Place MRT station via its own exit (Exit J) or other retail underpasses, and can be accessed from Downtown MRT station at ground level, by Marina Bay Suites. One Raffles Quay also has an internal overground linkway that links the One Raffles Quay underpass to The Sail, ground level, and IOI Central Boulevard Towers.

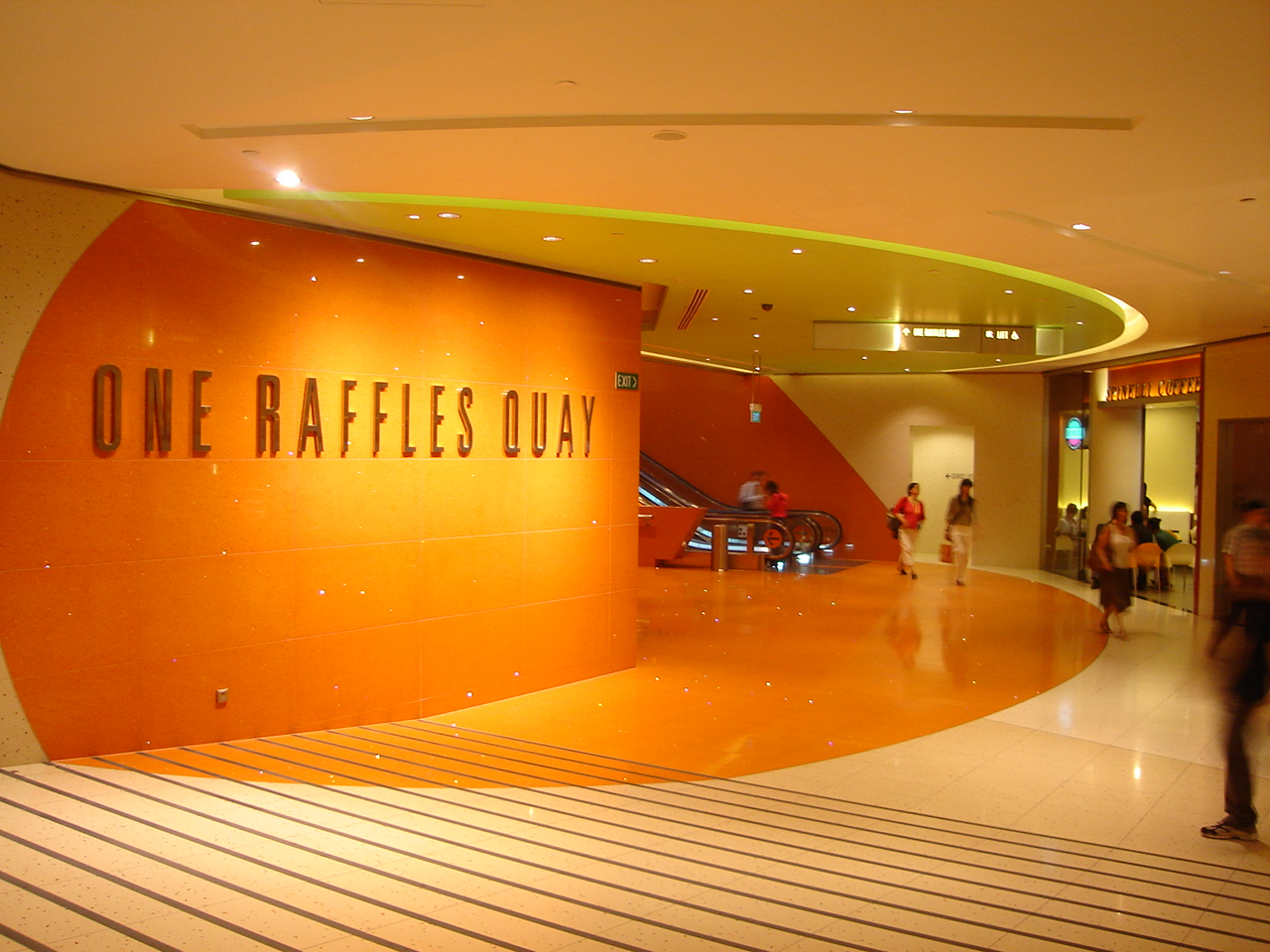
Pedestrian underpass to MRT Station and shops

== See also ==
- Tall buildings in Singapore
- List of tallest buildings in the world
