= Asia Square =

Mixed-use development in Singapore

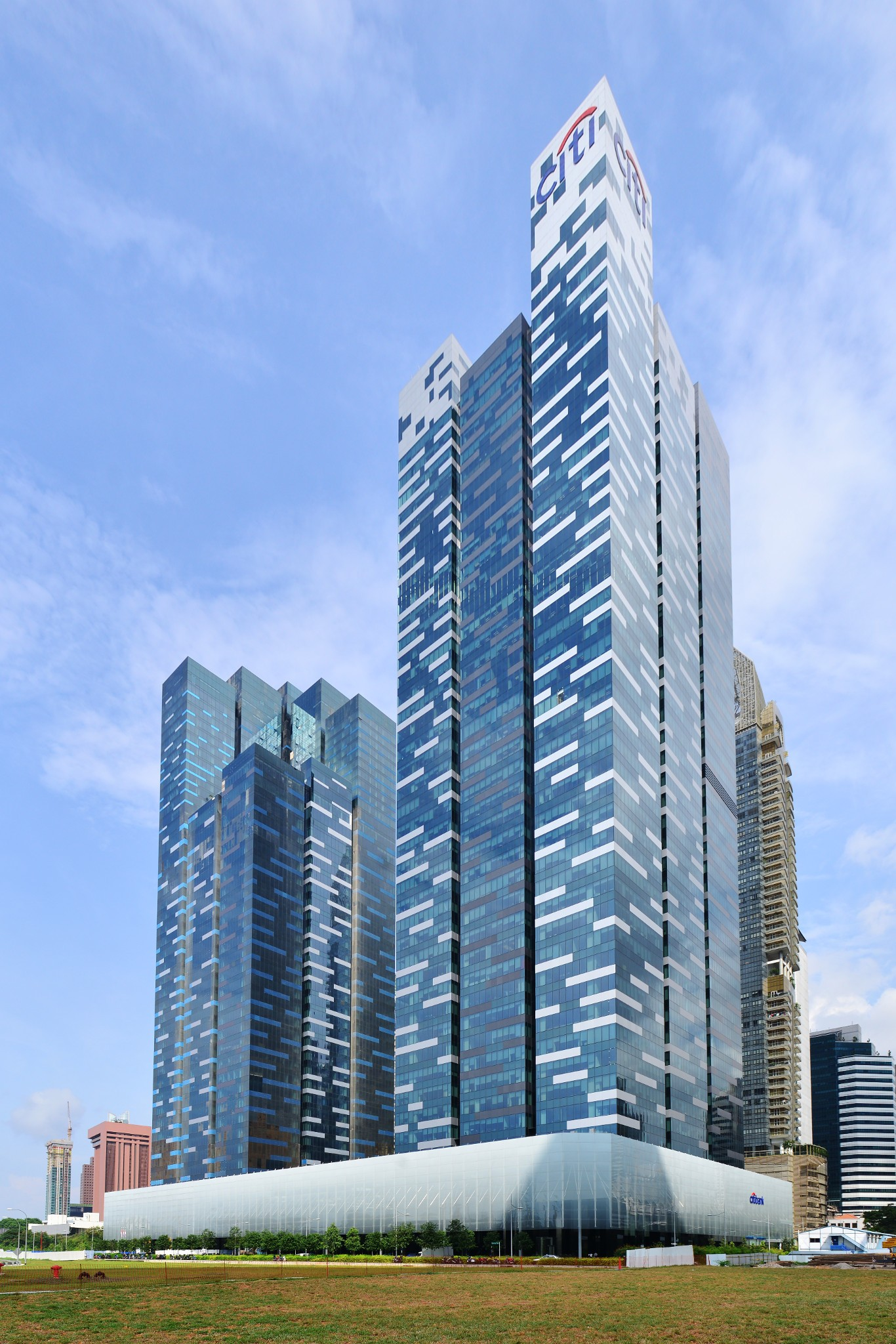
- Interactive map of the Asia Square area

General information
- Status: Completed
- Type: High-rise office, retail, hotel
- Location: Marina Bay, Singapore
- Coordinates: 1°16′42.56″N 103°51′3.6″E
- Construction started: 2009
- Completed: 2013
- Owner: Tower 1: BlackRock; Tower 2: BlackRock

Height
- Roof: Tower 1: 228.95 metres (751.1 ft), Tower 2: 221.48 metres (726.6 ft)

Technical details
- Floor count: Tower 1: 43, Tower 2: 46

Design and construction
- Architect: Denton Corker Marshall

Other information
- Public transit access: TE19 Shenton Way

Website
- www.thehumanbuilding.com

Asia Square is a retail and office building located along Marina View at Marina Bay in Singapore. It is located in Marina Bay, Singapore's new business and financial precinct. It comprises 2,000,000 square feet (190,000 m^{2}) of office space, over 30 entertainment and dining premises, as well as the largest gym in the Central Business District.

Asia Square is also Singapore's first commercial development integrated with a business hotel, The Westin Singapore, located at Tower 2. A 100,000 square feet (9,300 m^{2}) landscaped plaza, The Cube, links the two towers at Asia Square.

In addition, various linkways connect Asia Square to external developments. Asia Square is connected to TE19 Shenton Way MRT via a ground-level exit. A second linkway bridge connects Asia Square to IOI Central Boulevard Towers.

== History ==
Asia Square Tower 1, which consists of 43 floors, was officially opened on 8 November 2011 by Emeritus Senior Minister Goh Chok Tong. The Honorary Consulate of Slovenia is on the ninth floor of this building.

Asia Square Tower 2, which consists of 46 floors, was officially opened on 19 November 2013.

=== Proposed acquisition of Asia Square Tower 1 ===
On 14 October 2015, CapitaLand and a consortium of Norway's sovereign wealth fund has been chosen as the preferred bidder to buy the Asia Square Tower 1 office building. On 4 November 2015, CapitaLand has pulled out of talks on the acquisition. BlackRock Real Estate mentioned talks with other parties are still in progress.

On 6 June 2016, Qatar Investment Authority, a sovereign wealth fund, has agreed to purchase the building for S$3.4 billion.

== Tenants ==
Citi is the anchor tenant for Asia Square Tower 1, giving Citi the right to external signage on the building. Tower 1 houses Citi Asia Pacific, Citi Singapore headquarters and Citi Private Bank. Other Tower 1 tenants include the global investment bank New State Corporation, the Taipei-based Global Financial Services Group CTBC Bank at #33-02, China Citic Bank International, Julius Baer, China Fortune Land Development's international HQ, the Swiss National Bank, Bank Sarasin, Lloyd's of London, Marsh & McLennan, White & Case, Booz Allen Hamilton, Royal Bank of Canada, Fidelity and Sinochem. Leading service office Regus has set up a business centre on level 7. A fitness brand from Hong Kong occupies the entire level 6 at Asia Square Tower 1, a total of 32,000 square feet (3,000 m^{2}), said to be Singapore's largest gym.

Tenants of Asia Square Tower 2 include: Mizuho, Allianz, Westpac, Bank Mandiri, JustCo, Mercuria Energy Trading, National Australia Bank, Nikko Asset Management, Edrington, Platinum Equity Advisors, The Work Project, Pepper Global, Russell Reynolds and Swiss Re.

== Environmental sustainable design ==
The development incorporates several environmental sustainable features. It has the largest photovoltaic cell (solar panel) installation on the roof in Singapore and also the first bio-diesel generation plant in a commercial development in the CBD.

Asia Square achieved both the Leadership in Energy & Environmental Design Core and Shell (LEED-CS) Platinum certification by the US Green Building Council and Green Mark Platinum Award by the Building and Construction Authority of Singapore, making it one of Asia's greenest buildings.

== See also ==
- List of tallest buildings in Singapore
