= Art and architecture on the Mass Rapid Transit (Singapore) =

Art and architecture on the Mass Rapid Transit (MRT) of Singapore have developed progressively since the system's inception. The stations on the initial network, the North–South and East–West lines, were built with simple and functional designs that prioritised cost efficiency and safety. As the network expanded, architectural themes were introduced, with varied roof structures. These include either giving stations an "ethnic touch", such as Chinese style roofs at Chinese Garden station and a Minangkabau design at Eunos station, or to simply enhance visual appeal, as seen in the cylindrical roof design of EWL stations in eastern Singapore. Newer stations incorporated barrier free features such as lifts and tactile guidance routes, while overall designs evolved to reflect more contemporary architectural trends.

The early MRT network also included murals and sculptures that depicted the history or activities of the areas surrounding the stations, although these artworks were not part of the original station plans. In 1997, the Art in Transit (AIT) programme was launched, beginning with the North East Line (NEL). The programme integrates artworks directly into station design and has since commissioned over 300 works for 80 stations across the NEL, the Circle Line (CCL), the Downtown Line (DTL) and the Thomson–East Coast Line (TEL), with future works planned for the Jurong Region (JRL) and Cross Island (CRL) lines. The initiative aims to enhance the commuting experience, foster a sense of identity and provide a platform to showcase local artistry, connecting commuters to Singapore's histories, geographies and communities.

== North–South and East–West lines ==
A variety of architecture on the NSEWL stations

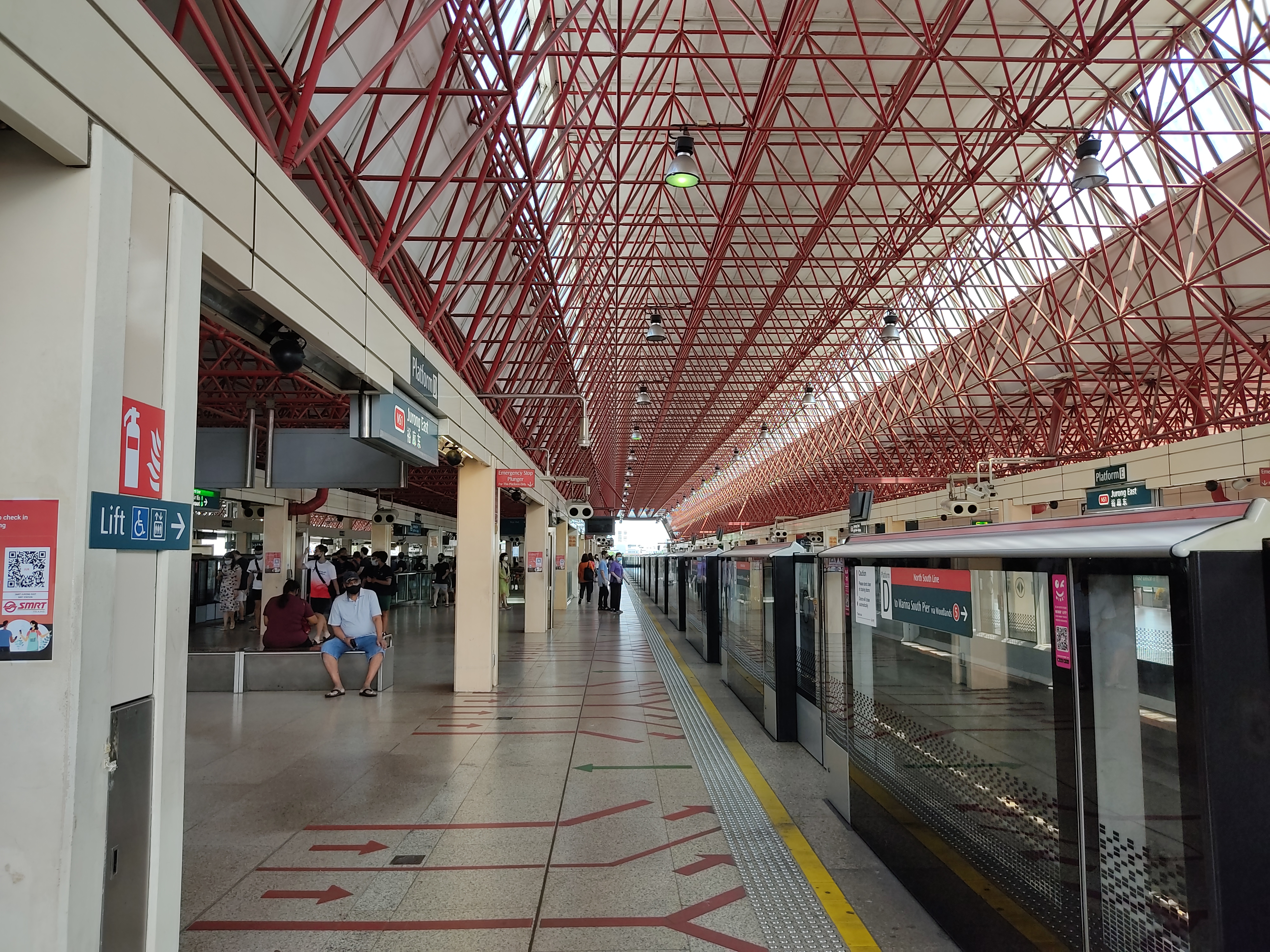
The space-frame roof at Jurong East station.

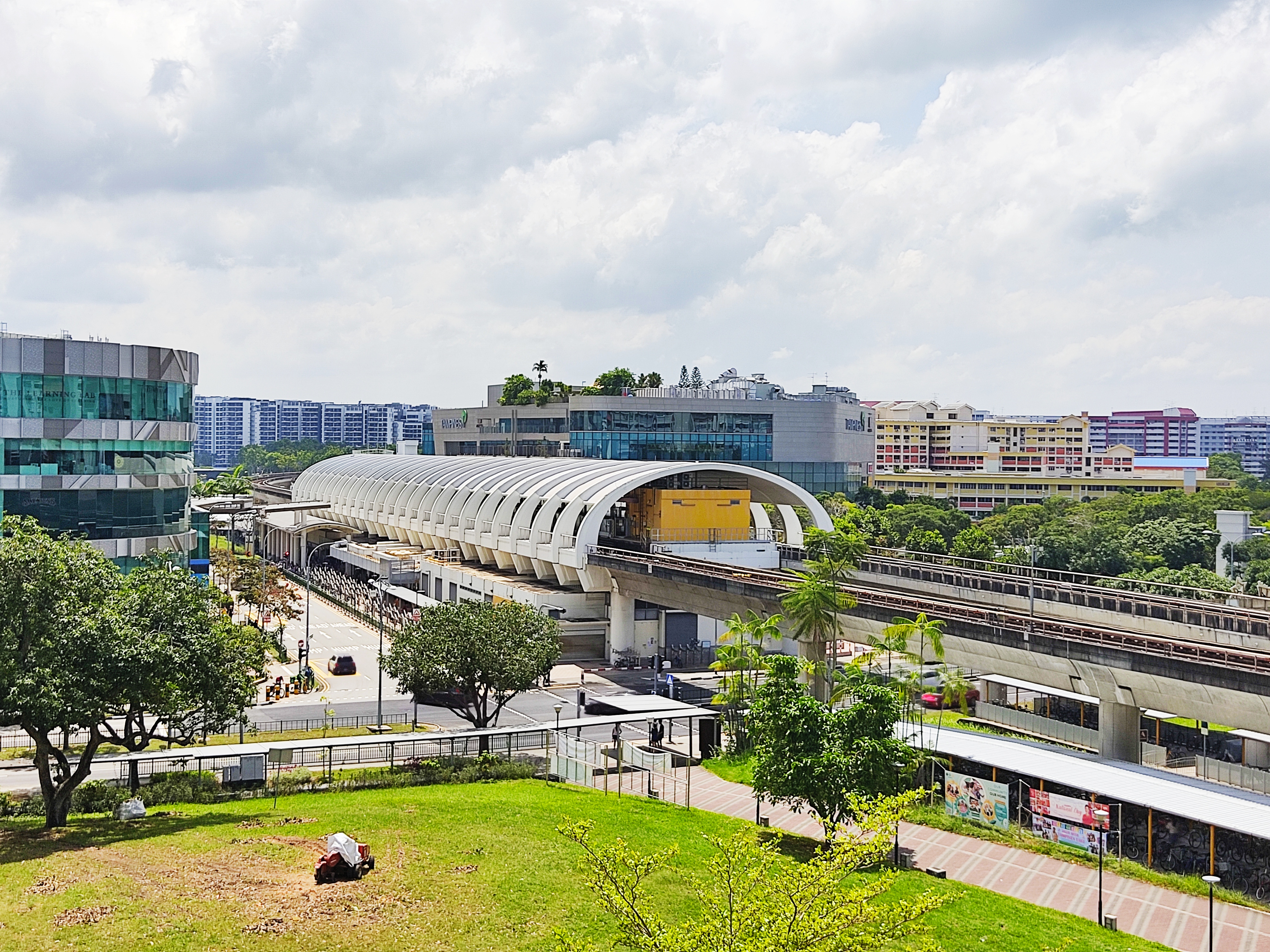
The segmented dome-shaped roof over the platforms of Tampines station

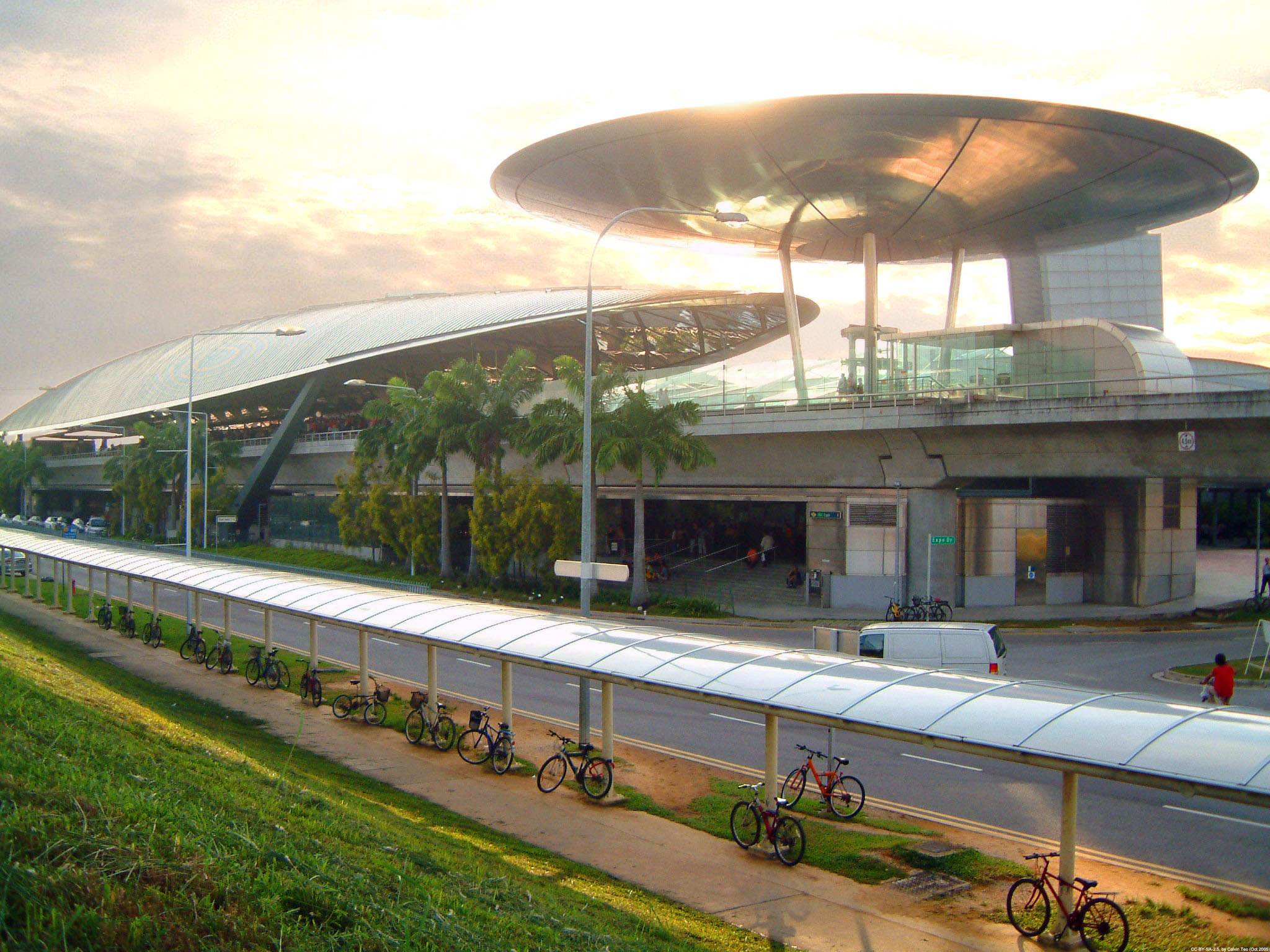
Two overlapping steel roofs over the platforms of Expo station, designed by Foster and Partners.

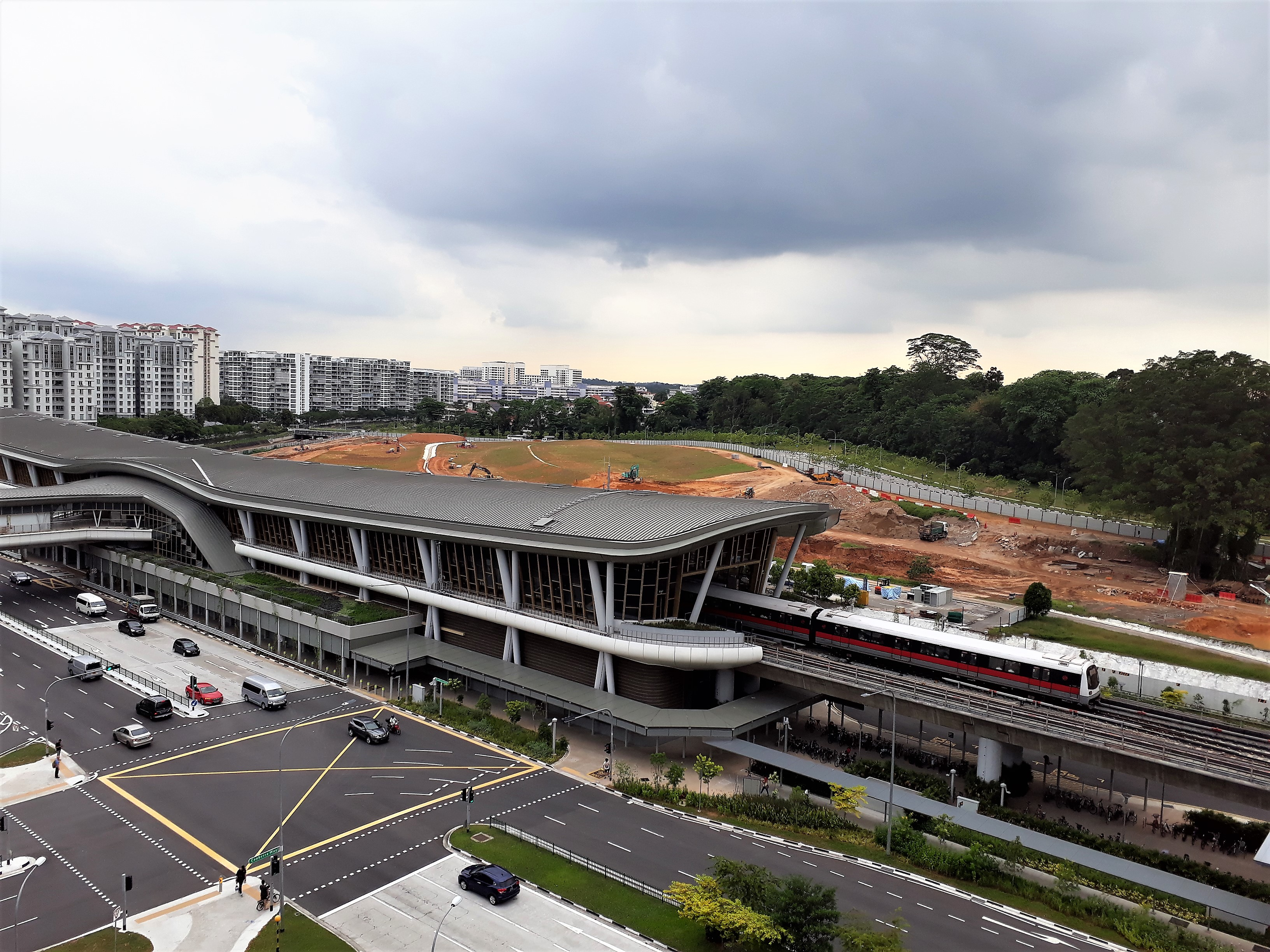
The exterior of Canberra station shaped like a ship.

The initial stations on the first MRT lines in Singapore have simple designs, with more focus on engineering and safety using simple aesthetics. One main concern back then (and still is) has been crowd movement. The size of the station platforms and the width and height of the entrances have been carefully conceptualised to ensure enhanced passenger movement in the network. Nevertheless, some of these stations have artworks reflecting the area they serve, and key features were employed for the underground stations in the Central Business District (CBD). One example is the distinctive dome above Orchard station, which is featured as the "showpiece" for the MRT network. Each station also has a colour scheme which distinguishes them from one another.

In the later Phase II of the network, the roofs of the elevated stations have distinct designs which reflect Singapore's heritage and the surroundings, proposed by architect Scott Danielson. The Lakeside and Chinese Garden stations have curved Chinese roofs similar to the structures in Chinese Garden, while Eunos station has a Malay-style roof to reflect the locality of Geylang Serai, a Malay enclave. The roof of Jurong East station, meanwhile, is similar in design to the adjacent Jurong East Bus Interchange: a space frame roof made up of cylindrical steel tubes with ball joints arranged in a geometric style. On the eastern stretch of the MRT network from the Kallang to Pasir Ris stations, the elevated stations have a dome-shaped roof, segmented like a caterpillar, over the platforms. The design was intended by the MRT Corporation (MRTC) to give the stations on the EWL stations an "attractive look".

In 2025, the LTA announced that 40 older stations on the North–South and East–West lines will gain public artworks, as part of expansion of the Art in Transit programme.

=== Changi Airport branch (2001) ===
The elevated Expo station is designed by British architectural firm Foster and Partners. The station features two roofs overlapping one another — a stainless-steel roof over the concourse and ticket level 40 metres (130 ft) in diameter, and a 130-metre (430 ft) long titanium roof stretching over the platform level. The former reflects sunlight into the concourse which minimises the need for artificial lighting, while the latter deflects sun rays, which cools the platform by up to four degrees less than its surroundings. These materials for the roof were adapted to fit into warm tropical Singaporean climate. The spacious interior of the station allows natural lighting and ventilation. Its futuristic design reflects the country's willingness to experiment with new ideas and technology, symbolising the "thriving world-class city" that Singapore was building for in the 21st century.

Various features have been incorporated into the design to make Changi Airport station aesthetically pleasing to travellers. The station is designed by architectural firm Skidmore, Owings and Merrill, featuring a large interior space and an illuminated 150 m (490 ft) linkbridge spanning over the island platform. Australian engineering company Meinhardt Facades also provided structural design engineering of the glazing system and the tensioned cable structure of the two atria (approximately 60 m (200 ft) long by 20 m (66 ft) wide by 36 m (118 ft) high each) located at both ends of the station box adjacent to Terminal 2 and 3 of Changi Airport, with engineering input by Ove Arup and Partners. In 2011, the station was rated 10 out of 15 most beautiful subway stops in the world by BootsnAll.

=== Dover station (2001) ===
Dover station was designed by RSP Architects. At a height of 21 metres (69 ft), the three-level station has an arched metal roof supported by stainless steel columns to give a more spacious interior. The station concourse level was clad in floor-to-ceiling glass panels.

=== Canberra station (2019) ===
Canberra station was designed by RSP Architects and KTP Consultants (the latter of which is now a subsidiary of Surbana Jurong). The design has a nautical theme; thus, the station is shaped like a ship when viewed from the outside. This design was inspired by Sembawang's historical role as a British naval base. The station’s roof is modeled after wind blades to convey the speed of Singapore's public transportation. The sides of the station were constructed using glass rather than concrete to allow natural light to enter. Louvres were installed to provide ventilation. For the construction team's efforts to integrate landscaping and the use of eco-friendly materials, the station was awarded a Platinum certification under the Building and Construction Authority's new Green Mark scheme for transit stations. Canberra station is the first MRT station to attain such a rating.

== North East Line ==
Station architecture

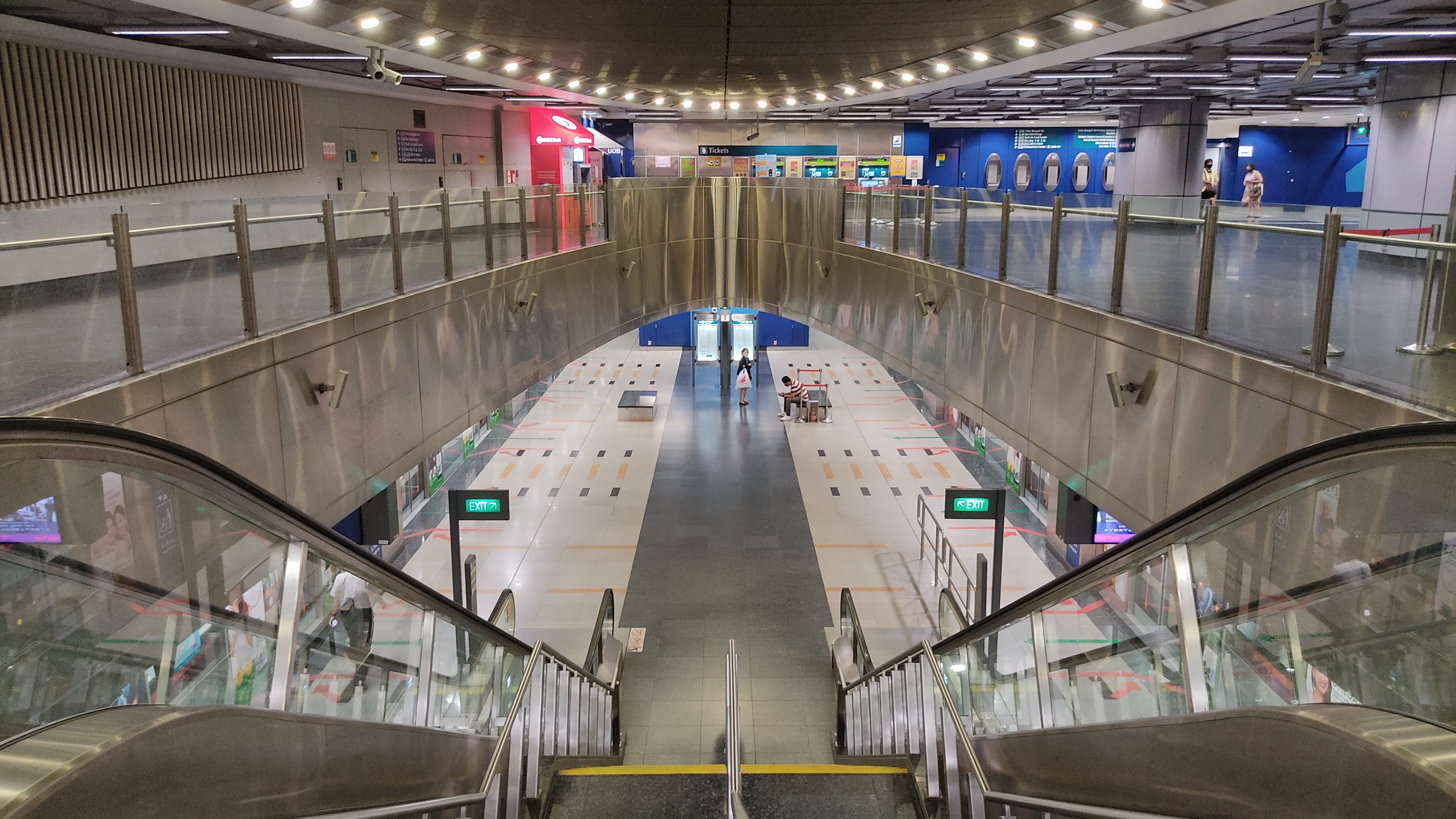
HarbourFront station, with its elliptical ship-hull motif

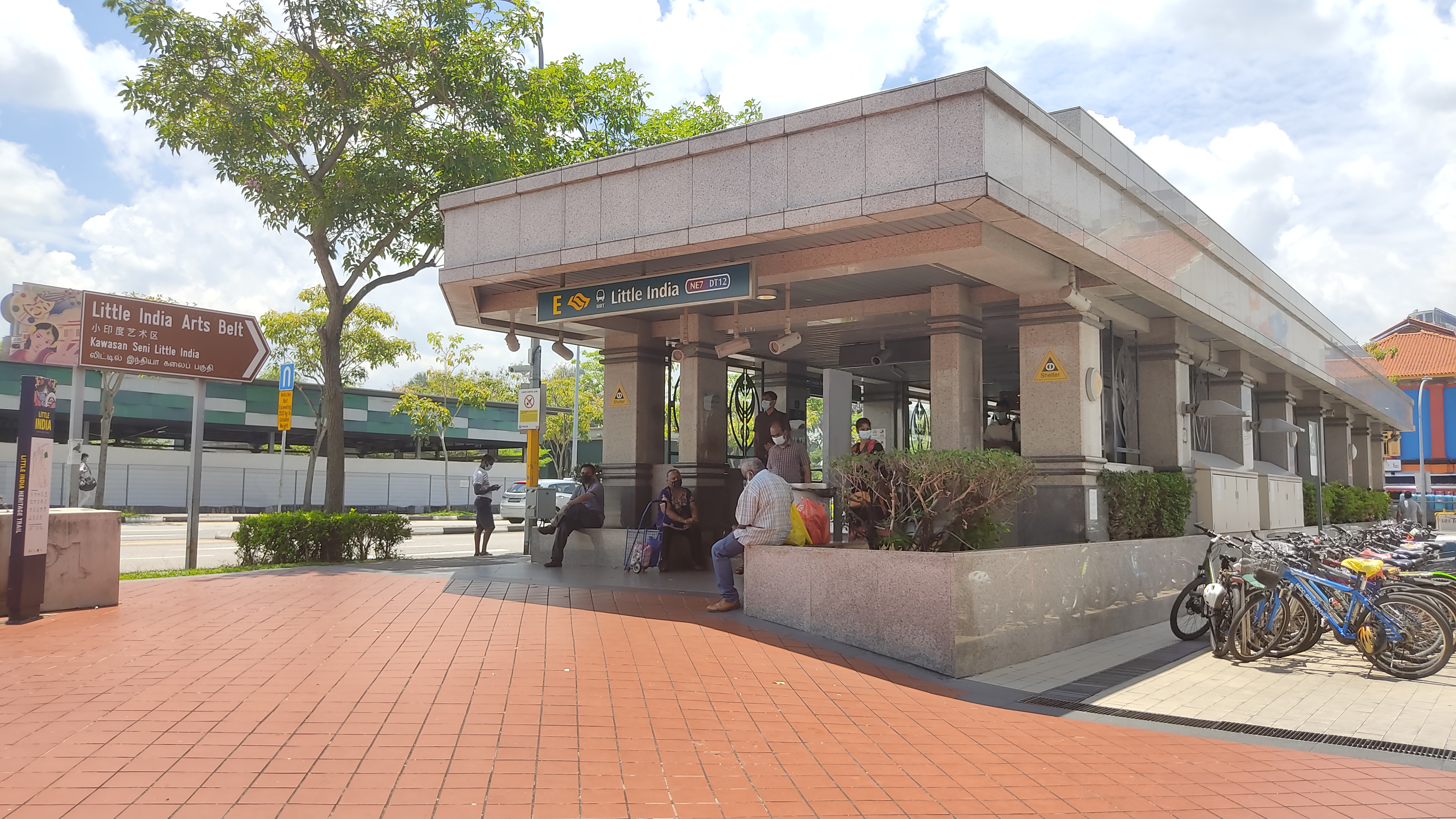
Entrance to Little India station, with leaf-shaped patterns on metal grills

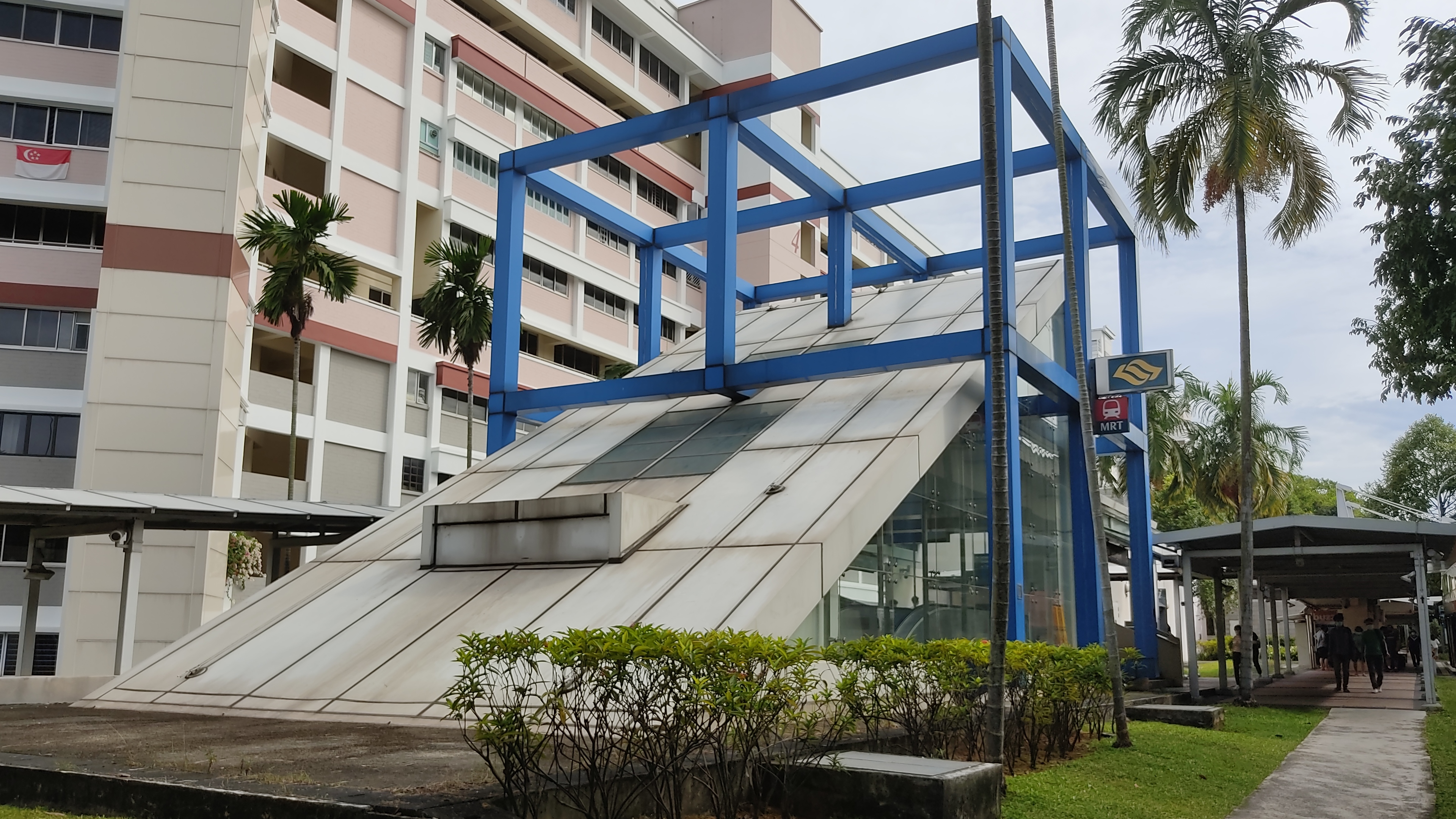
Each of the triangular entrances at the Serangoon station is enclosed by a cubic structure.

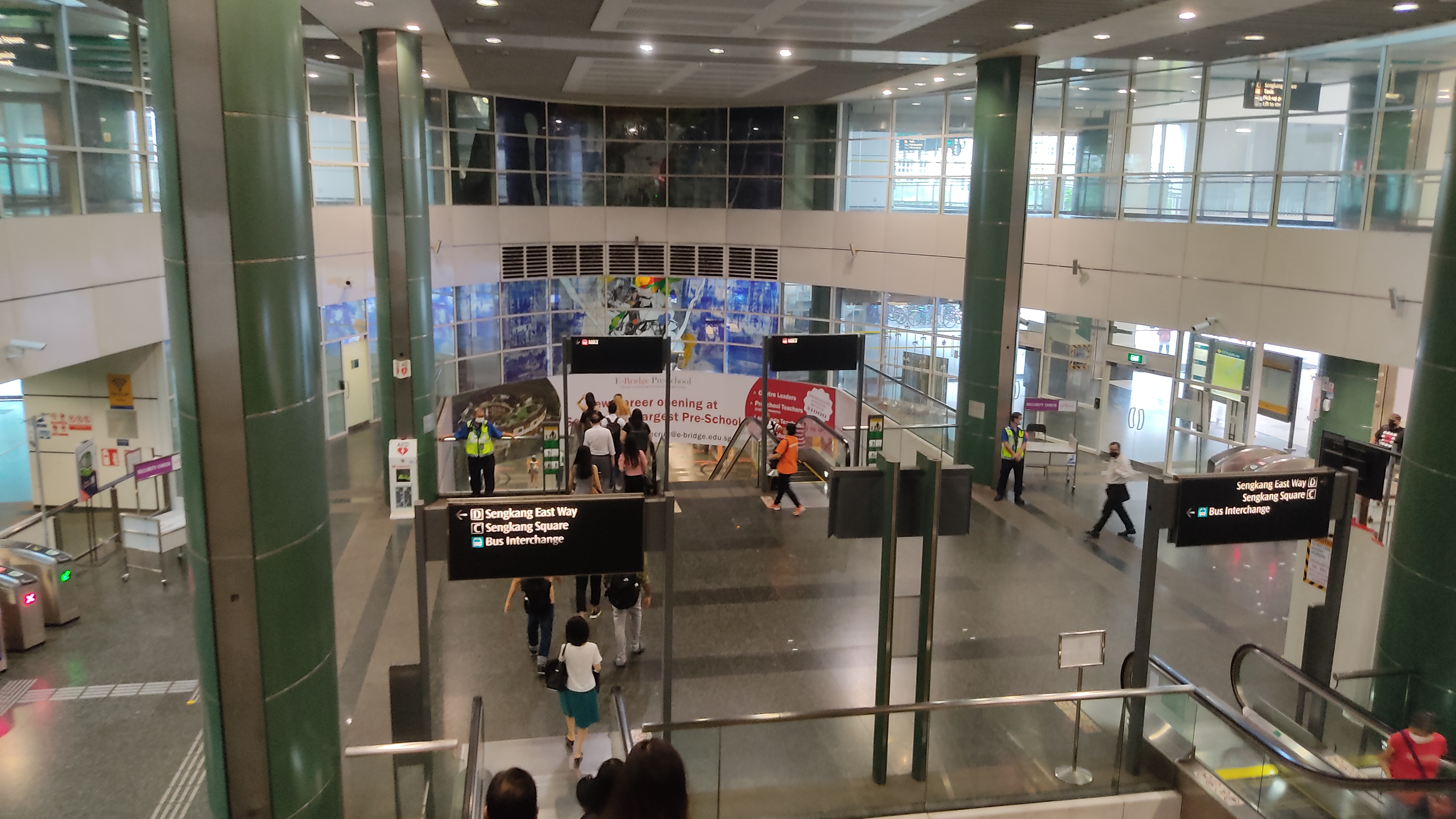
Sengkang station concourse

Each of the 16 NEL stations has a unique design which reflects its location. The HarbourFront station has a maritime theme, with an elliptical ship's-hull motif used for the ceiling and concourse entrances to the platforms. At Little India, the station walls' metal grills have leaf-shaped patterns similar to the door patterns of Hindu prayer rooms. The station's design was intended to reflect Indian traditions.

Station entrances use glass, allowing natural lighting during the day. Exit A of the Chinatown station has a transparent pavilion-style roof, which allows natural light and provides an unobstructed view of the shophouses along Pagoda Street. At Serangoon, each of its four triangular-shaped entrances is painted a different colour and enclosed in a cubic structure. Unlike at the other NEL stations, the entrances to Buangkok do not use glass; white Teflon sheets are supported by metal frames.

Dhoby Ghaut station is the MRT network's largest, and the five-level station is integrated with the twin-towered office complex Atrium@Orchard above it. The network's first such integration of an MRT station with a commercial development, it permits more efficient land use and improves access to public transport. The station's NEL platforms, 28 metres (92 ft) underground, are some of the MRT's deepest.

The four-level Sengkang station is an integrated hub, with Singapore's three public-transport modes – MRT, LRT and bus – serving the Sengkang area. The MRT/LRT station was the MRT network's first intermodal station for all three transport modes. In addition to its transport facilities, the station is integrated with the Compass Heights and Compass Point developments.

Designed by the 3HPArchitects and Farrells architectural firms, the Punggol station is integrated with the LRT station and the bus interchange. Its curved aluminium and stainless-steel cladding gives the station a futuristic look befitting the Punggol 21 developments. Covering 320 metres (350 yards) along Punggol Central to accommodate bus stops, taxi stands and passenger drop-off points along the road, the station is the NEL's longest.

== Circle Line ==
A variety of architecture on the CCL stations

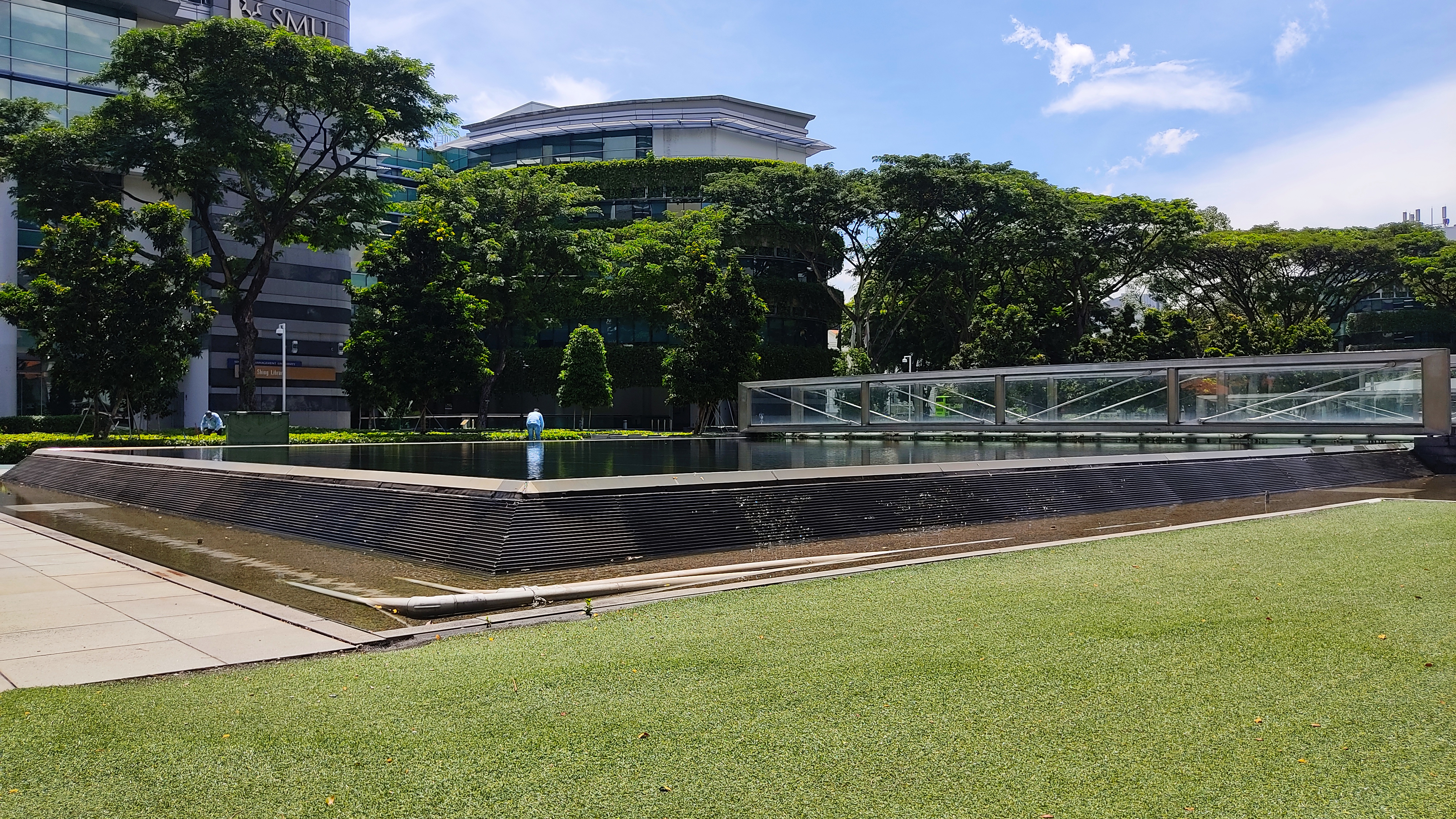
The reflecting pool above Bras Basah station

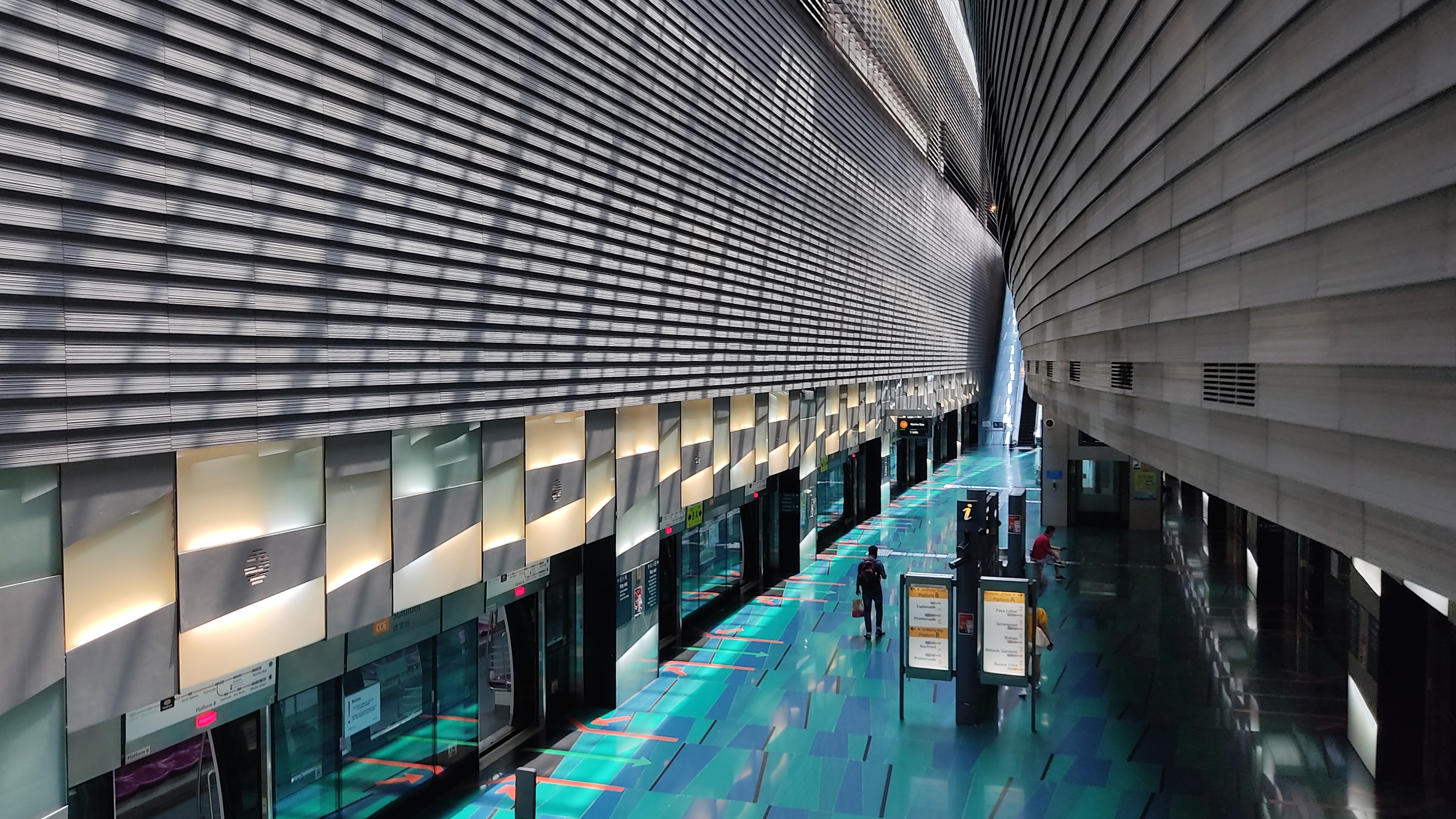
The interior of Stadium station

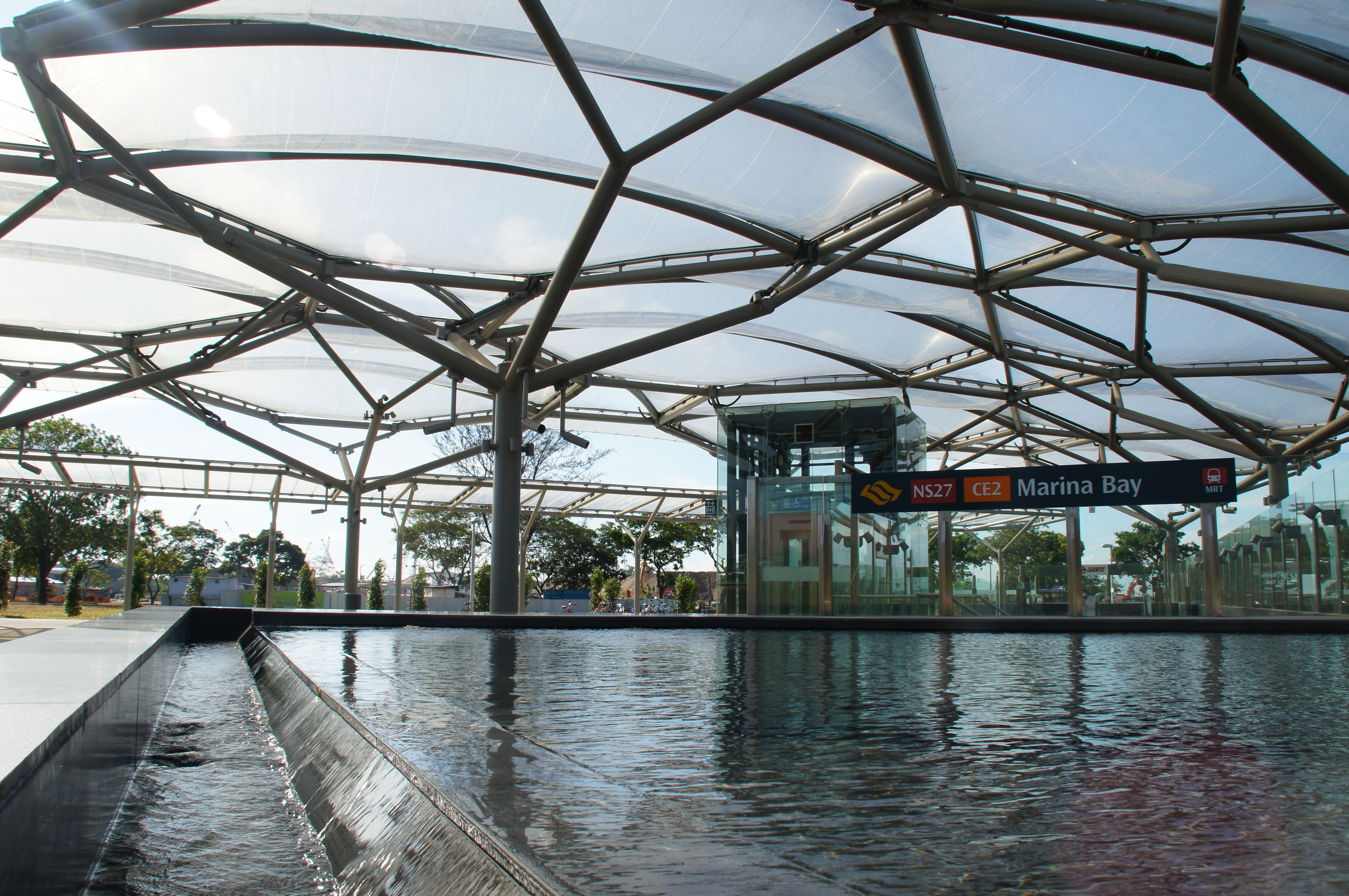
The transculent canopy above the reflective pool at the Marina Bay station entrance

=== Bras Basah station (2010) ===
Bras Basah station is one of two stations commissioned through the Marina line Architectural Design Competition jointly organised by the Land Transport Authority (LTA) and the Singapore Institute of Architects (SIA). Designed by WOHA, the station design resolves two conflicting conditions needed for the station: allowing a visual connection to the exterior to enhance the travel experience for the commuters, and enabling the station to blend into the landscape in the historic district and park location. A reflection pool, which also acts as the station roof, allows skylight to enter the station, and functions as a landscape element on the surface. With skylight entering the station, minimal artificial light is required for the station during the day. The natural light improves way-finding and safety for the commuters. The ventilation shafts of the station blends into the landscape, avoiding obstruction of the view across the site to the surrounding civic buildings.

At the 2001 SIA Awards, the SIA awarded LTA the prize for ‘Excellence in Architectural Design Competitions’. In 2009, the station was awarded the "Best Transport Building" at the World Architecture Festival, on the basis that the design gives "precedence to the surrounding, historically important, colonial structures, creating a piazza-like urban space to the station underneath" and noted the design's functionality to allow natural light into the station. The station later won the Award for International Architecture at the AIA's (American Institute of Architects) 2010 National Architecture Awards. In addition, it won the Chicago Athenaeum and the European Centre for Architecture Art Design and Urban Studies and International Architecture Awards in 2011.

=== Stadium station (2010) ===
Stadium station was designed by an architectural team from WOHA, an architectural firm, led by Wang Mun Summ and Richard Hassell. The station was another station to be commissioned through the Marina Line Architectural Design Competition jointly organized by the Land Transport Authority (LTA) and the Singapore Institute of Architects (SIA) in 2000. The station was designed to handle large passenger numbers during major events, featuring an open-air concourse and plaza space to accommodate the crowds and prevent overcrowding within the station. The open-ended station allows it to be linked to future developments around the station at ground level.

Initially, it was proposed by the design team to elevate the then-existing Stadium Boulevard and build a public space underneath which will link to the surrounding buildings. However, after analysing possible traffic patterns for the road bridge, the (LTA) recommended scrapping the bridge. As the bridge was a key feature of the design, the team had to redesign the station, but they kept the characteristics of a public plaza, a transparent diagram and basic yet massive elements for the new design.

The new design contrasts a straight side against a curved opposite side. According to WOHA, the change is just rotating the old design on its side, with the bridge changed to the curved side and the ground being the straight vertical side. The curve side and the grey colour scheme draws reference to the old National Stadium, which has been demolished to make way for the current Singapore Sports Hub. The station has a grand spacious interior inspired by European train stations built in the 19th century, with the skylight naturally illuminating the platforms to make them visually appealing and eliminating the need to have excessive signage to navigate around. The station exterior was clad with ribbed aluminium to make the material ambiguous; making them look soft or hard depending on light conditions and time of the day.

This station was awarded "Design Of The Year" of the President's Design Award in 2010, nominated by Patrick Bingham-Hall, an architectural photographer. Bingham-Hall, the nominator, praised the station as a 'brilliantly intuitive piece of architecture (which) defy imitation', while the jurors of the award commented that the station design was 'appropriate' to reflect the importance of the new Sports Hub the station serves. The station also received the 9th SIA Architectural Design Awards for the Industrial, Transport & Infrastructure, the Award for International Architecture by the Australian Institute of Architects and the 2010 International Architecture Award by the Chicago Athenaeum and the European Centre for Architecture Art Design and Urban Studies. It was also one of the finalists for the 2008 World Architecture Festival.

=== Marina Bay station (2012) ===
The Circle Line station was designed by Aedas, Quarry Bay & Aedas Pte Ltd (Station Architect). Visibility, integration and efficiency were the focal points when designing the CCL part of the station, as the station entrances need to integrate into the park where the station is located. The design also has provisions for a future underground pedestrian network (converted from a temporary maintenance facility near the station) and connections to future developments. The translucent canopy acts as a skylight to allow natural light into the underground hall. The large entrance also allows large amounts of natural light to enter the station. To limit the visual impact of the station to the surrounding park landscape, only the lift, escalators, the lightweight ETFE canopy and the reflective pool are visible from street level, giving users a full view of the park from the station entrance. The reflective pool also provides a smooth transition between the exits and the park.

The station design was the winner of the Small Project Award at the World Architecture Festival in 2012. Other awards includes the Land Transport Excellence Awards 2012 (as the Best Design Rail / Road Infrastructure – Project Partner), the 2013 UIPT Asia-Pacific Grow with Public Transport Award and honourable mention for the Singapore Institute of Architects Architectural Design Awards 2012.

== Downtown Line ==
=== Little India station (2015) ===
The DTL station was designed by Architects61, which adopted a flowing fabric theme reminiscent of the Indian sari to reflect the vicinity's heritage.

=== Fort Canning station (2017) ===
To reflect its location near the Fort Canning Park, the station has a natural green theme with an arched ceiling over the station's interior. As a tribute to the former National Theatre that once stood near the station site, abstract patterns of the theatre are featured on the concourse stone walls and railings.

=== Bencoolen station (2017) ===
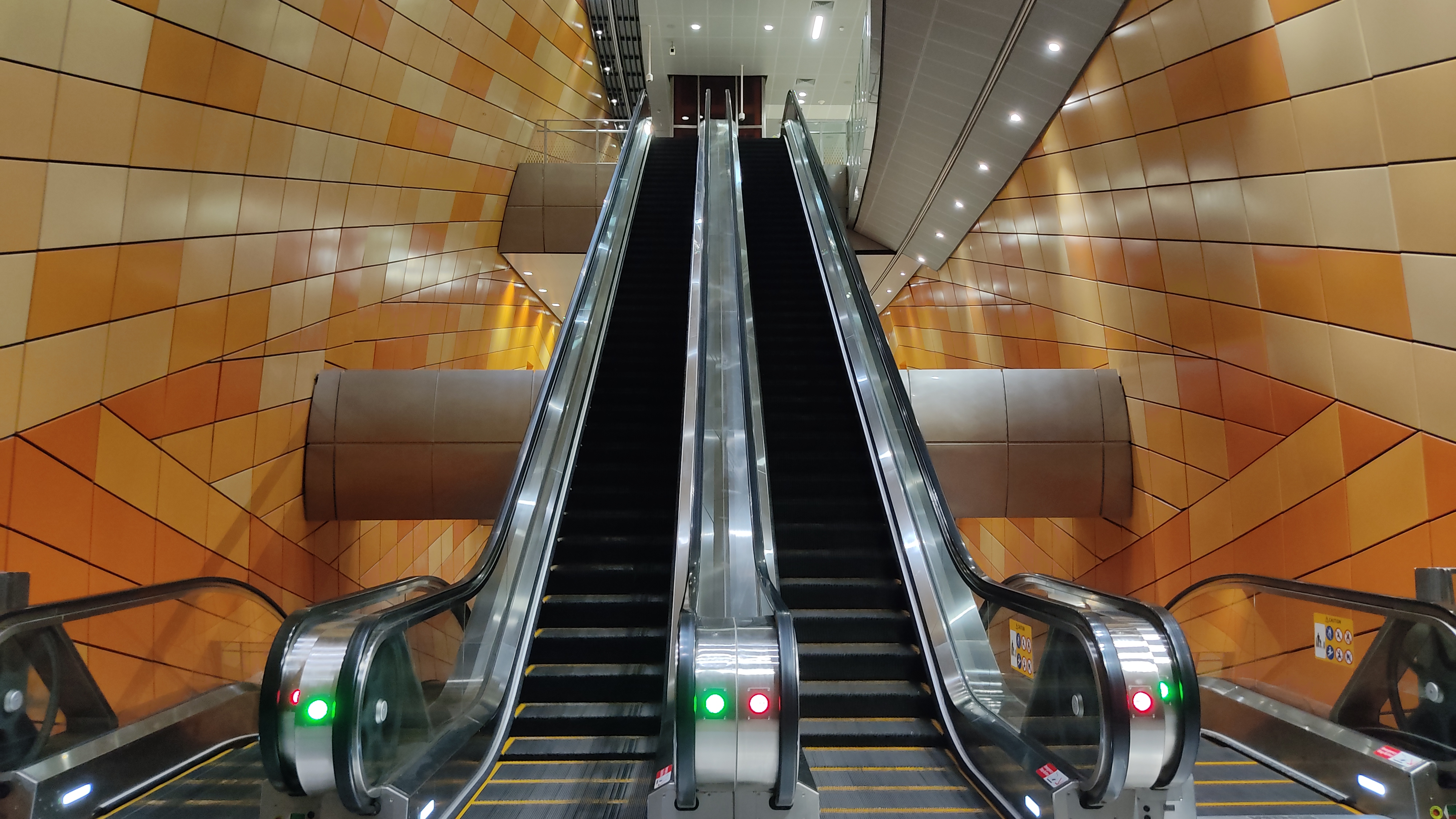
The interior of the station with curved walls in earth-tone colours

The six-level underground station reaches 43 metres (141 ft) below ground and is the deepest station on the MRT network. The station and the tunnels are placed at that depth to avoid the existing infrastructure at the surface, as well as the other rail tunnels in the way of the alignment. The station, designed by Aedas, is only 22 metres (72 ft) wide and 140 metres (460 ft) long, as the distance between the buildings along the street is 25 metres (82 ft) wide.

The station has three entrances. Exit A of the station is within the NAFA Tower Block above the station and the underpass link to the SMU. The station was constructed in tandem with NAFA's fourth campus. The integration allows students to access the campus easily regardless of the weather conditions. The glass and frame structure of Exit B is designed in vintage style to "harmonise" with the colonial-style exterior of Hotel Rendezvous near the station.

The curving interior walls are meant to resemble canyon walls, while earth-tone colours were used to represent the many layers of the soil, emphasising the depth of space. The glass walls of the passenger lifts are tinted in maroon, making the descent to the platforms appear as a descent to the Earth's core, thereby enhancing the commuters' experience in the station.

At the surface, Bencoolen Street was transformed into an enhanced pedestrian walkway. Two of the four lanes had been permanently closed to make way for a community space, which includes a wide footpath for pedestrians and a dedicated bicycle lane. The transformation was part of Singapore's government Walk-Cycle-Ride initiative, which was aimed to make the country "car-lite" and allow more opportunities to walk and cycle. One of the remaining lanes on the street was converted into a dedicated bus lane to facilitate efficient bus services.

The area is designed to be pedestrian-friendly, with sheltered linkways from the station to the surrounding developments. The surface structures of the station, comprising the entrances and vent shafts, were placed to preserve the buildings' facades while establishing a "vibrant, comfortable" walking environment above ground. The street also features seven "funky" benches designed by students and alumni through a competition held by NAFA. The bench designs include a dog-shaped double-level bench, another shaped like a cat on its back, and animal-shaped branches made of fibreglass. These benches were intended to add some innovation to the streetscape. A total of 125 bicycle parking lots are installed at various places along the street.

== Artworks ==
=== Art in Transit ===
Art in Transit

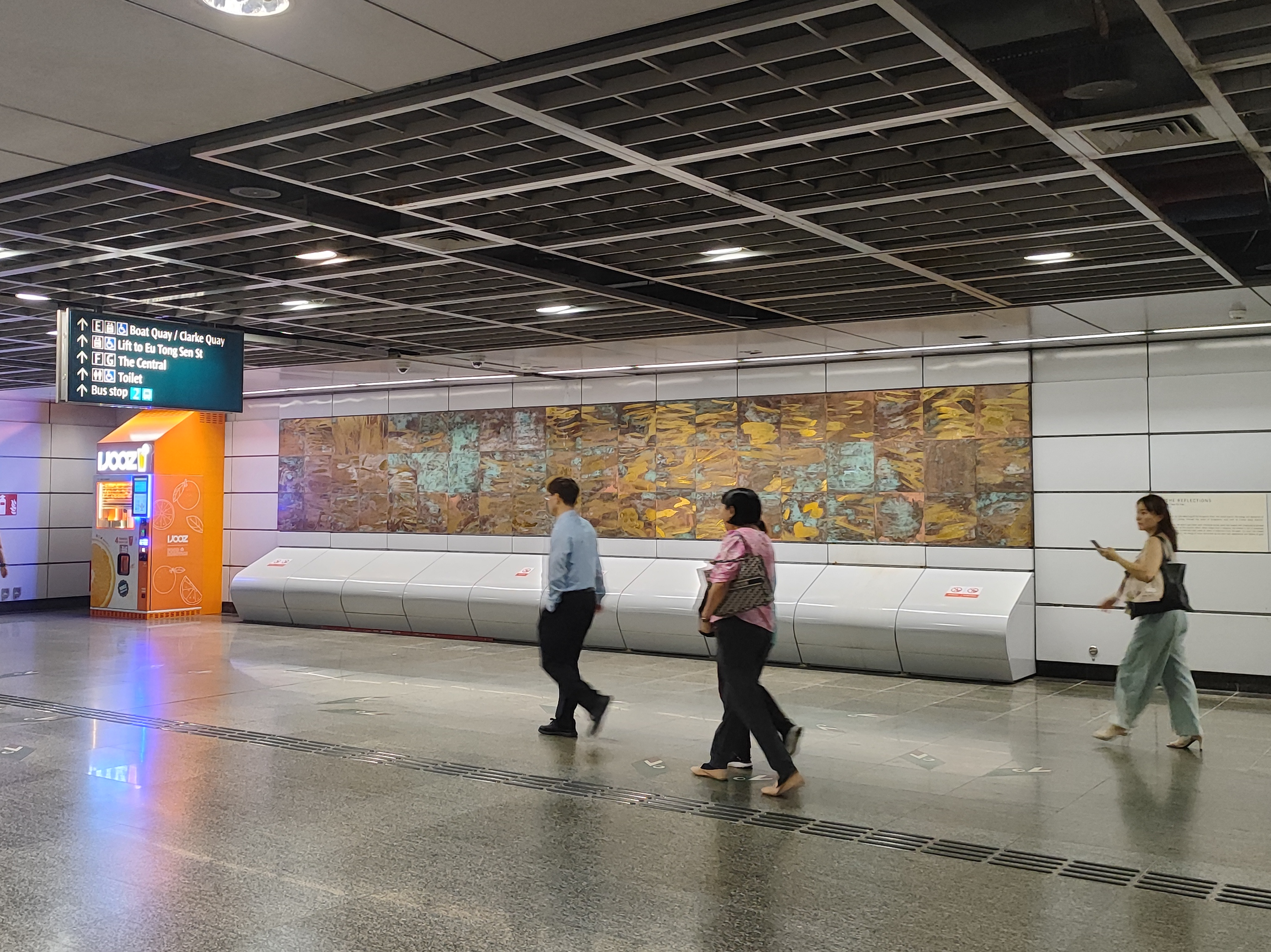
The Reflections by Chua Ek Kay at the North East Line's Clarke Quay station

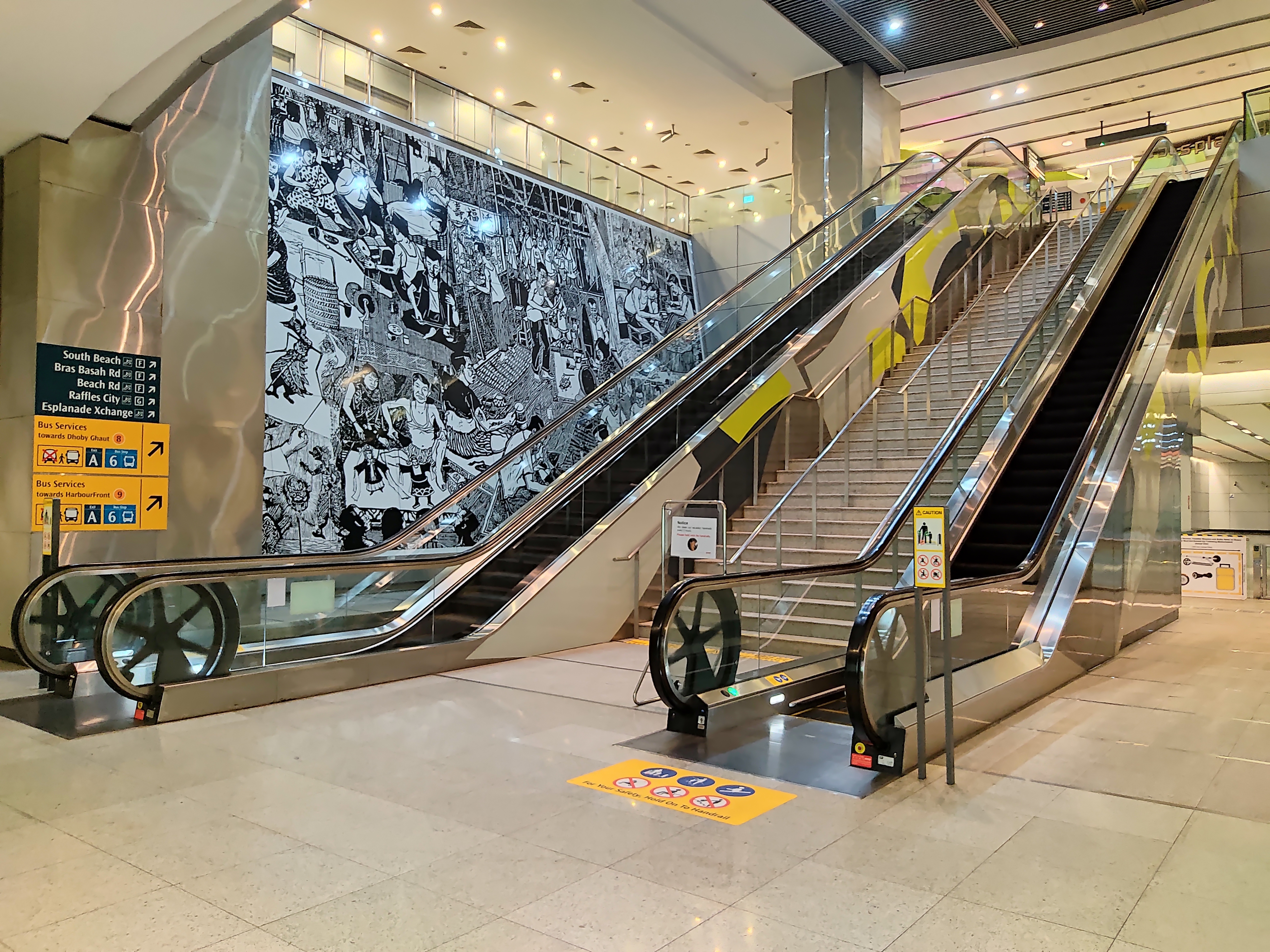
A Piece of Ice-Clear Heart by Lim Mu Hue at the Circle Line's Esplanade station

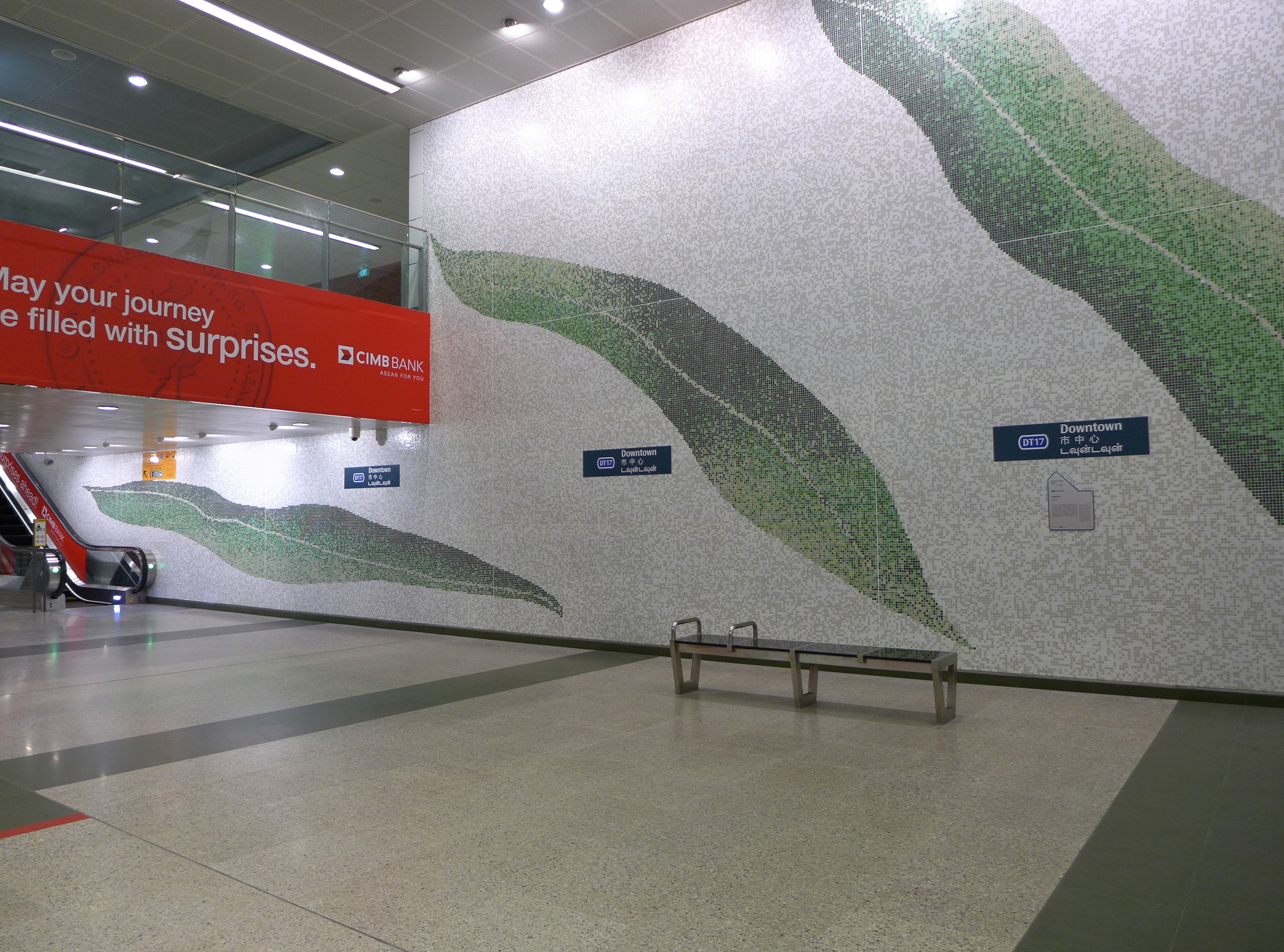
Leaves by Jason Lim at the Downtown Line's Downtown station

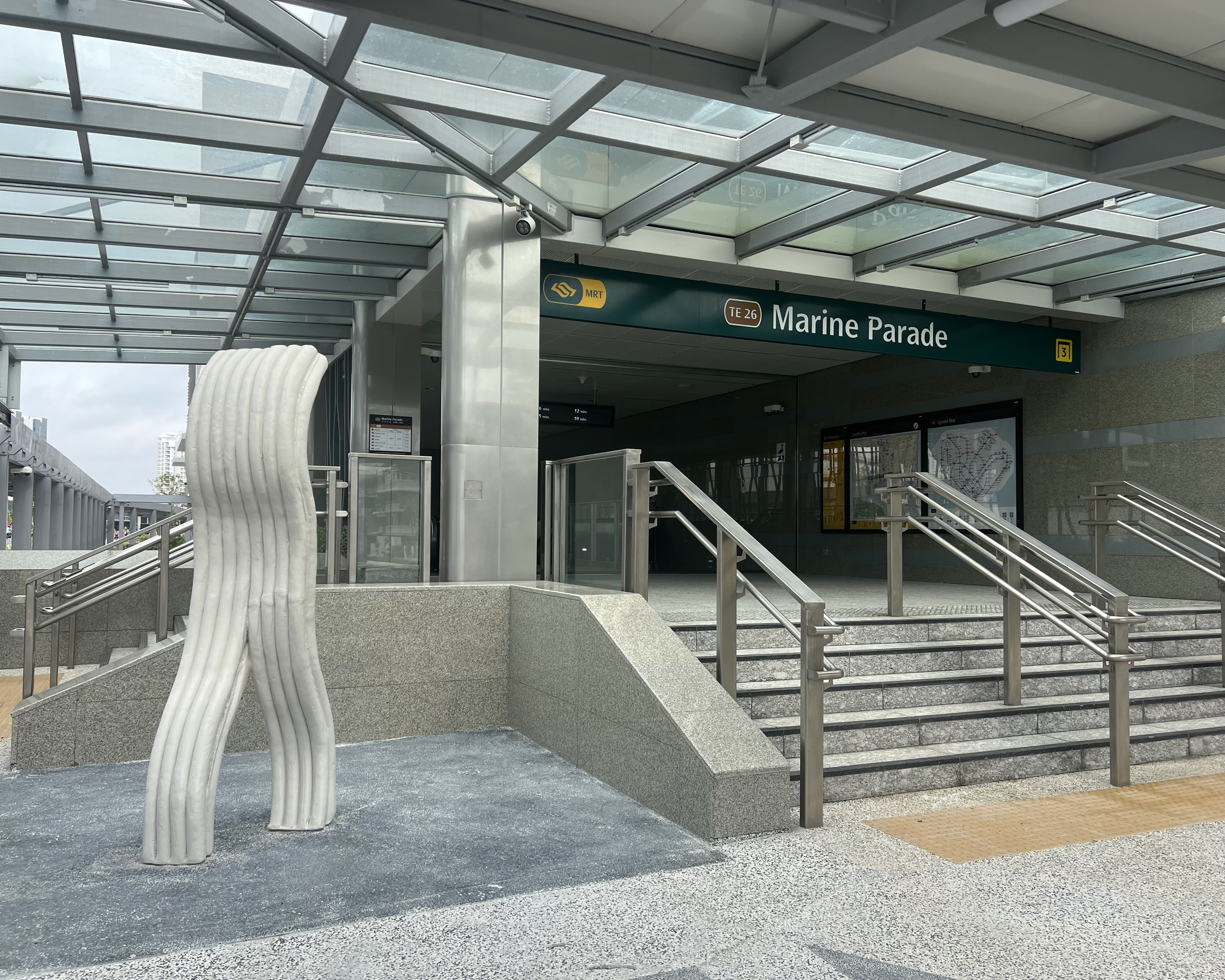
WALK by Ang Sookoon at the Thomson–East Coast Line's Marine Parade station

The Art in Transit (AiT) programme is a commissioned public arts program directed by the Land Transport Authority (LTA) for the Singapore MRT network. The artworks commissioned were integrated as part of the stations' designs. Considered a "significant milestone" for public art in Singapore, the artwork project aims to enhance the commuters' experience when travelling. Unlike previous artworks featured in the original NSEWL stations, the artwork has to be integrated into the station, while reflecting the history and heritage of the station's locality.

The AiT programme was launched in 1997 with the development of the North East Line (NEL), which features 18 artworks in the 16 NEL stations by 19 artists. These artists were selected through the Art Review Panel, which reviews the artists' portfolios and manages the development of the art concepts. With the AiT programme warmly received by the public, the Land Transport Authority (LTA) continued the programme through the Circle Line (CCL). The programme was further expanded to include more art genres, with the public invited for artwork proposals for selected stations. An international competition was launched for two artistic seat designs for the CCL interchange stations. The programme continued for the subsequent rail lines of the DTL and the TEL.

==== Artwork list ====
Station code	Station name	Artwork name	Artist(s)
NSL
NS12	Canberra	Symbiosis	MessyMsxi
NS28	Marina South Pier	SG50 Singapore Tapestry	Delia Prvacki
NEL
NE1	HarbourFront	Engimatic Appearances	Ian Woo
NE3	Outram Park	Memories	Wang Lu Sheng
NE3	Outram Park	Commuters	Teo Eng Seng
NE4	Chinatown	The Phoenix's-Eye Domain	Tan Swie Hian
NE5	Clarke Quay	The Reflections	Chua Ek Kay
NE6	Dhoby Ghaut	Interchange	Milenko and Delia Prvacki
NE6	Dhoby Ghaut	Universal Language	Sun Yu-Li
NE7	Little India	Memoirs of the Past	S. Chandrasekaran
NE8	Farrer Park	Rhythmic Exuberance	Poh Siew Wah
NE9	Boon Keng	Metamorphosis	Lim Poh Teck
NE10	Potong Pasir	Point of View	Matthew Ngui
NE11	Woodleigh	Slow Motion	April Ng
NE12	Serangoon	Memories of Childhood	Eng Joo Heng
NE13	Kovan	The Trade-off	Eng Tow
NE14	Hougang	Hands Up for Hougang	Seck Yok Ying
NE15	Buangkok	Water, Nature & Contemporary	Vincent Leow
NE16	Sengkang	T.R.A.N.S.I.T.I.O.N.S.	Koh Bee Liang
NE17	Punggol	Water, Landscape & Future	Goh Beng Kwan
NE18	Punggol Coast	Trajectories	Zul Othman
CCL
CC1	Dhoby Ghaut	Man and Environment	Baet Yeok Kuan
CC2	Bras Basah	The Amazing Neverending Underwater Adventures!	Tan Kai Syng
CC3	Esplanade	A Piece of Ice-Clear Heart	Lim Mu Hue
CC4	Promenade	Dreams in Social Cosmic Odyssey	PHUNK
CC5	Nicoll Highway	Re-Claiming The Peripherals	Khiew Huey Chian
CC6	Stadium	The Perfect Moment	Roy Zhang
CC7	Mountbatten	Lord Mountbatten Thinks of Pink	Jason Wee
CC8	Dakota	Little Things, Little Stories	A Dose of Light
CC9	Paya Lebar	The Signs of Times	Salleh Japar
CC10	MacPherson	Virtuous Cycle	Kay Kok Chung Oi
CC11	Tai Seng	Equilibrium	Francis Ng
CC12	Bartley	The Coin Mat	Jane Lee
CC13	Serangoon	View of Life	Sarkasi Said
CC14	Lorong Chuan	Through the Looking Glass	A Dose of Light & Yoma Studio
CC15	Bishan	Move!	Soh Ee Shaun
CC16	Marymount	Superstring	Joshua Yang
CC17	Caldecott	The Cartography of Memories	Hazel Lim
CC19	Botanic Gardens	Aquatic Fauna No. 1	Lam Hoi Lit & Chua Chye Teck
CC20	Farrer Road	Art Lineage	Erzan Bin Adam
CC21	Holland Village	Holland Beat	Jeremy Sharma
CC22	Buona Vista	The Tree of Life	Gilles Massot
CC23	one-north	A Visual Narrative of Pandemonic Rhythmic Movement	Yek Wong
CC24	Kent Ridge	Poetry Mix-Up	Mixed Reality Lab
CC25	Haw Par Villa	Eroclamation	Tan Wee Lit
CC26	Pasir Panjang	Lieutenant Adnan	Ho Tzu Nyen
CC27	Labrador Park	Without Which / Would Have Been / Impossible	Heman Chong
CC28	Telok Blangah	Notes Towards a Museum of Cooking Pot Bay	Michael Lee
CC29	HarbourFront	Commuting Waves	Jason Ong
CC30	Keppel	Uncontainable Dreams	Kenneth Kao Qibao
CC31	Cantonment	A Journey Between	Han Sai Por
CC32	Prince Edward Road	Doppler	Gerald Leow
CC33	Marina Bay	Train Rides on Rainy Days	Nah Yong En
CC33	Marina Bay	Flowers in Blossom II	Tay Chee Toh
CC34	Bayfront	When the Ship Comes In	Lee Wen
DTL
DT1	Bukit Panjang	Punctum of the Long Hills	John Clang
DT2	Cashew	Project Eden	Donna Ong
DT3	Hillview	What Remains	Darren Soh
DT4	Hume	Continuity	André Wee
DT5	Beauty World	Asemic Lines	Boedi Widjaja
DT6	King Albert Park	The Natural History of Singapore's Mythical Botanic Creatures	Soh Pei Ling, Chan Mei Hsien & Long Yinghan (Artists Caravan)
DT8	Tan Kah Kee	Gratitude (饮水思源) and Resilience (自强不息)	Students of Hwa Chong Institution
DT9	Botanic Gardens	What is a tree?	Shirley Soh
DT10	Stevens	PIN – 23040	Om Mee Ai
DT11	Newton	Newton	Tan Zi Xi
DT12	Little India	Woven Field	Grace Tan
DT13	Rochor	Tracing Memories	LASALLE College of the Arts
DT14	Bugis	Ephemeral	Patrick Chia
DT15	Promenade	Earthcake	Ana Prvacki
DT17	Downtown	Leaves	Jason Lim
DT18	Telok Ayer	Charm of Bay	Lim Shing Ee
DT19	Chinatown	Flying Colours	Cheo Chai-Hiang
DT20	Fort Canning	Through His Eyes	Lim Tze Peng
DT21	Bencoolen	Tracing Memories	Nanyang Academy of Fine Arts
DT22	Jalan Besar	A Kaleidoscopic World	Lydia Wong
DT23	Bendemeer	And A New World	Cristene Chang
DT24	Geylang Bahru	Constructed Memories	Marienne Yang
DT25	Mattar	Agar Panel	Genevieve Chua
DT26	MacPherson	Trails of Thoughts	Aminah Mohd Sa'at (Neng)
DT27	Ubi	Staple	Zainudin Samsuri
DT28	Kaki Bukit	Welcome to Kaki Bukit	Hans Tan
DT29	Bedok North	Dedaun Masa (Leaves of Time)	Ahmad Abu Bakar
DT30	Bedok Reservoir	Somewhere Else	Ng Chee Yong
DT31; DT33	Tampines West Tampines East	Welcome to Jingapore!	Jing Quek
DT32	Tampines	The Big Round & The Tall Long	Studio Juju
DT34	Upper Changi	I Am Anonymous	Boo Junfeng
DT35	Expo	A Banquet	Yeo Chee Kiong
TEL
TE1	Woodlands North	New Departures	Amanda Heng
TE2	Woodlands	The Day’s Thoughts of a Homespun Journey into Night	Terence Lin
TE3	Woodlands South	3652 x 50	Kng Mian Tze
TE4	Springleaf	Tree of Memories	Koh Hong Teng
TE5	Lentor	Interlude for Lentor	Tan Guo-Liang
TE6	Mayflower	Bird Sculptures	Song-Ming Ang
TE7	Bright Hill	A Kaleidoscopic Nature	anGie seah
TE8	Upper Thomson	Lost In Our (Concrete) Jungle	Troy Chin
TE9	Caldecott	: ) ( :	Claire Lim
TE11	Stevens	A Syllabus For Stevens	Shubigi Rao
TE12	Napier	Botanical Art	National Parks Board
TE13	Orchard Boulevard	PULSE	Twardzik Ching Chor Leng
TE14	Orchard	Scotts Road / Orchard Road from ION Sky	Mintio
TE15	Great World	Great World, Great Times	Deanna Ng
TE16	Havelock	Havelock Traces	Anonymous
TE17	Outram Park	mata-mata	Hafiz Osman
TE18	Maxwell	Old Chinatown In New Maxwell Life	Justin Lee
TE19	Shenton Way	Everyday Singapore 每日所见	Quek Kiat Sing
TE20	Marina Bay	Walking Into The Interstitial	Tang Ling Nah
TE22	Gardens by the Bay	Planting Shadows	Vertical Submarine
TE23	Tanjong Rhu	telinga ekologi kita	bani haykal
TE24	Katong Park	Time After Time	Sit Weng San & Tania De Rozario
TE25	Tanjong Katong	“The waters are blue / Yet I pine for you”	Sim Chi Yin
TE26	Marine Parade	WALK	Ang Sookoon
TE27	Marine Terrace	A seat at the end of the long, long, long table	Moses Tan
TE28	Siglap	The Darkness which Reveals	Melissa Tan
TE29	Bayshore	Farther Shores	Bruce Quek

=== Comic Connect ===
The Comic Connect programme is a public arts program directed by SMRT Corporation, one of the two operators of the MRT. The art programme, which celebrates SMRT's 35th anniversary, involves the corporation collaborating with local artists to create heritage-themed, comic-styled murals for 35 SMRT-operated stations; these murals are inspired by the history and culture of the neighbourhood the stations serve. The Comic Connect programme was launched in June 2022 with the unveiling of a mural at Toa Payoh station, and the rest of the murals were unveiled in the next two years, with the last one unveiled at Choa Chu Kang station in November 2024.

== Other features ==
=== Wayfinding ===
The initial MRT system used colours which indicated the direction of trains. Hence, the North–South Line had red for southbound trains and yellow for northbound trains, and the East–West Line had green for eastbound and blue for westbound. The North East Line would have used light purple for Punggol-bound trains and red for Harbourfront-bound trains. The station numbering code for the NSEWL was initially based on their distance from the two "central" stations of City Hall (C2) and Raffles Place (C1).

In 2001, the LTA introduced a new signage system that assigns a single color to each MRT and LRT line instead. Alongside this, a new alphanumeric station code system was implemented, consisting of two letters representing the line and a number identifying the station. The numbering generally follows a sequential order from east to west and north to south. Additionally, each terminus of an MRT line is assigned a destination number to help commuters determine the direction of travel. This signage system was designed by Lloyd Northover.
