= Sima (architecture) =

Upturned edge of an ancient roof

Schematic draw of sima (3)

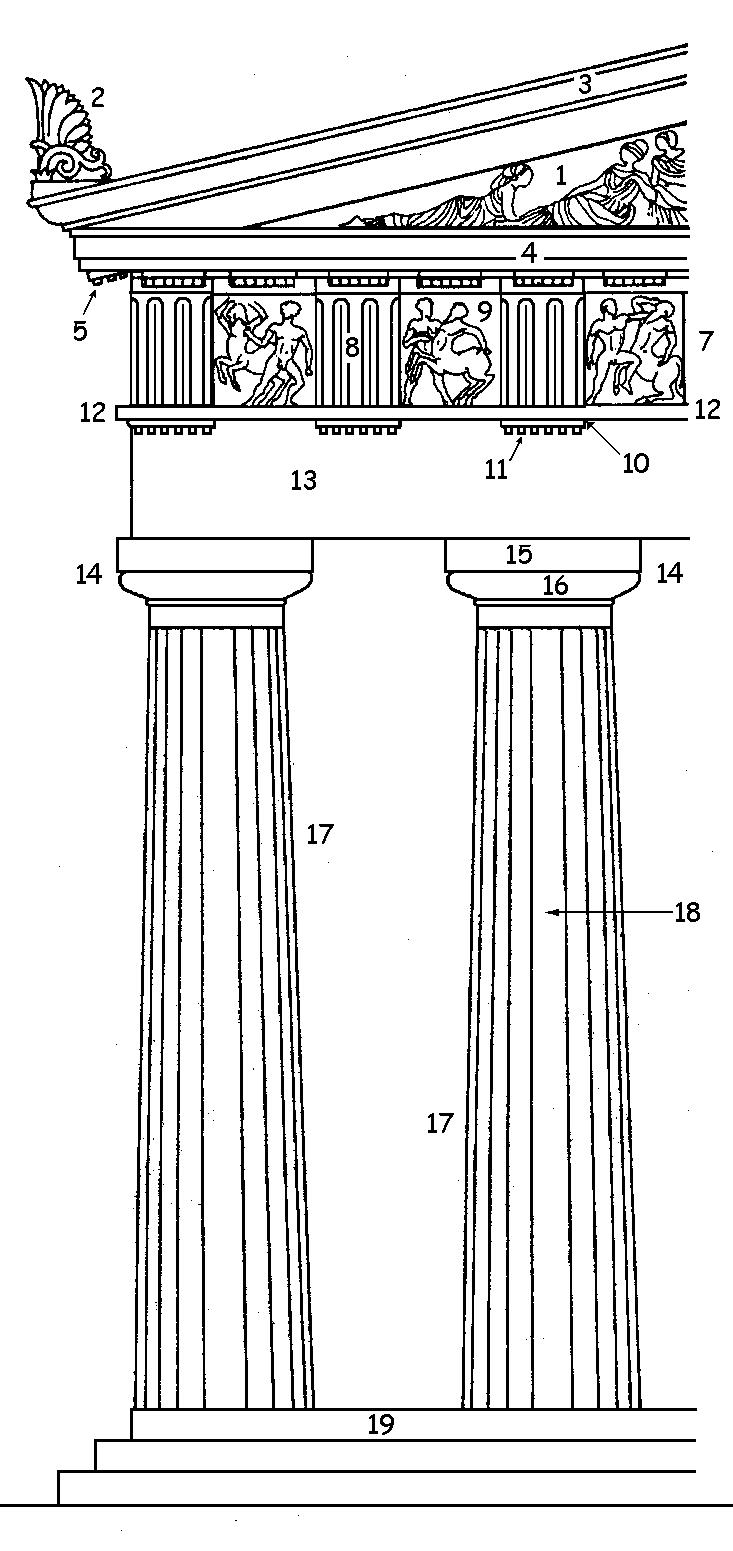
Classical Greek Architecture: Sima (3)

In classical architecture, a sima is the upturned edge of a roof which acts as a gutter. The term "sima" comes from the Greek simos, meaning bent upwards.

== Form ==
The sima runs around all four sides of a building. It may be made of terracotta or stone. There are two basic types of sima:

- The raking sima
- The lateral sima

The raking sima is continuous and generally follows the slope of the roof. The lateral sima runs along the horizontal edges and is broken by downspouts to let out rainwater.

== Decoration ==
Simas are normally decorated. Stone simas have continuous narratives, especially on the raking sides where they are not interrupted by spouts, similar to a frieze. Terracotta simas have repeating patterns that are easy to reproduce with molds. In particular, raking simas were often decorated with floral motifs or other patterns.

Early simas feature tubular or half-cylindrical spouts, but by the middle of the 6th century BC these were mostly replaced with spouts in the shape of animal heads. Lion's heads were common, but ram and dog heads also existed. These animal heads may have served as religious symbolism, or as puns on the structure's geographic location.

== See also ==
- Traditional Chinese roofing
- Architectural ironmongery
