= Gardens by the Bay MRT station =

Mass Rapid Transit station in Singapore

Gardens by the Bay TE22 滨海湾花园 கரையோரப் பூந்தோட்டங்கள் Taman di Persisiran
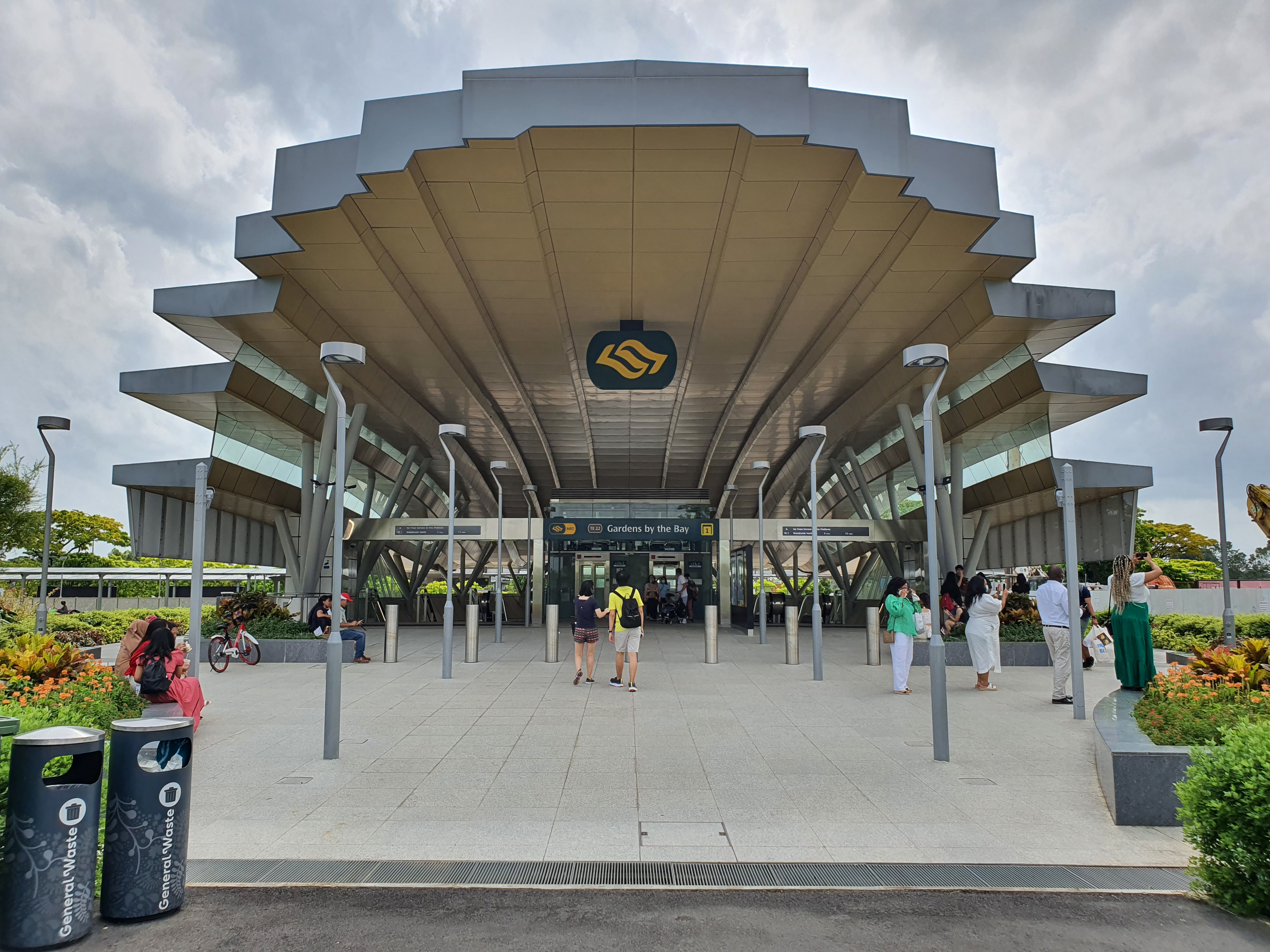
- Exit 1 of the station

General information
- Location: 11 Marina Mall, Singapore 019396
- Coordinates: 01°16′42″N 103°52′05″E
- System: Mass Rapid Transit (MRT) station
- Owner: Land Transport Authority
- Operator: SMRT Trains
- Line: Thomson–East Coast Line
- Platforms: 2 (1 island platform)
- Tracks: 2
- Connections: Bus, Taxi

Construction
- Structure type: Underground
- Platform levels: 1
- Cycle facilities: Yes
- Accessible: Yes

Other information
- Station code: GRB

History
- Opened: 13 November 2022; 4 years ago
- Former names: Marina Barrage, Marina Gardens

Passengers
- June 2024: 3,692 per day

Services
Preceding station	Mass Rapid Transit	Following station
Marina Bay towards Woodlands North	Thomson–East Coast Line	Tanjong Rhu towards Bayshore
Marina South towards Woodlands North	Thomson–East Coast Line Future service	Founders' Memorial towards Sungei Bedok
Track layout
Location
- Location within Singapore Rail central area

Gardens by the Bay MRT station is an underground Mass Rapid Transit (MRT) station on the Thomson–East Coast Line (TEL). Located in Marina South, Singapore, the station serves Gardens by the Bay and Marina Barrage.

First announced in August 2012 as part of the Thomson Line (TSL), the station was constructed as part of TEL Phase 3 (TEL 3) with the merger of the TSL and the Eastern Region Line. The station opened on 13 November 2022. Gardens by the Bay station features an Art-in-Transit Planting Shadows by Vertical Submarine.

== History ==
Construction progress

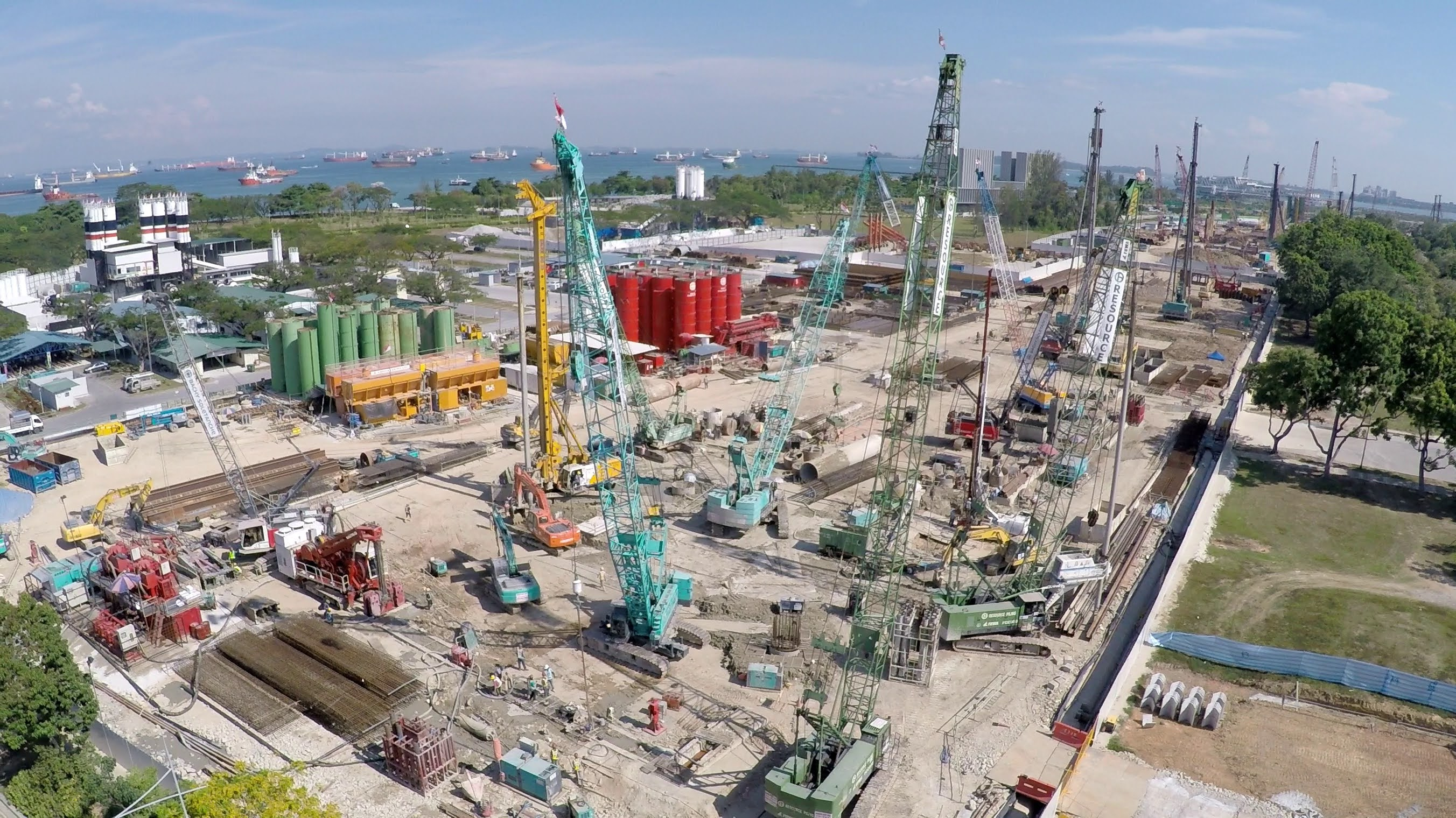
Station site in July 2015

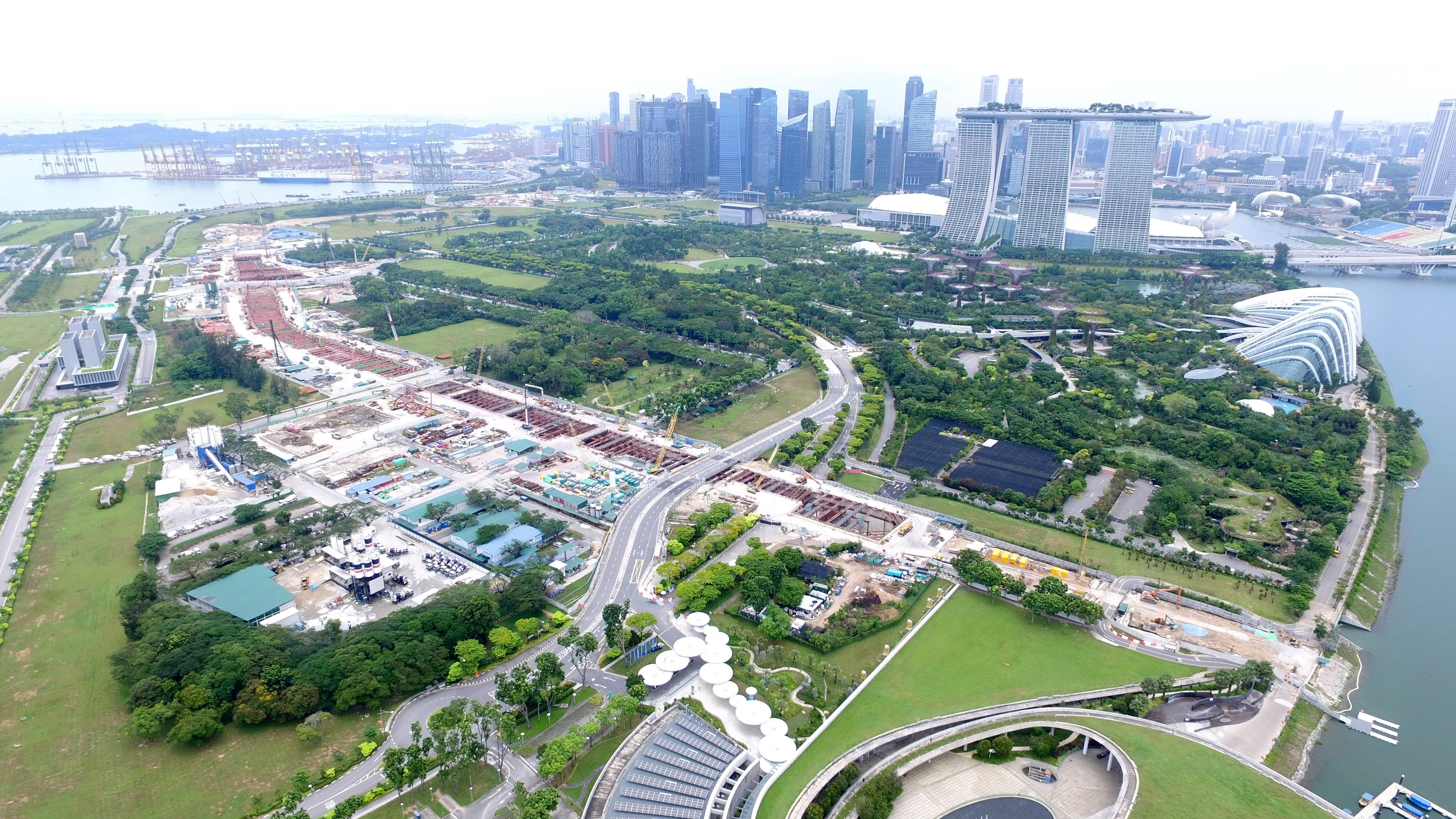
Station under construction in 2017 with the Marina Bay Sands and the Gardens by the Bay in the background. The construction site of Marina South station is also visible.

The station was first announced on 29 August 2012 as part of the Thomson Line (TSL). Contract T228 for the design and construction of Gardens by the Bay Station and associated tunnels was awarded to Nishimatsu Construction Co. Ltd – Bachy Soletanche Singapore Pte Ltd Joint Venture at S$331 million (US$247 million) in July 2014. Construction started in 2014, with an initial set completion date of 2021.

On 15 August 2014, the Land Transport Authority (LTA) announced that the TSL would merge with the Eastern Region Line to form the Thomson–East Coast Line (TEL). Gardens by the Bay station, part of the proposed line, would be constructed as part of TEL 3, consisting of 13 stations from Mount Pleasant to this station. With restrictions imposed on construction due to the COVID-19 pandemic, the TEL 3 completion date was pushed by one year to 2022.

On 9 March 2022, then Transport Minister S Iswaran announced in Parliament that TEL 3 would open in the second half of that year. As confirmed during a visit by Iswaran at the Outram Park and Maxwell stations on 7 October 2022, the station began operations on 13 November.

== Details ==
Gardens by the Bay station serves the TEL and is between the Marina Bay and Tanjong Rhu stations. The station code is TE22. The station is operated by SMRT Trains, the operator of the TEL. Train frequencies range from 3 to 6 minutes.

The station has three entrances serving Gardens by the Bay and the Marina Barrage. The station features 288 bicycle parking lots, and is a designated Civil Defence shelter.

Planting Shadows by Vertical Submarine is displayed at this station as part of the Art-in-Transit programme, a showcase of public artworks on the MRT network. The work features shadows of tropical plants adapted from drawings of plants during Singapore's colonial era. The artwork intends to connect the past with the present Gardens by the Bay, while calling to attention the absence of nature in Singapore's urban environment.

== Gallery ==
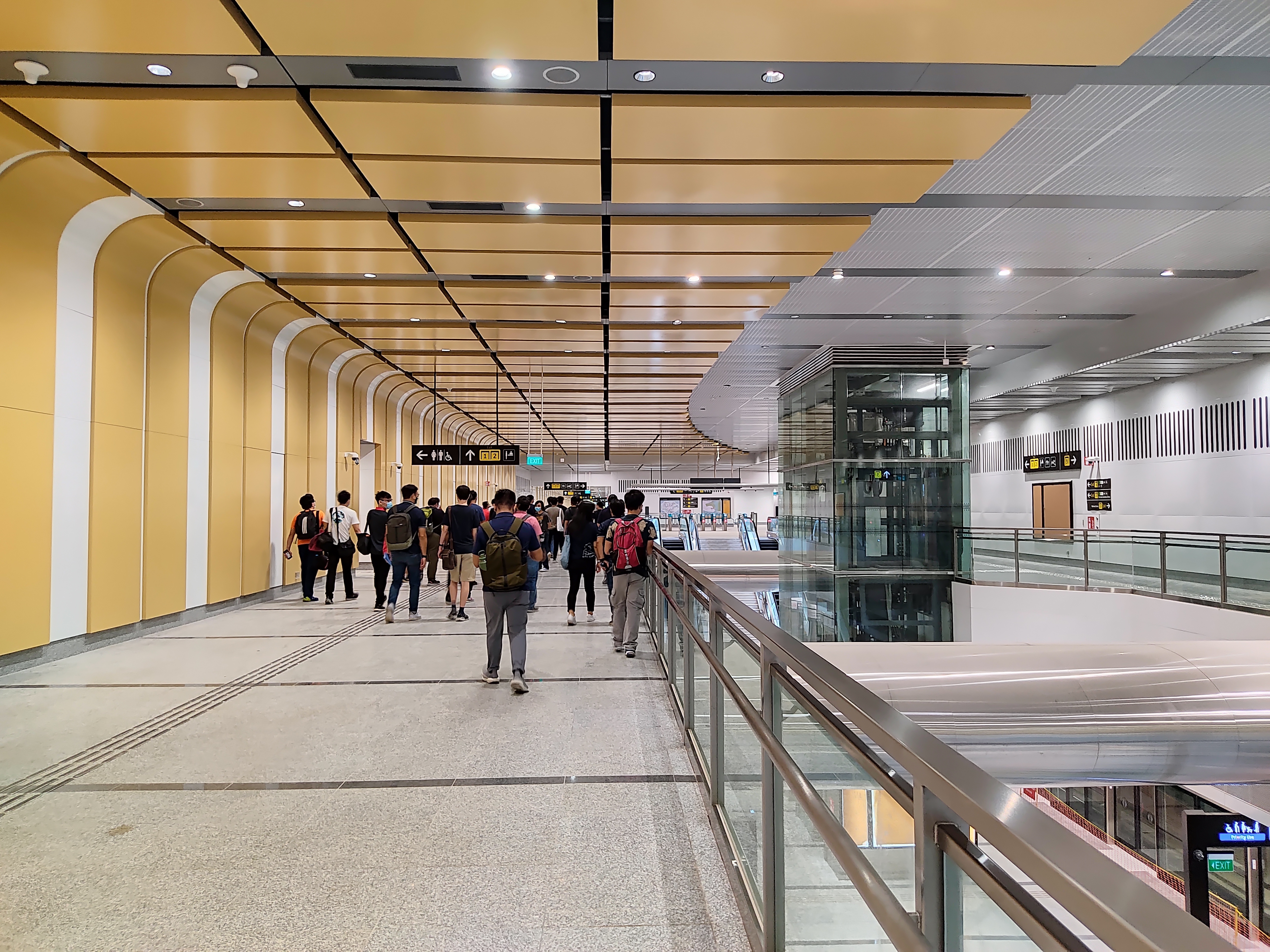
The concourse

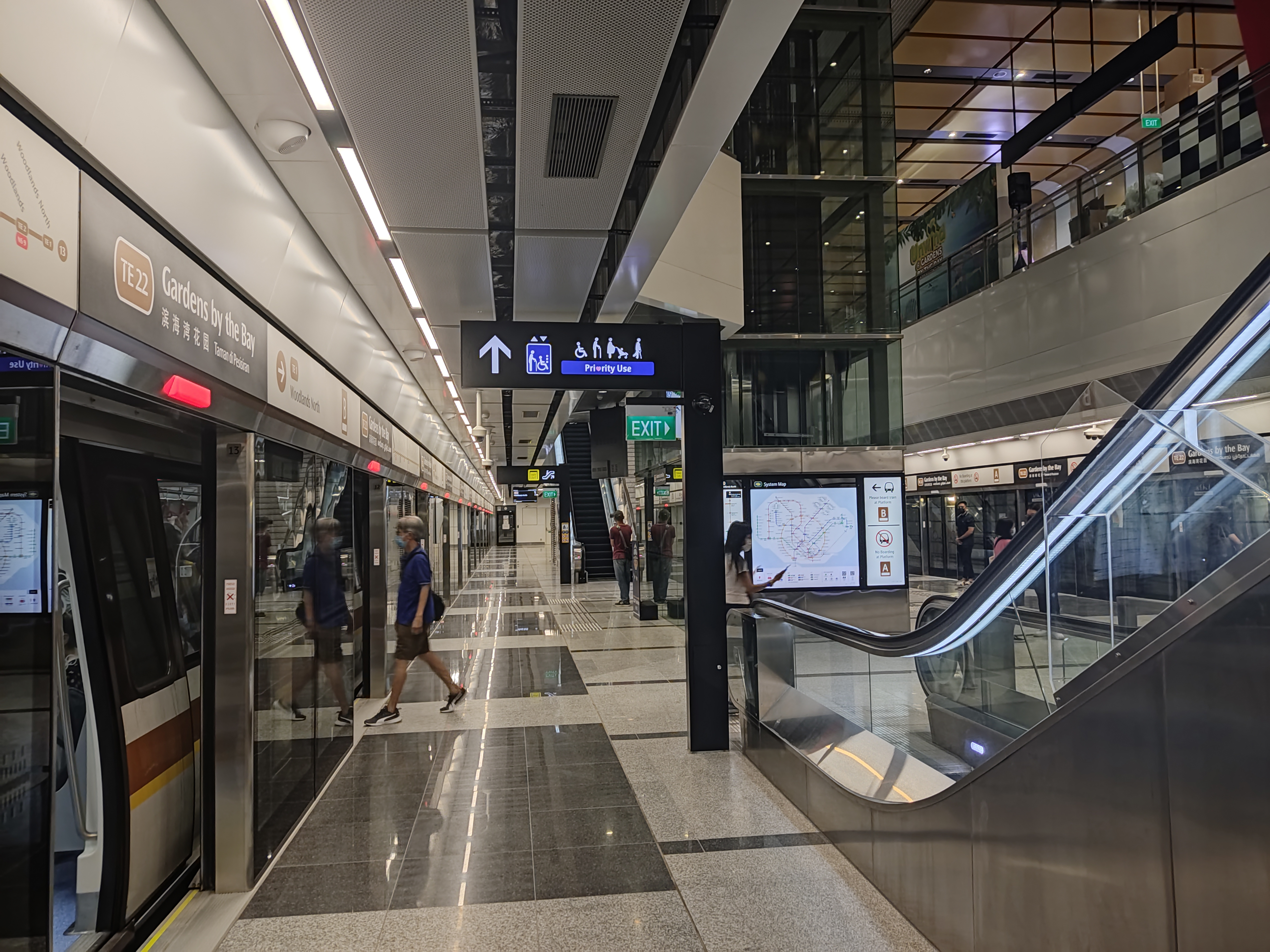
The platforms

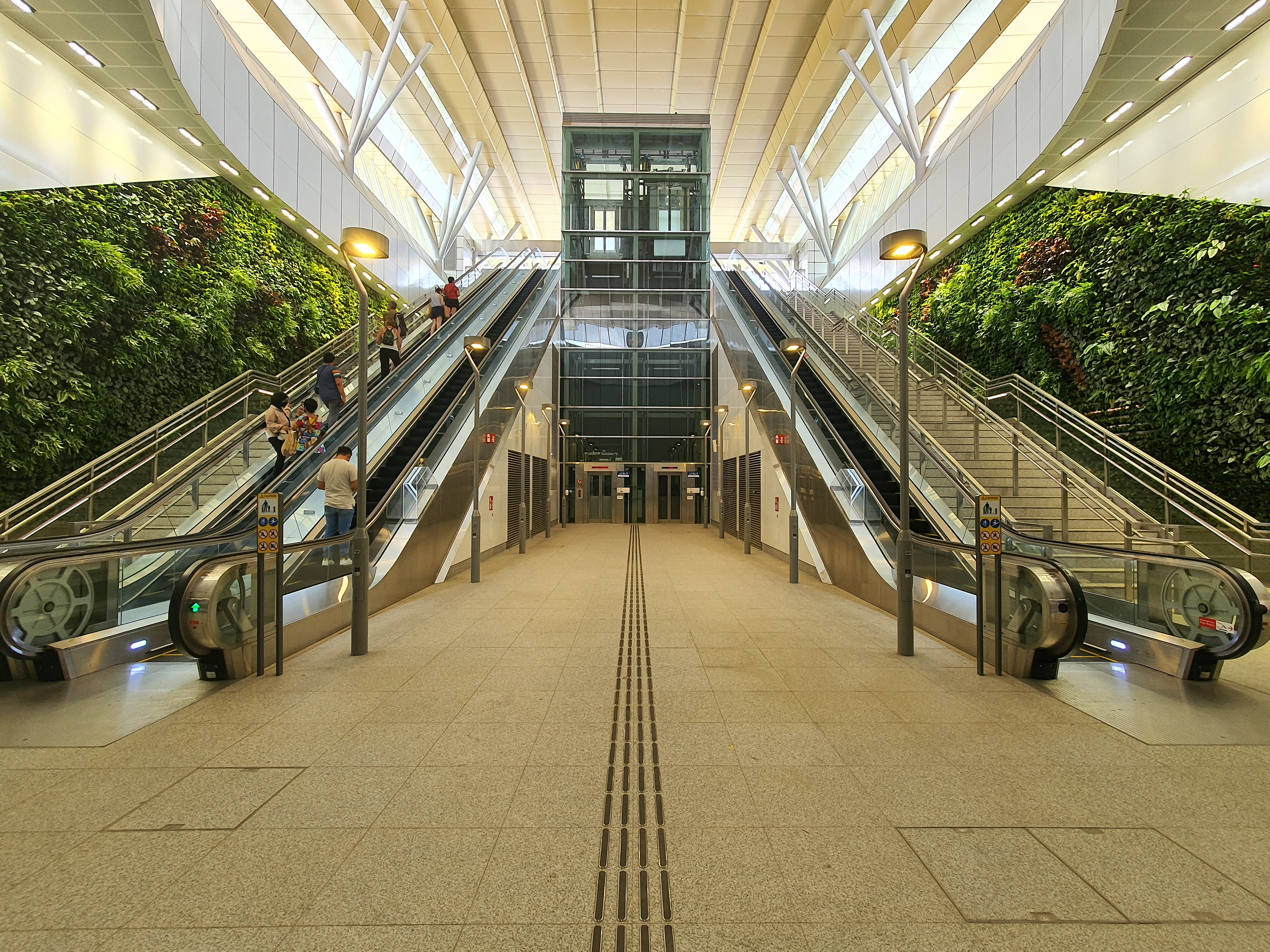
Exit 1 escalators, with greenery on the side
