= Eng Tow =

Singaporean artist

Eng Tow 杜瑛
- Born: October 1, 1947 (age 78); Singapore
- Education: Foundation studies, (Nanyang Academy of Fine Arts, Coventry College of Art, 1969); BFA (Winchester School of Art, 1972); MFA (Royal College of Art, 1974)
- Known for: Textile arts, printmaking, papermaking, abstract painting, collage, sculpture
- Movement: Contemporary art
- Website: http://www.engtow-artist.com/

Eng Tow (Chinese: 杜瑛; pinyin: Dù Yīng, born 1 October 1947) is a Singaporean contemporary artist best known for her use of cloth as medium in her art, creating textile paintings or methodically constructed "cloth reliefs". Tow’s practice further spans a range of media, including cast and collaged paperworks, abstract paintings, and sculpture. Her works often take from her environments and a deep connection with nature to express notions of metaphysical beauty. Coming into prominence in 1980s Singapore, Tow has exhibited both locally and overseas.

== Education and personal life ==
Tow studied art at the Nanyang Academy of Fine Arts (NAFA) in Singapore, leaving for England to further her studies at Coventry College of Art, where she completed her foundation studies in 1969. She then studied at the Winchester School of Art in Hampshire, graduating in 1972 with a Bachelor of Arts with first-class honours. She obtained her Master of Arts in 1974 from the Royal College of Art in London.

Tow's father was a businessman based in Singapore, while her brother Tow Theow Huang is also an artist, similarly receiving his art education in London.

== Career ==
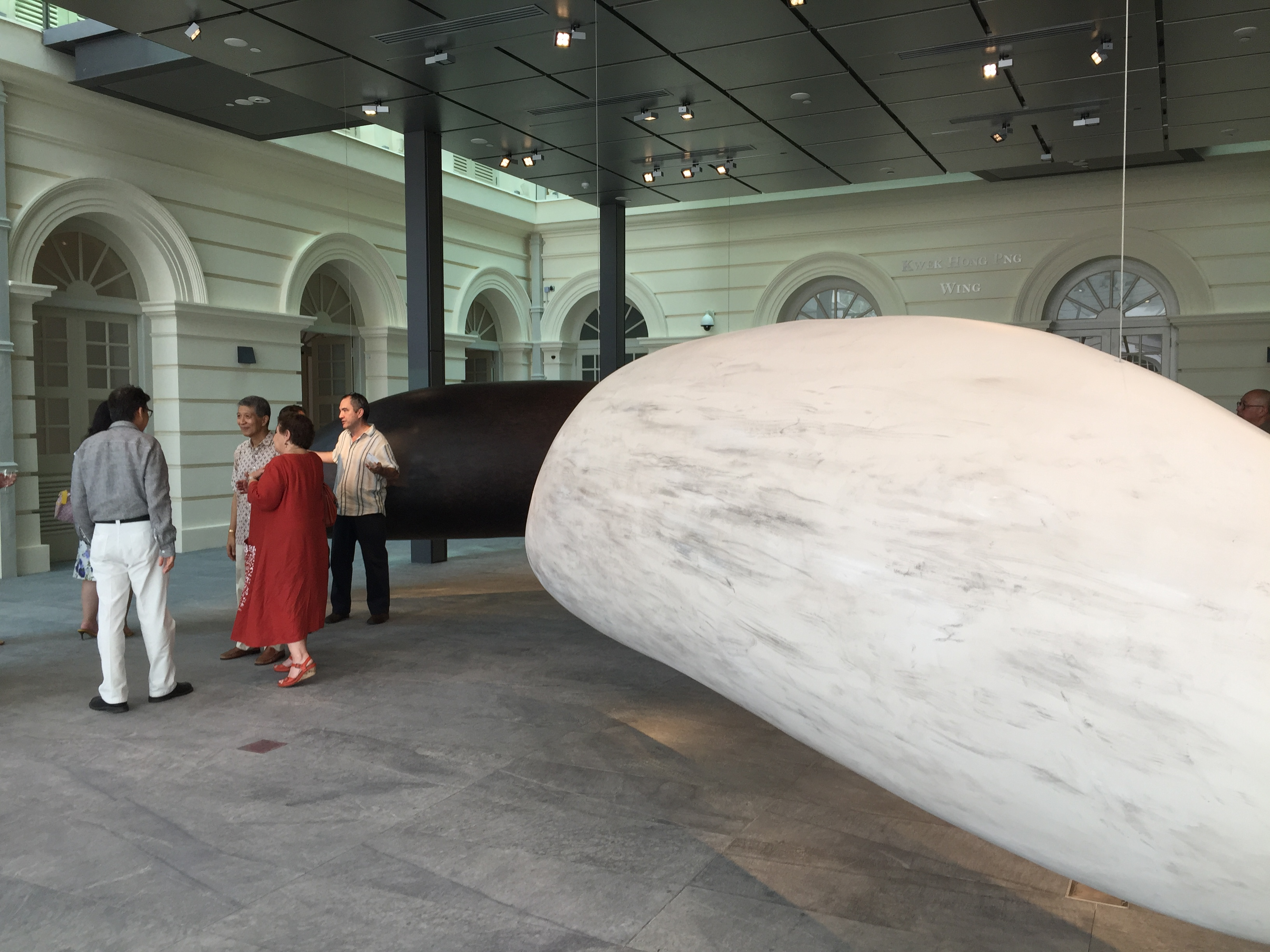
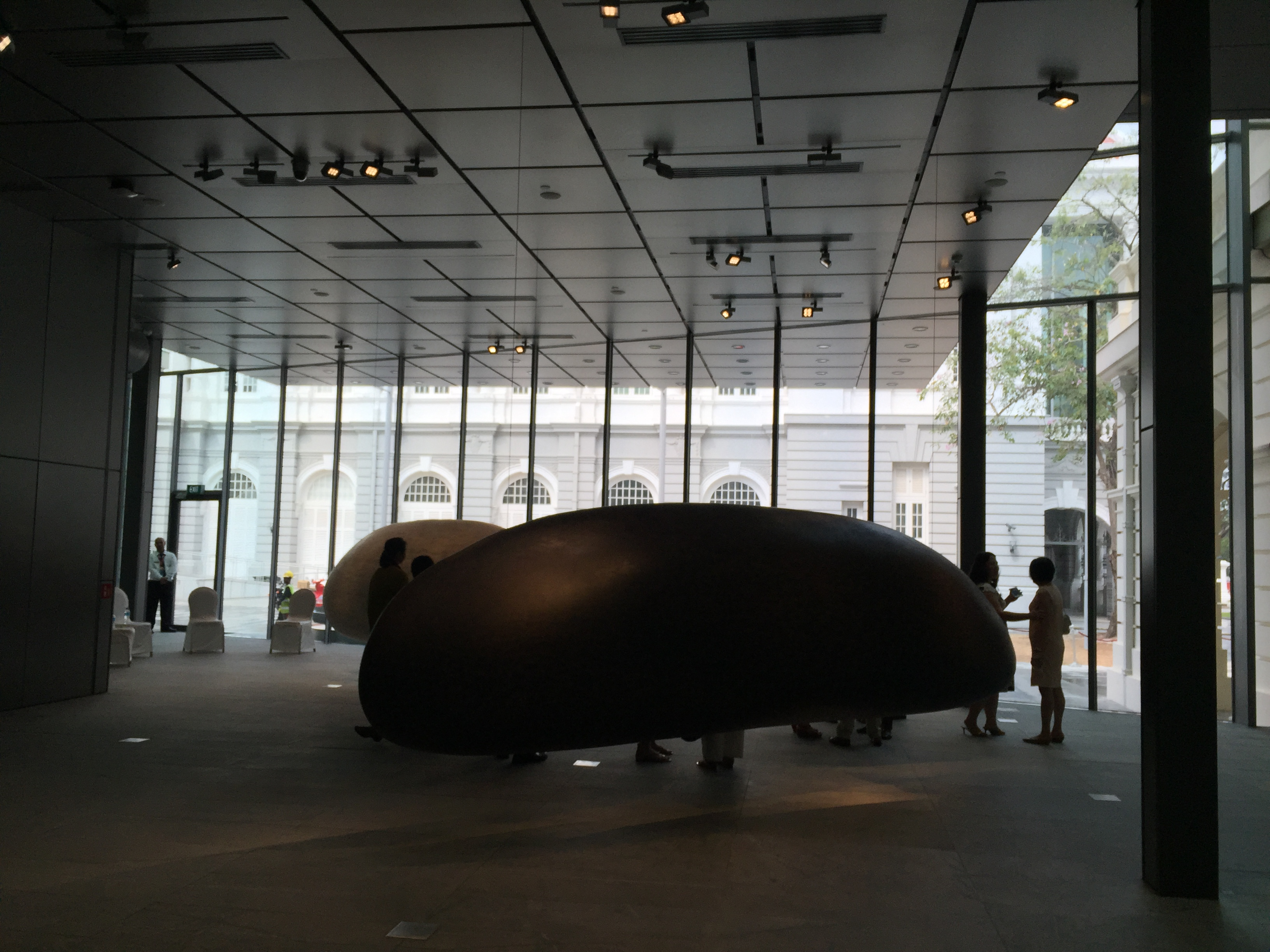
Eng Tow, Grains of Thought (2015) at the Asian Civilisations Museum.

Following her graduation in 1974, Tow remained in London for several years, working as a freelance textile designer. Selling her works to companies such as Courtaulds and the Designers Guild, Tow's designs were represented in Europe and the United States. Throughout her career, Tow served as both artist and educator. From 1976 and 1981, she also lectured at various institutions in the UK, such as Buckinghamshire College of Higher Education, Trent Polytechnic, West Surrey College of Art, and University of London Goldsmiths College. In 1977, with a grant from the Crafts Council, Tow established a workshop with fellow artists and craftsmen to teach, exhibit, and design in various parts of the United Kingdom. In 1978, Tow won an award for textile design in Britain, continuing to make a living mostly through private commissions and teaching.

Tow relocated to Singapore in 1981, working with interior designers and designing book covers, endpapers, furniture, accessories, and tapestries, also creating theatre sets and props. She also worked on a commission from the LTA. Tow was also a visiting lecturer at the National University of Singapore’s School of Architecture in 1988. She would also hold papermaking workshops at the same department in 1990, also conducting plant-drawing workshops for children at the Singapore Botanic Gardens.

From 1996 to 1999, Tow was based in Perth, Australia as an adjunct staff member at the Curtin University of Technology’s School of Art. Following this in 2000, she was a course supervisor for Curtin University at their Singapore campus. The same year, she was also a member of the Foundation Course Advisory Committee for the LASALLE-SIA College of the Arts, Singapore.

In 2015, the revamped Asian Civilisations Museum in Singapore had its new contemporary project gallery inaugurated by the installation Grains of Thought (2015) by Tow. Featuring two large ovoid carbon-fibre sculptures covered in acrylic paint, the work sought to "draw attention to rice, life and culture" as the grains are a staple across communities in Asia. In 2019, Grains of Thought was relocated to Jewel Changi Airport after it was gifted to them by the Asian Civilisations Museum and the National Heritage Board in 2018.

In 2021, Tow's practice was featured as part of the exhibition Something New Must Turn Up: Six Singaporean Artists After 1965, with her section titled the sixth sense. The exhibition sought to examine key shifts in Tow's practice, from her textile works to abstract paintings.

== Art ==
Tow is predominantly known for her textile paintings or “cloth reliefs”. Her cloth piece White on White (1983) was part of a travelling exhibition in the United States in 1991, considered by The Washington Times as a work that represented a modest reinvention of conventional art media. Tow’s early textile practice was also presented in the regional ASEAN exhibitions in 1982. While Tow's early career revolves around textiles, she started developing an interest in printmaking and papermaking in the 1980s with her works since then revealing an interdisciplinary approach that incorporates mixed media.

== Exhibitions ==
1974

- Royal College of Art, Degree Show & Convocation, Royal College of Art, London, England
- Royal College of Art, Paintings & Textiles Arts Centre, Folkstone, England

1975

- Texprint Il, The Design Centre, London, England

1976

- Inaugural Show, National Museum Art Gallery, Singapore
- The National Museum Art Gallery Official Opening, National Museum Art Gallery, Singapore
- Colour, National Museum Art Gallery, Singapore

1977

- Selections Paintings & Sculpture, Alpha Gallery, Singapore
- High Standards — Queen's Silver Jubilee Exhibition, Victoria and Albert Museum, London, England
- Art 77, First Anniversary Exhibition, The National Gallery, Singapore
- *Quilted Wallhangings, 21 Antiques Gallery, London, England

1978

- Exhibition of Contemporary Quilts, The American Museum, Somerset, England
- The British Crafts Award 1978, Somerset House, London, England
- Carousel, Crafts Council Gallery, London, England

1979

- Tapestries of Today, Contemporary Art Society, Reed House, London, England
- Homespun to Highspeed: A Century of British Design, Mappin Art Gallery, Sheffield, Yorkshire, England
- The Bowl, British Crafts Council, London, England

1980

- Approaches to Metal and Cloth, British Crafts Centre, London, England
- Contemporary British Crafts, Sothebys - Torquay, London, UK; Munich, Germany

1981

- Textikunst 1981, Institut für Künstlerische, Linz, Austria
- Contemporary Art, Alpha Gallery, Singapore

1982

- The Maker's Eye, Craft Council Gallery, London, England
- New Format, National Museum Art Gallery, Singapore
- British Needlework, National Museum of Modern Art, Kyoto, Japan
- *Works on Cloth, Goethe-Institut, Singapore
- Festival of Arts, National Museum Art Gallery, Singapore
- British Needlework, National Museum of Modern Art, Tokyo, Japan
- ASEAN Exhibition of Paintings and Photographs - Landscape in contemporary Art Forms 13.12.1982-28.01.1983, National Art Gallery, Kuala Lumpur, Malaysia. Gunung Galunggung, Cloth relief, 1982

1983

- Contemporary Textile Art, Citibank's Robina House Branch, Singapore

1984

- Inspiration, Alpha Gallery, Singapore

2021

- Something New Must Turn Up: Six Singaporean Artists After 1965, National Gallery Singapore, Singapore

*solo exhibitions
