= Traditional Chinese roofing =

Roofing in historic Chinese architecture

Traditional Chinese roofing refers to the numerous types of roofing, and roofing elements, employed in historic Chinese architecture. Traditional Chinese architecture employed a number of different roofing styles, which utilized different shapes, slopes, and ridges. The types of roofs would vary by historical era, with certain types of roofs gaining particular prominence through the reigns of certain dynasties. Other factors which shaped roofs in traditional Chinese architecture included precipitation and cultural connotations.

== Varieties ==
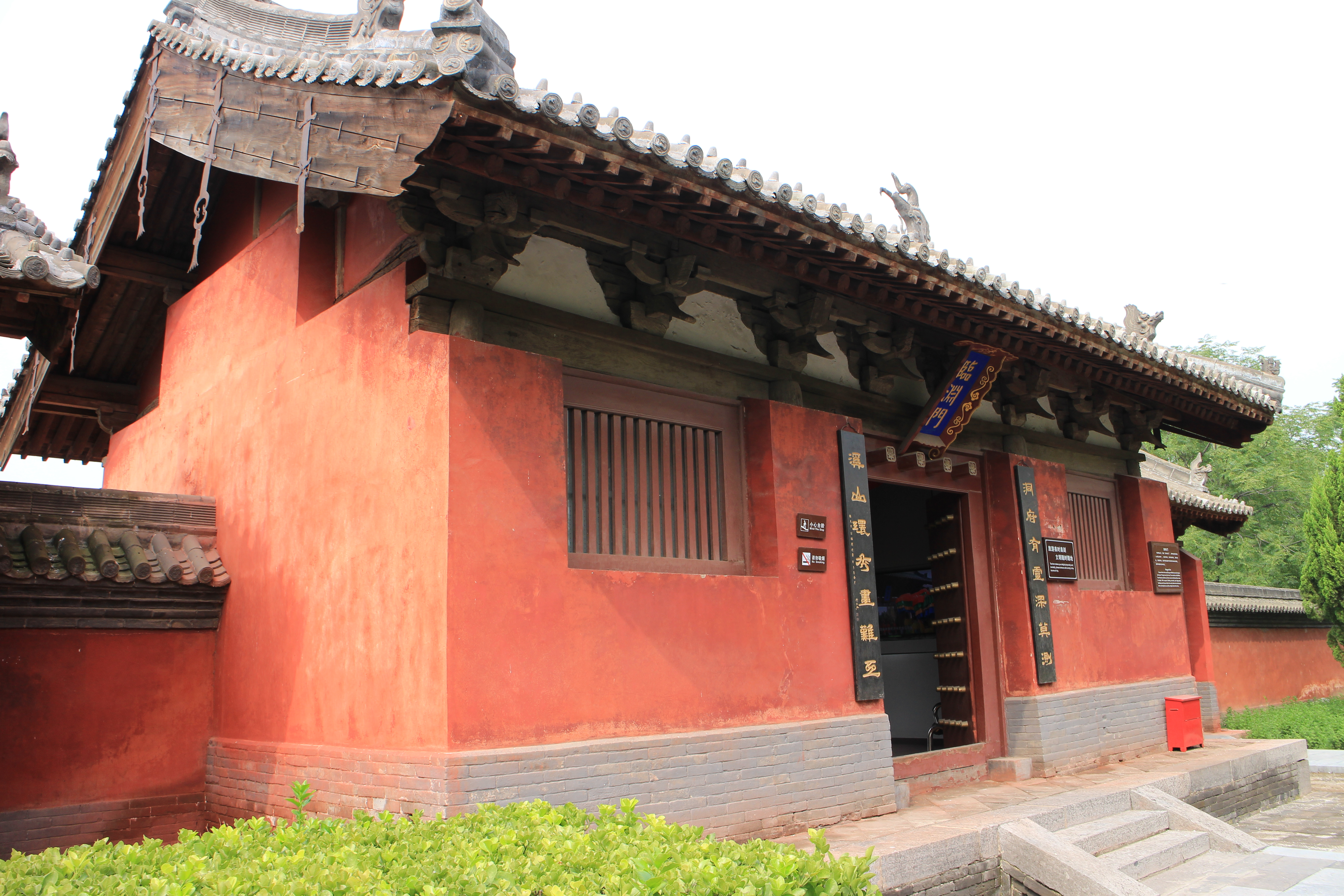
A xuanshan roof, similar to a gable roof except for its eaves on all four sides

Traditional Chinese architecture employed numerous different roofing styles, most of which were sloped, although some flat roofs (Chinese: 平屋顶; pinyin: píng wūdǐng) were employed. Flat roofs were particularly common in regions of Chinese with less precipitation, such as northern China. Among sloped roofs (Chinese: 坡屋顶; pinyin: pō wūdǐng), traditional Chinese architecture employs single slope roofs (Chinese: 單坡顶; pinyin: dān pō dǐng), two slope roofs (Chinese: 两坡顶; pinyin: liǎng pō dǐng), and four slope roofs (Chinese: 四坡顶; pinyin: sì pō dǐng). Depending on the type of gable employed, there are two styles of two slope roofs: gable roofs (Chinese: 硬山顶; pinyin: yìngshān dǐng, also known as baoguiqi) and xuanshan roofs (Chinese: 悬山顶; pinyin: xuánshān dǐng, also known as overhanging gable roofs). Among four slope roofs, there are two styles: the five-ridged hip roof (Chinese: 庑殿顶; pinyin: wǔdiàn dǐng, also called the Chinese Hipped Roof or the fudian roof) and the nine-ridged xieshan roof (Chinese: 歇山顶; pinyin: xiēshān dǐng).

Traditional Chinese architecture also includes many types of tented roofs (Chinese: 攒尖顶; pinyin: zǎnjiān dǐng), including three-corner tents (Chinese: 三角攒尖; pinyin: sānjiǎo zǎnjiān), four-corner tents (Chinese: 四角攒尖; pinyin: sìjiǎo zǎnjiān), six-corner tents (Chinese: 六角攒尖; pinyin: liùjiǎo zǎnjiān), eight-corner tents (Chinese: 八角攒尖; pinyin: bājiǎo zǎnjiān), and rounded tents (Chinese: 圆攒尖; pinyin: yuán zǎnjiān).

Ridgeless roofs, such as cuanjian roofs, have also been employed in traditional Chinese roofing, most notably, perhaps, in the Hall of Prayer for Good Harvests at the Temple of Heaven.

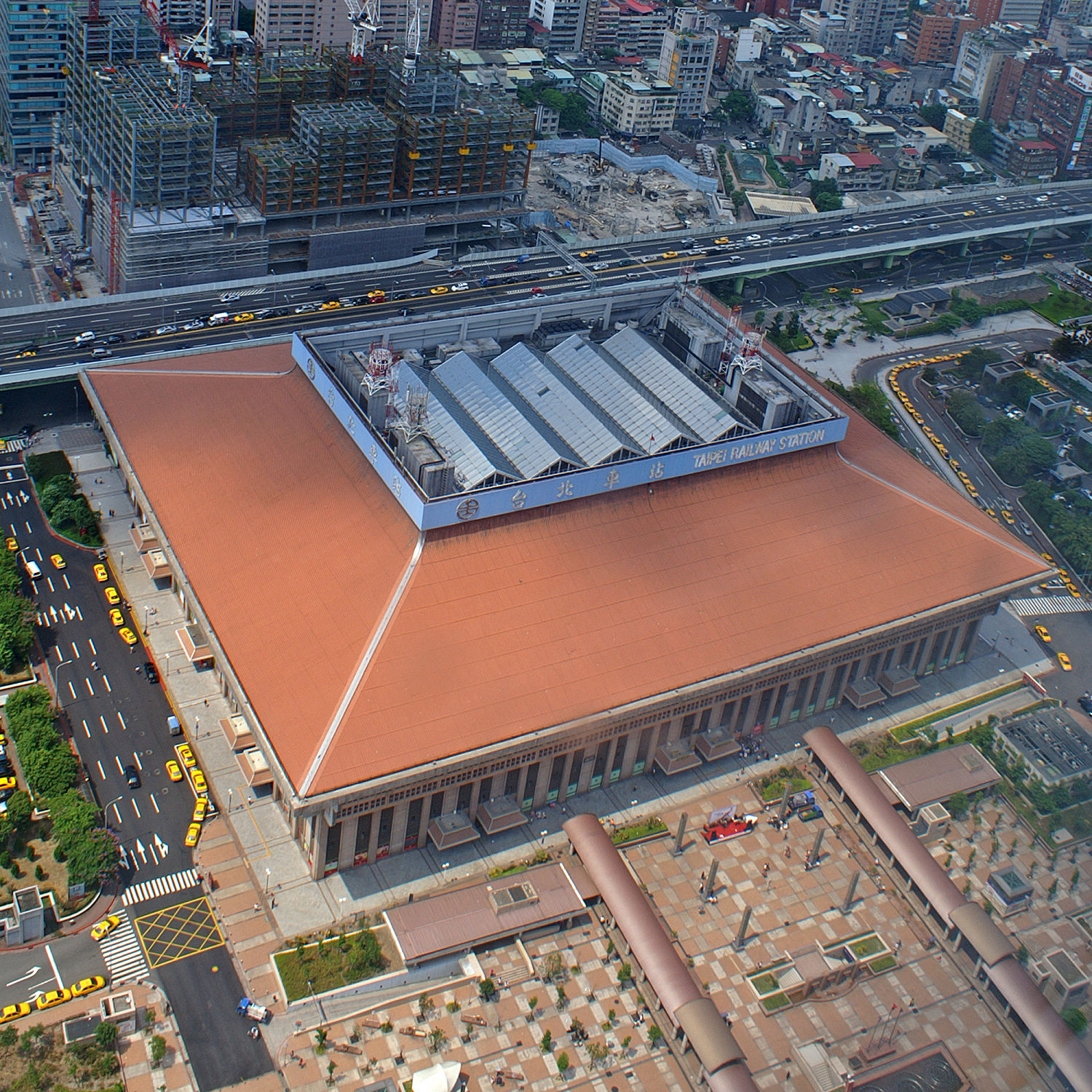
A modern reconstruction of a lu roof, defined by its flat top and four diagonal ridges, on Taipei Main Station

Other roof types include kui roofs (Chinese: 盔顶; pinyin: kuī dǐng), lu roofs (Chinese: 盝顶; pinyin: lù dǐng, also called open flat roofs), and cross roofs (Chinese: 十字脊顶; pinyin: shízì jí dǐng). Lu roofs have a flat top, with four diagonal ridges surrounding the top. These roofs were particularly common throughout the Yuan dynasty.

Some traditional Chinese buildings have swastika-shaped roofs (Chinese: 卐字顶; pinyin: wànzì dǐng), due to the shape's historic connotations of luck and auspiciousness.

Roofs joined by multiple pieces, known as joined roofs (Chinese: 句连搭顶; pinyin: gōu lián dā dǐng) were often constructed in traditional Chinese architecture to enable a large floor area without much height.

Roofs with juanpeng ridges (Chinese: 卷棚脊; pinyin: juǎnpéng jí), known as juanpeng roofs (Chinese: 卷棚顶; pinyin: juǎnpéng dǐng) or parabolic roofs, have been common in Chinese architecture since ancient times. Many buildings at the Chengde Mountain Resort, a Qing dynasty complex of imperial palaces, employ juanpeng roofs.

Checkerboard roofs (Chinese: 棋盘心屋面顶; pinyin: qípán xīn wūmiàn dǐng), named due to their checkered patterns, have also been employed in residential architecture.

== Elements ==
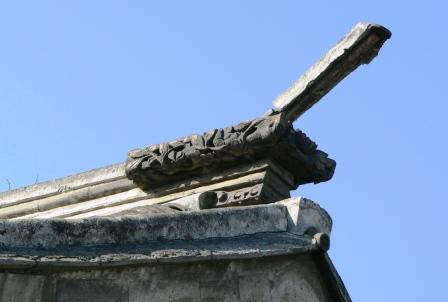
A qingshui ridge on the end of a roof

Traditional Chinese roofs are also distinguished by a number of distinct roofing elements, such as ridges. In addition to the main ridges (Chinese: 大脊; pinyin: dà jí), certain traditional Chinese roofs have additional ornamental ridges, such as qingshui ridges (Chinese: 清水脊; pinyin: qīngshuǐ jí) and juanpeng ridges (Chinese: 卷棚脊; pinyin: juǎnpéng jí).

Certain types of xuanshan roofs (Chinese: 悬山顶; pinyin: xuánshān dǐng, also known as overhanging gable roofs) employ juanpeng ridges at each end of the gable, in lieu of a main ridge.

In the county-level city of Jinjiang, in Fujian province, many older houses have downspouts (known locally as chuizhu) coming down from the edges of their roofs.

== See also ==
- Chinese architecture
- List of roof shapes
