= Vertical Submarine =

Vertical Submarine is a collective group of artists based in Singapore. The group, founded by Justin Loke, Joshua Yang (former member) and Fiona Koh (former member) was formed in 2003 and the name was taken from a word subvert that is rotated to be vert-sub and expanded to form Vertical Submarine. The group has been appearing in exhibitions of intricate installations involving everyday objects, text and an acquired sense of humor.

The group won the Singapore President's Young Talents Award of 2009. Vertical Submarine participated in ROUNDTABLE: The 9th Gwangju Biennale, which takes place September 7 – November 11, 2012 in Gwangju, Korea.

== Exhibitions ==
=== Selected exhibitions ===
==== Penetrations ====
Penetrations is a series of works addressing language policy and identity in Singapore and the decline of local dialects. It draws on rhyming verses in Hokkien, presented in the form of old-style advertisements and illustrations. It was presented at Chan Hampe Galleries, Singapore.

==== Planting Shadows ====
In Singapore Botanic Gardens they created an in-situ installation, Planting Shadows consisting of a patch of gray sunflowers in the middle of the garden. It comes with a small note at the bottom referring to Chien Swee-Teng’s poem about a sunflower plantation owner’s pact with a bottle imp where he gives up his sense of color for the success of his business. But there is a hidden twist to this exhibit: There is no Chien Swee-Teng or poem – the collective invented the writer and his poem about avarice.

==== Analogic ====
Analogic, is an antithetical exhibition by Vertical Submarine. The title, Analogic with prefix ANA- means “against”, suggests a frivolity, nonsensical exercise of wit.
Exhibition Text:
“Vertical Submarine’s ANALOGIC features a series of paintings inspired by the concept of analogy and its proximity to the past as expounded in Umberto Eco’s novel, Foucault’s Pendulum. In the exhibition, the paintings are presented as image sequences of related words, concepts and objects. Based on Eco’s concept of tying things up and linking seemingly diverse and unrelated concepts into one work, Vertical Submarine delves into an exploration of ‘analogy’ and ‘analogue’, creating in the process a nostalgic act of journeying back to the analogue era.”

==== Flirting Point ====
Flirting Point is a lighthearted satire of the behavior of Singaporeans and their culture. Singapore living is generally perceived as being so restricted and regulated. Therefore this work is trying to suggest that even flirting has to be restricted to a designated area.

==== A View With A Room ====
This exhibition is done by the collective group as part of the Singapore's Young Talents Awards. A View With A Room is an installation that presents a continuation of Vertical Submarine’s earlier inquiries into the relationship between text, image and representation. In particular, their installation explores the process of translating words into images, in the viewers’ as well as the artists’ imaginations, which are then realized in three-dimensional form.

== Awards ==
- Singapore President's Young Talents Award The group won this award based on their exhibition at Singapore Art Museum 8Q, titled A View With A Room. As part of the award, sponsored by Credit Suisse, the group will go for a residency at Pasaguero. It is a venue for Mexican contemporary art, music and fashion located in Mexico City, Mexico. Their work is still up for viewing until 27 December 2010.

== Controversy ==
In September 2014, Vertical Submarine's exhibition Eville at the Singapore Night Festival drew protest from animal welfare groups after flyers urging people to “kill stray cats” were taken out of context. The flyer was in fact part of a satirical performance-exhibition against evil acts, commissioned by the Singapore Kindness Movement. The art group issued a statement saying, “The flyers were not distributed to the public for the purpose of advocacy but scattered as part of the performance. We do not advocate or condone the killing of stray cats. On the contrary, we are pleased that the issue of cat abuse is highlighted". The animal welfare groups subsequently apologised for posting the flyers on their social media platforms.
