= FA Community Shield =

Annual match in English football

- Organiser(s): The Football Association
- Founded: 1908; 118 years ago
- Region: England
- Teams: 2
- Related competitions: Sheriff of London Charity Shield (predecessor); FA Cup (qualifier); Premier League (qualifier)
- Current champions: Arsenal (18th title)
- Most championships: Manchester United (21 titles)
- Broadcaster(s): TNT Sports; Sky Sports; BBC Sport
- Website: thefa.com/communityshield
- 2026 FA Community Shield

The Football Association Community Shield (formerly the Charity Shield) is an annual match in English football contested at Wembley Stadium between the champions of the previous Premier League season and the holders of the FA Cup. If the same team wins both the league and the FA Cup, the match is played against the Premier League runners-up. The competition is the equivalent of the domestic super cup in other countries.

Organised by the FA, the match generates proceeds that are directed towards community initiatives and charitable causes across the country. Revenue from ticket sales and match programmes is distributed among the 124 clubs that took part in the FA Cup from the first round proper onwards, with each club nominating charities or projects to receive the funds. The remaining balance is allocated to the FA's national charity partners. First played in the 1908–09 season as a replacement for the Sheriff of London Charity Shield, the match has since become a regular fixture.

The current holders are 2025–26 Premier League champions Arsenal, who defeated 2025–26 FA Cup winners Manchester City 3–0 in the 2026 fixture.

== History ==
The Community Shield evolved from the Sheriff of London Charity Shield, introduced in 1898, which was originally contested between teams of professionals and amateurs, reflecting the 'gentlemen and players' tradition. The Football Association Charity Shield, as it was then known, was created to replace the Sheriff of London Charity Shield after leading amateur clubs became estranged from the FA. The inaugural match in 1908 was played between Manchester United, the Football League First Division champions, and Queens Park Rangers, the Southern League champions. After a 1–1 draw in the first game, United won 4–0 in the replay, marking the only occasion the Shield required a second leg. Both matches were played at Stamford Bridge.

The format of the competition varied in its early years. In 1913 it featured Amateurs versus Professionals XIs, and in 1921 the Shield was first contested between the Football League and FA Cup winners, after the Southern League was absorbed into the English football league system. Throughout the 1920s the fixture often continued the amateur versus professional theme, including the 1927 match between Cardiff City as FA Cup holders and the Corinthians representing the amateurs. In 1930 the competition settled into its now-familiar format of pitting the league champions against the FA Cup winners, with few exceptions. Notable deviations include the 1950 Shield between the England national team and an FA team returning from a tour of Canada, and the 1961 fixture where double-winning Tottenham Hotspur played a Football Association XI.

The match has been held at the start of the season since 1959. Situations where one club won both the league and FA Cup created inconsistencies in opposition. In 1971, Arsenal declined to participate due to prior commitments, so Leicester City, as Second Division champions, faced FA Cup runners-up Liverpool and won the trophy, despite having never previously won the League or FA Cup. In 1972 and 1973, several clubs declined invitations, leading to irregular pairings such as Manchester City versus Aston Villa and Burnley. In 1974, FA secretary Ted Croker formalised the modern format of league champions versus FA Cup winners, hosted annually at Wembley Stadium. Between 1949 and 1991, eleven editions of the Shield were shared following drawn results, but since 1993, penalty shoot-outs have been used to determine a winner.

The formation of the Premier League in 1992 led to the Shield becoming a showcase between the Premier League and FA Cup winners starting from the 1993 edition. In 2002, the Charity Commission ruled that the Football Association had failed to fulfil its charitable obligations, including delays in disbursing funds and a lack of transparency over gate revenue allocation. This led to the competition being renamed the Community Shield. Arsenal won the first edition under the new name, defeating Liverpool 1–0.

== Trophy ==
In 2016, the FA's official silverware supplier, Thomas Lyte, restored and rebuilt the original 1908 Shield to mark the 50th anniversary of England's 1966 FIFA World Cup triumph. The trophy was then auctioned for £40,000 to support the Bobby Moore Fund for Cancer Research UK, which became the FA's official charity partner that year. The auction was held at The Royal Garden Hotel in Kensington, the same venue where England had celebrated their 1966 victory.

In 2002, Thomas Lyte made the present day Community Shield, and restores it annually. They also designed and make the medals for both the winners and runners-up.

== Rules ==
The rules of the Community Shield are generally the same as those of the Premier League, with a team of 11 starting players and 9 substitutes. However, unlike in most other competitions where only five substitutions are permitted, teams in the Community Shield are permitted up to six substitutions. If the scores are level after 90 minutes, the teams play a penalty shootout. If a team wins both the Premier League and the FA Cup, the runners-up from the Premier League will be the opposition.

== Status ==
Serving as England's super cup between the previous season's Premier League champions and FA Cup winners, the Community Shield is regarded as the "curtain-raiser" and is the first competitive game of each top-flight English football season. However, it has been treated with varying degrees of seriousness by participating teams, with some using it similarly to friendlies in their pre-season schedule – as an opportunity to give match practice to fringe members of their squads or those returning from injury. BBC Sport pundit Mark Lawrenson and The Guardian writer Tom Bryant both described the match as a "glorified friendly". Prior to the 2008 FA Community Shield, Manchester United manager Sir Alex Ferguson summarised his opinion of the competition: "The Community Shield is a prestigious match but I have used players in it who were not quite fit... it's always a game we never quite use as a do or die thing; we use it as a barometer for fitness".

Others, however, continue to recognise the status of the match as the first official game and trophy of the domestic season. Ahead of the 2016 FA Community Shield against Manchester United, Leicester City manager Claudio Ranieri asked, "Why do you say this question, a friendly? When is the Community Shield a friendly? Of course we will be at the maximum and Manchester United will be at their maximum. The two teams want to win. I am very excited." The following year, Chelsea manager Antonio Conte affirmed the significance of the cup, stating "It is not a friendly game. It is an official game and there is a trophy so for us it must be important" ahead of his side's clash with Arsenal. Likewise in 2018, Manchester City manager Pep Guardiola referred to his side's clash with Chelsea in the competition as "the first final" of the season. Before winning his first community shield, former Liverpool manager Jürgen Klopp said "It would be nice if we could win it. It's the last domestic cup we haven't won."

== Records ==
- The most successful teams in the competition are Manchester United (17 outright wins, 4 shared), Arsenal (17 outright wins, 1 shared), Liverpool (11 outright wins, 5 shared) and Everton (8 outright wins, 1 shared).
- Chelsea (2010, 2012, 2015, 2017 and 2018) and Newcastle United (1932, 1951, 1952, 1955 and 1996) share the joint-longest run of appearances without winning or sharing the trophy.
- The highest scoring game was Manchester United's 8–4 win against Swindon Town in 1911.
- Everton hold the record for most consecutive wins (4) from 1984 to 1987; however, the 1986 'win' was shared with Liverpool. Manchester United hold the record for most consecutive losses (4) from 1998 to 2001. During this period Manchester United also held the record for most consecutive games played (6) from 1996 to 2001 in which they won 2.
- Tottenham Hotspur goalkeeper Pat Jennings scored against Manchester United from his own penalty area in the 1967 Charity Shield, which was shared at 3–3.
- Brighton & Hove Albion are the only club to win just the Shield (in 1910), never the FA Cup or the League. In the five years that the Charity Shield was contested by the winners of the Football League and Southern League between 1908 and 1912, this was the only occasion on which the Southern League champions prevailed. The victory remains Brighton's only national honour to date and they were crowned the 'Champions of all England'.

== Venues ==
Multiple guest and neutral hosts
Ground	Hosts	Years
Stamford Bridge, London	10	1908, 1909, 1910, 1911, 1923, 1927, 1930, 1950, 1955, 1970
Highbury, London	7	1924, 1934, 1935, 1938, 1948, 1949, 1953
White Hart Lane, London	6	1912, 1920, 1921, 1925, 1951, 1961
Old Trafford, Manchester	6	1922, 1928, 1952, 1957, 1965, 1967
Maine Road, Manchester	5	1926, 1937, 1956, 1968, 1973
Villa Park, Birmingham	3	1931, 1972, 2012
Goodison Park, Liverpool	3	1933, 1963, 1966
The Den, London	2	1913, 1929
Molineux, Wolverhampton	2	1954, 1959

For purposes of clarity, venues mentioned in italics in this section no longer exist.

=== Permanent venues ===
Since 1974, the Community Shield has been at a permanent home rather than guest venues.

- Old Wembley Stadium: 1974–2000
- Principality Stadium (also known as the Millennium Stadium): 2001–2006, 2026
- New Wembley Stadium: 2007–2011, 2013–2021, 2023–2025

=== Neutral and guest host venues ===
The fixture was originally played at various neutral grounds or at the home ground of one of the competing teams. In total, there have been eighteen host grounds other than the aforementioned permanent three. The first ground to host the fixture was Stamford Bridge in 1908 and the last ground that guest hosted the fixture was the Principality Stadium in 2026, which was due to Wembley hosting pre-planned concerts.

Seven grounds have hosted the fixture once: St James' Park in 1932, Roker Park in 1936, Burnden Park in 1958, Turf Moor in 1960, Portman Road in 1962, Anfield in 1964 and Elland Road in 1969. Leicester City have hosted the fixture twice, at Filbert Street in 1971 and the King Power Stadium in 2022. A further nine grounds have hosted the fixture on multiple occasions (see table).

== Winners ==
=== By number of wins (clubs) ===
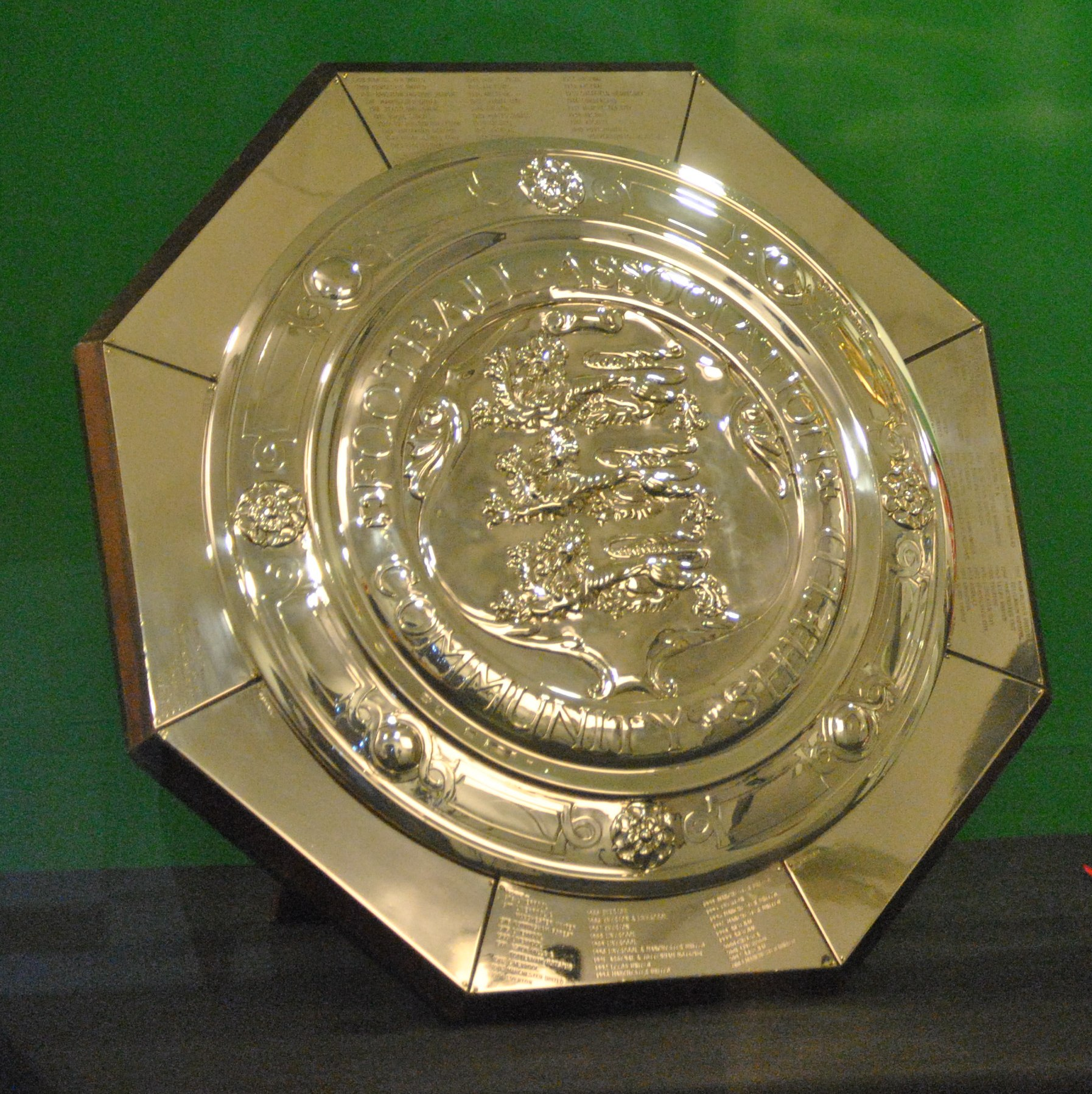
The trophy

Team	Wins (outright wins/shared titles)	Years (* title was shared)
Manchester United	21 (17/4)	1908, 1911, 1952, 1956, 1957, 1965*, 1967*, 1977*, 1983, 1990*, 1993, 1994, 1996, 1997, 2003, 2007, 2008, 2010, 2011, 2013, 2016
Arsenal	18 (17/1)	1930, 1931, 1933, 1934, 1938, 1948, 1953, 1991*, 1998, 1999, 2002, 2004, 2014, 2015, 2017, 2020, 2023, 2026
Liverpool	16 (11/5)	1964*, 1965*, 1966, 1974, 1976, 1977*, 1979, 1980, 1982, 1986*, 1988, 1989, 1990*, 2001, 2006, 2022
Everton	9 (8/1)	1928, 1932, 1963, 1970, 1984, 1985, 1986*, 1987, 1995
Manchester City	7	1937, 1968, 1972, 2012, 2018, 2019, 2024
Tottenham Hotspur	7 (4/3)	1921, 1951, 1961, 1962, 1967*, 1981*, 1991*
Chelsea	4	1955, 2000, 2005, 2009
Wolverhampton Wanderers	4 (1/3)	1949*, 1954*, 1959, 1960*
Leeds United	2	1969, 1992
Leicester City	2	1971, 2021
West Bromwich Albion	2 (1/1)	1920, 1954*
Burnley	2 (1/1)	1960*, 1973
Newcastle United	1	1909
Brighton & Hove Albion	1	1910
Blackburn Rovers	1	1912
Huddersfield Town	1	1922
Cardiff City	1	1927
Sheffield Wednesday	1	1935
Sunderland	1	1936
Bolton Wanderers	1	1958
Derby County	1	1975
Nottingham Forest	1	1978
Crystal Palace	1	2025
Portsmouth	1 (0/1)	1949*
West Ham United	1 (0/1)	1964*
Aston Villa	1 (0/1)	1981*

=== By number of wins (other) ===
Team	Wins	Years
English Professionals XI	4	1913, 1923, 1924, 1929
English Amateurs XI	2	1925, 1926
England 1950 FIFA World Cup XI	1	1950

== Winners and runners-up by competition ==
Competition	Wins	Shared	Runners-up
First Division/Premier League	54, including 6 as double winners: 1908, 1909, 1911, 1912, 1920, 1928, 1931, 1932, 1933, 1934, 1936, 1937, 1938, 1948, 1951, 1952, 1953, 1955, 1956, 1957, 1959, 1961, 1963, 1966, 1968, 1969, 1970, 1975, 1976, 1978, 1979, 1980, 1982, 1985, 1987, 1988, 1992, 1993, 1994, 1996, 1997, 1998, 2002, 2003, 2004, 2005, 2007, 2008, 2011, 2012, 2013, 2018, 2019, 2024, 2026	11, including 1 as double winner: 1949, 1954, 1960, 1964, 1965, 1967, 1977, 1981, 1986, 1990, 1991	27, including 3 as double winners: 1910, 1921, 1922, 1930, 1935, 1958, 1962, 1974, 1983, 1984, 1989, 1995, 1999, 2000, 2001, 2006, 2009, 2010, 2014, 2015, 2016, 2017, 2020, 2021, 2022, 2023, 2025
FA Cup	30, including 6 as double winners: 1921, 1922, 1927, 1930, 1935, 1958, 1961, 1962, 1974, 1983, 1984, 1989, 1994, 1995, 1996, 1998, 2000, 2001, 2002, 2006, 2009, 2014, 2015, 2016, 2017, 2019, 2020, 2021, 2022, 2025,	11, including 1 as double winner: 1949, 1954, 1960, 1964, 1965, 1967, 1977, 1981, 1986, 1990, 1991	46, including 3 as double winners: 1928, 1931, 1932, 1933, 1934, 1936, 1937, 1938, 1948, 1951, 1952, 1953, 1955, 1956, 1957, 1959, 1963, 1966, 1968, 1969, 1970, 1975, 1976, 1978, 1979, 1980, 1982, 1985, 1987, 1988, 1992, 1993, 1997, 1999, 2003, 2004, 2005, 2007, 2008, 2010, 2011, 2012, 2013, 2018, 2023, 2024, 2026
First Division/Premier League runners-up	3: 1999, 2010, 2023	1: 1986	5: 1994, 1996, 1998, 2002, 2019
First Division/Premier League other positions in brackets	1: 1972 (4th)	—	—
FA Cup runners-up	—	1: 1986	1: 1971
Defending champions of the Charity Shield	—	1: 1986	1: 1973
Champions of lower-tier leagues (tier in brackets)	2: 1971 (2), 1973 (2)	—	2: 1920 (2), 1972 (3)
Southern League	1: 1910	—	4: 1908, 1909, 1911, 1912
Professionals	4: 1913, 1923, 1924, 1929	—	2: 1925, 1926
Amateurs	2: 1925, 1926	—	4: 1913, 1923, 1924, 1929
Others	1: 1950	—	3: 1927, 1950, 1961

Notes

1. Leicester City, Liverpool, Manchester City, Aston Villa and Burnley were invited to take part in the Shield these years because either the First Division or FA Cup winners declined or were unable to participate. Other participants have been the runner-ups of the FA Cup or the defending champions of the Shield throughout the years, however they are listed in this table based on how they qualified for the Shield.
2. The FA invited Corinthians FC to take part as an amateur representative against FA Cup winners Cardiff City.
3. In matches between the First Division/Premier League champions and FA Cup winners, the First Division/Premier League champion won the Shield 42 times and the FA Cup winner 20 times, while it was shared 10 times.
4. Leicester City jointly held this record following their 1971 win, but eventually qualified through the traditional route following their league win in 2016.
