= Eden Hall, Singapore =

British High Commissioner's official residence in Singapore

Coordinates: 1.3104°N 103.8217°E

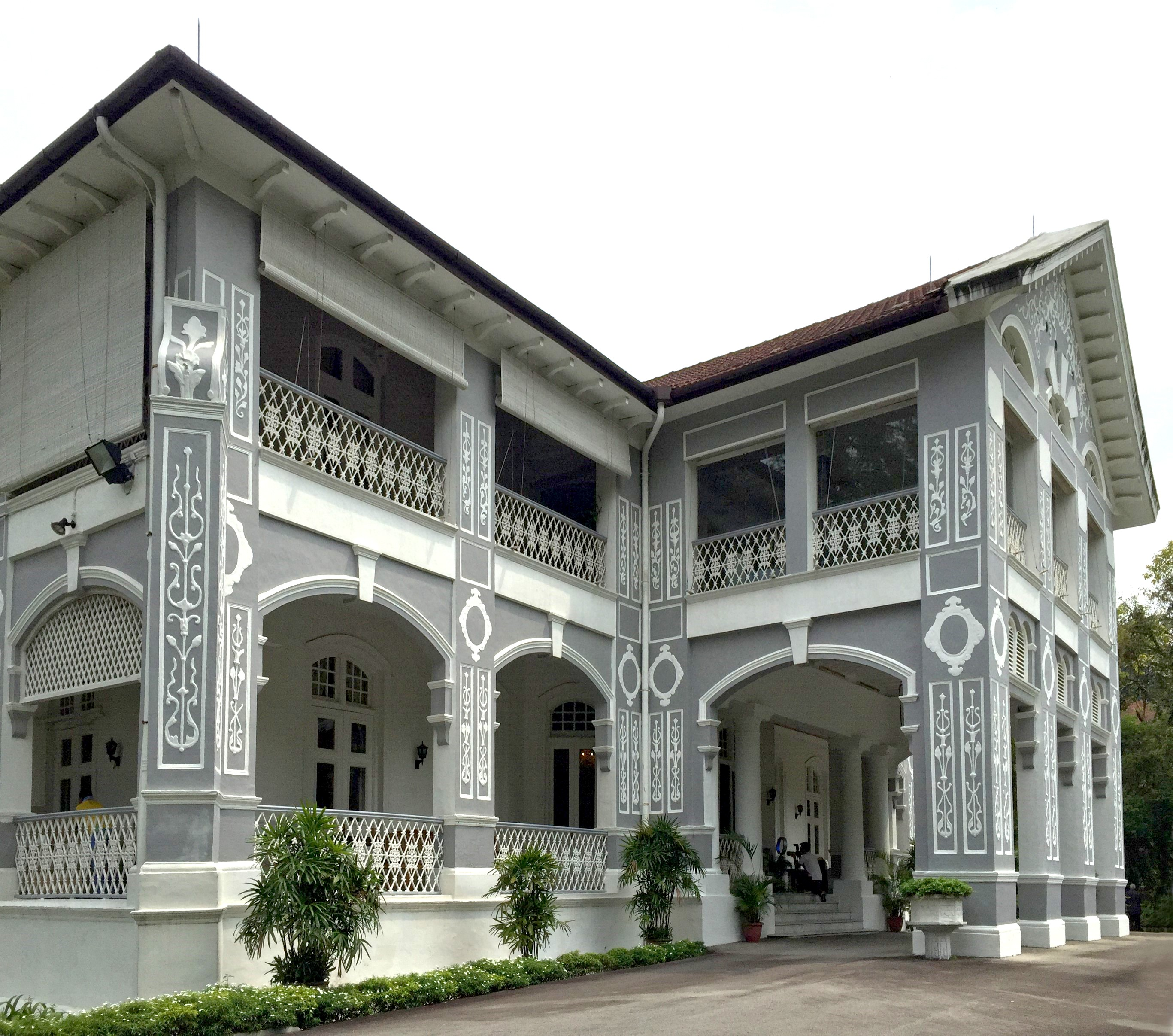
The northern facade of Eden Hall

Eden Hall is the official residence of the British High Commissioner to the Republic of Singapore. It is located on Nassim Road, Tanglin, Singapore.

It was built in 1904 for Ezekiel Saleh Manasseh, a Baghdadi Jewish merchant who sold rice and opium, and originally came from Calcutta. It was designed by the architect R. A. J. Bidwell, who also designed the Raffles Hotel and the Goodwood Park Hotel. The architect Leonard Manasseh, the nephew of Ezekiel Saleh Manasseh, was born there in 1916.

Ezekiel Manasseh died in the Changi Prison hospital in May 1944 during the Japanese occupation of Singapore, and in 1957, his stepson Vivian Bath retired to Australia and sold Eden House to the British government for the nominal sum of £56,000 and stipulated that there must be a plaque at the bottom of the flagpole: "May the Union Jack fly here forever". After Singapore's independence, the building was made the official residence of the British High Commissioner to the Republic of Singapore.
