= Pet Lovers Centre =

Asian retailer of pet products and services

- Industry: Pet Products, Pet Stores
- Genre: Pet Care Pet Supply Store
- Founded: Singapore; 1973; 53 years ago
- Founder: David F C Ng & Robert F L Ng
- Number of locations: 165 (67 in Singapore, 66 in Malaysia, 21 in Thailand, & 11 in Philippines)
- Area served: Singapore, Malaysia, Thailand, & Philippines
- Key people: Whye Hoe (Group MD) / David W T Ng (CEO, Executive Director) / W K Ng (CFO, Group Director)
- Products: Trustie, The Pet Safari & Burp!
- Website: Company Homepage

Pet Lovers Centre Pte Ltd (PLC) is an Asian retailer of pet products and services. It is one of the largest and oldest pet store chains in Singapore. Today, PLC has 69 stores in Singapore, 67 stores in Malaysia, 26 stores in Thailand, and 11 stores in Philippines.

In 1980, the firm launched its brand of pet accessories called Trustie, and in 1996, launched its food brand called Burp! PLC became a franchise-able brand in 2008. PLC publishes a pet magazine in Singapore, called Petlovers Magazine. In 2012, PLC organised a meet-and-greet event for pet lovers to meet celebrity Cesar Millan. In December 2012, the company launched a mobile app and mobile site. The app and mobile site included a chat function and GPS locations of each store.

Pet Lovers Centre Pte Ltd (PLC) was established in 1973 by two brothers, Robert Ng Fook Leon and David Ng Fook Choy. Their first retail store was set up at Shaw House and Centre on Scotts Road. In 1995, Robert Ng Fook Leon's youngest son, Ng Whye Hoe, took over the business together with his school friend when the company ran into financial difficulties.

== Philanthropy ==
Through the Pet Lovers Foundation, a non-profit organization established by PLC, animal welfare organizations such as Save Our Street Dogs receive support from the sale of Petlovers Magazine.
