= North Westminster Community School =

Defunct school in London, England

Information
- School type: Comprehensive school
- Established: 1981
- Closed: 2006

North Westminster Community School was a comprehensive school in London, England, formed in 1980 by the amalgamation of Rutherford School, Sarah Siddons Girls' School, and Paddington School.

It closed in 2006 and was replaced by three new schools: Paddington Academy, Westminster Academy and King Solomon Academy.

The site was based on Penfold Street, London, NW1 6RX, which is now the home of King Solomon Academy.

== Collections ==
The Institute of Education, University College London holds the personal archive of Michael Marland, the Headteacher of North Westminster Community School between 1980 - 1999. The archive was donated to the Institute by Marland's family in 2011, following his death in 2008. The collection contains papers relating to his time at North Westminster Community School, biographical information, and material relating to his policy work and arts advocacy.
