= Royal Garden Hotel =

Hotel in Kensington, London

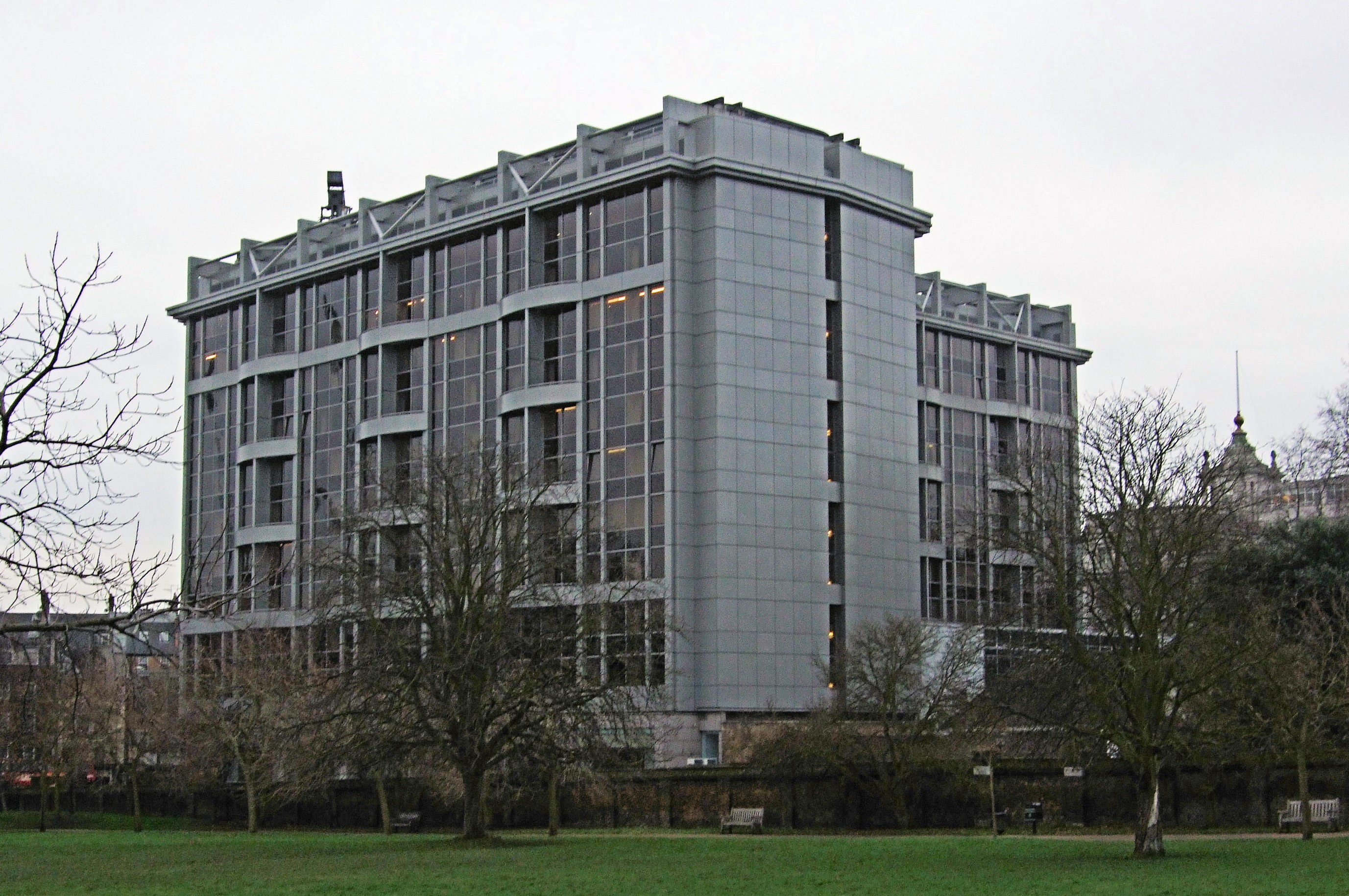
- Hotel exterior

- Location within Central London

General information
- Location: London, UK
- Coordinates: 51°30′9.54″N 0°11′16.91″W

Technical details
- Floor count: 10

Other information
- Number of rooms: 396
- Number of suites: 17
- Parking: 147 Spaces

Website
- www.royalgardenhotel.co.uk

Royal Garden Hotel is a 5-star luxury hotel in London, England, located in the borough of Kensington. Located on Kensington High Street, the hotel houses 396 guest rooms and suites, a renowned Chinese restaurant Min Jiang, a modern British restaurant Origin Kensington with 2 AA rosette accolades, Piano Kensington, a cocktail bar with live piano performances, as well as 11 meetings and event spaces.

== History ==
=== The Royal Palace Hotel ===
The hotel was preceded by the former Royal Palace Hotel, a Victorian-era hotel completed in 1893 designed by British architect, Basil Champneys. As part of the war effort in the 1900s, The Royal Palace was taken over and used as the headquarters for the Woman's Royal Voluntary Service.

=== Demolition and rebuilding ===
In the 1961, as part of a Labour Government grant, the Queen Anne-style building was demolished and completely rebuilt in a Brutalist-style under the guide of architect, Colonel Richard Seifert. The hotel re-opened in 1965 as the Royal Garden Hotel, operated by the Oddeninos hotel company.

=== Sporting events ===
Royal Garden Hotel has been associated with several sporting events. In 1966, it was the venue for the draw for the FIFA World Cup and subsequently hosted the celebration following England's World Cup victory. In 1991, it served as the base for the Japanese sumo delegation during the first overseas sumo tournament, staged at the Royal Albert Hall. In 2025, the hotel hosted the sumo wrestlers again when the overseas Grand Sumo Tournament returned to London for the second time.

=== Later history ===
In 1994, the hotel was bought by the Singaporean entrepreneur, Tan Sri Khoo Teck Puat, and undertook a £30 million refurbishment. It reopened in April 1996 under the management of Khoo's Goodwood Group, joining the group's two Singapore hotels, the Goodwood Park Hotel and the York Hotel.

In May 2011, the hotel completed the final stage of an extensive £45 million refurbishment.

The hotel closed temporarily in 2020 and reopened in 2022 with refurbished guestrooms and restaurant.
