= Westminster Academy, London =

Coordinates: 51°31′16″N 0°11′34″W

Westminster Academy

Location
- The Naim Dangoor Centre; 255 Harrow Road; Westminster, London, W2 5EZ; England

Information
- Type: Academy
- Established: 2006
- Department for Education URN: 131262 Tables
- Ofsted: Reports
- Principal: Numera Anwar
- Gender: Coeducational
- Age: 11 to 18
- Enrolment: 1056
- Sponsor: Exilarch's Foundation
- Website: http://www.westminsteracademy.org.uk/

Westminster Academy is an Academy (publicly funded, semi-independent secondary school) and IB World School located in London, England. It is a co-educational school for pupils of 11+ years, and specialises in International Business and Enterprise. The school was created, along with nearby Paddington Academy, following the closure of North Westminster Community School.

== History ==
Westminster Academy opened in September 2006 in temporary accommodation at Penfold Street in the London borough of the City of Westminster. This building was formerly the Marylebone Lower School site of North Westminster Community School. The school moved into new purpose-built premises in the summer of 2007. The new site is in the Westbourne Green area. The architects are Allford Hall Monaghan Morris.

== Admissions ==
Westminster Academy is a comprehensive school which does not select pupils for admission. Admissions are administered by Westminster City Council through the Pan London Coordinated Admission System.

Westminster Academy offers International Baccalaureate programmes at Sixth form: the International Baccalaureate Diploma Programme (IBDP) and the International Baccalaureate Career-related Programme (IBCP).

== Notable alumni ==
- Khaleeda Bustamam, Crown Princess of Johor
- Iliman Ndiaye, Professional Football Player of Manchester City

== See also ==
- List of schools in the City of Westminster
