= List of schools in the City of Westminster =

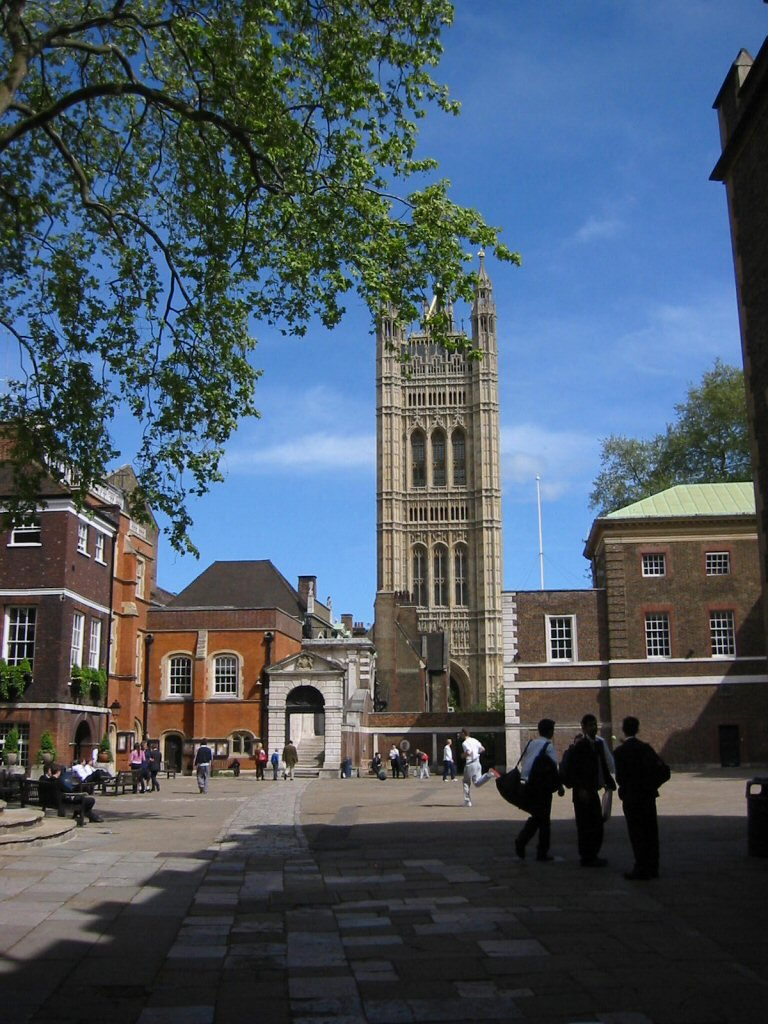
Little Dean's Yard from Liddell's Arch at Westminster School

This is a list of schools in the City of Westminster in London.

Westminster Children's Services administers many primary and secondary schools. In addition there are several Church of England (CE), Roman Catholic (RC), and Christian non-denominational (ND) schools in the city.

There are also many non-profit-making independent schools, funded by a combination of tuition fees, long-term endowments, gifts and sometimes small commercial ventures directly connected to a school's educational activities. Please see the lists of Junior and Senior independent schools after those of the state-funded schools:

== State-funded schools ==
=== Primary schools ===
- All Souls CE Primary School
- Ark Atwood Primary Academy
- Ark King Solomon Academy
- Barrow Hill Junior School
- Burdett Coutts and Townsland CE Primary School
- Christ Church Bentinck CE Primary School
- Churchill Gardens Primary Academy
- Edward Wilson Primary School
- Essendine Primary School
- Gateway Academy
- George Eliot Primary School
- Hallfield Primary School
- Hampden Gurney Primary School
- Millbank Academy
- The Minerva Academy
- Our Lady Of Dolours RC Primary School
- Paddington Green Primary School
- Pimlico Primary
- Queen's Park Primary School
- Robinsfield Infant School
- St Augustine's CE Primary School
- St Barnabas CE Primary School
- St Clement Danes CE Primary School
- St Edward's RC Primary School
- St Gabriel's CE Primary School
- St George's Hanover Square CE Primary School
- St James and St John CE Primary School
- St Joseph's RC Primary School
- St Luke's CE Primary School
- St Mary Magdalene CE Primary School
- St Mary of the Angels RC Primary School
- St Mary's Bryanston Square CE Primary School
- St Matthew's CE School
- St Peter's CE School
- St Peter's Eaton Square CE Primary School
- St Saviour's CE Primary School
- St Stephen's CE Primary School
- St Vincent De Paul RC Primary School
- St Vincent's RC Primary School
- Soho Parish CE Primary School
- Wilberforce Primary School

=== Secondary schools ===
- Ark King Solomon Academy
- Grey Coat Hospital
- Harris Academy St John's Wood
- Marylebone Academy
- Paddington Academy
- Pimlico Academy
- St Augustine's Church of England High School
- St George's Catholic School
- St Marylebone School
- Westminster Academy
- Westminster City School

=== Special and alternative schools ===
- College Park School
- Ormiston Beachcroft Academy
- Queen Elizabeth II Jubilee School
- The St Marylebone Church of England Bridge School

=== Further education ===
- City of Westminster College
- Fashion Retail Academy
- Harris Westminster Sixth Form
- Westminster Kingsway College

== Independent schools ==
=== Primary and preparatory schools ===
- Arnold House School (boys' prep school)
- Connaught House School (co-educational prep school)
- Eaton House Belgravia School (boys' prep school)
- L'Ecole Bilingue Elementaire (co-educational prep school)
- Naima Jewish Preparatory School (Jewish, co-educational prep school)
- Prince's Gardens Preparatory School (co-educational prep school)
- St Christina's Prep School (co-educational prep school)
- St Nicholas Preparatory School (co-educational prep school)
- Westminster Abbey Choir School (CE, boy choristers only, boarding prep school)
- Westminster Cathedral Choir School (Catholic, boys' prep school)
- Westminster Under School (boys' prep school)

=== Senior and all-through schools ===
- The American School in London (co-educational international school, K-12)
- Bales College (co-educational day and boarding)
- Eaton Square School (co-educational day school)
- EIFA International School London (co-educational all-through school)
- Francis Holland School, Regent's Park campus (CE, girls)
- Halcyon London International School (co-educational international school)
- International Community School (co-educational international school)
- Kensington Park School (co-educational day and boarding)
- Maida Vale School (selective co-ed)
- Portland Place School (selective co-ed)
- Queen's College, London (ND, selective girls)
- Royal Ballet School (selective co-ed)
- Southbank International School (ND, selective co-ed)
- Sylvia Young Theatre School
- Westminster School (CE, selective boys, co-ed sixth form, day and boarding)
- Wetherby School (boys' selective)

=== Special and alternative schools ===
- Abingdon House School
- Fairley House School
