= Tanglin =

Planning area in Central Region, Singapore

- Planning Area

Other transcription(s)
  - Chinese: 东陵 (Simplified) 東陵 (Traditional); Dōnglíng (Pinyin); Tang-lêng (Teochew PUJ); Tang-lêng (Hokkien POJ)
  - Malay: Tanglin
  - Tamil: தங்லின் Taṅliṉ (Transliteration)
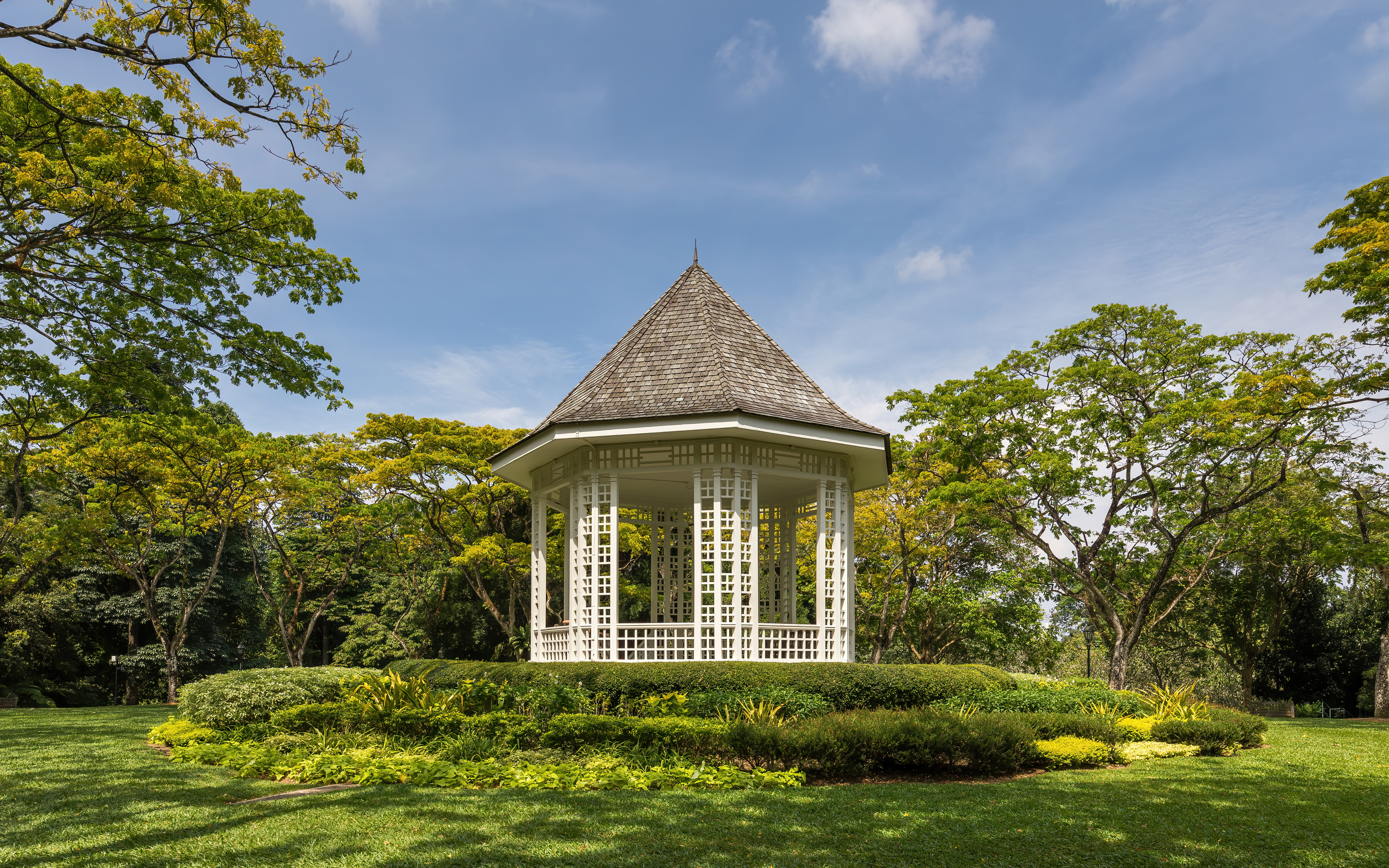
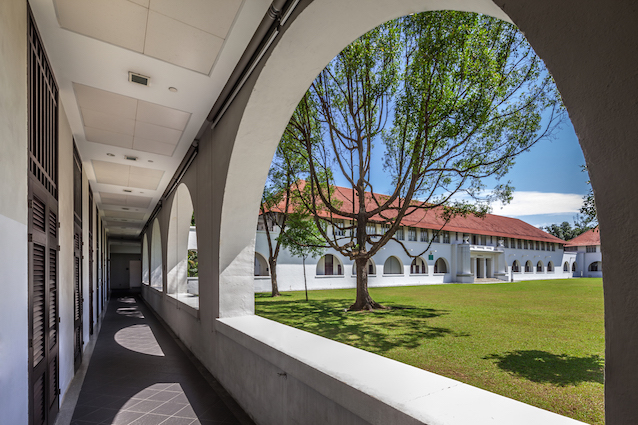
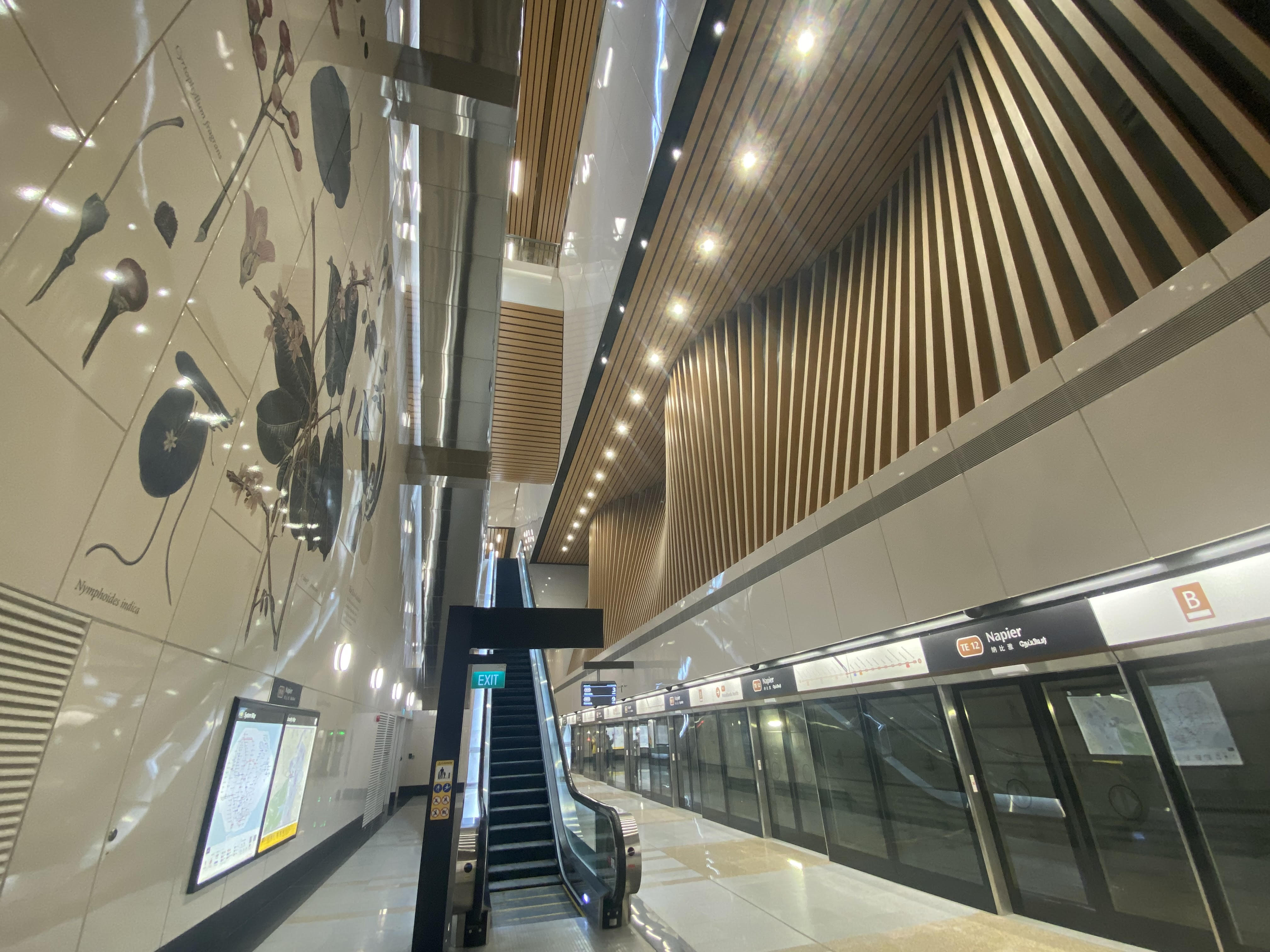
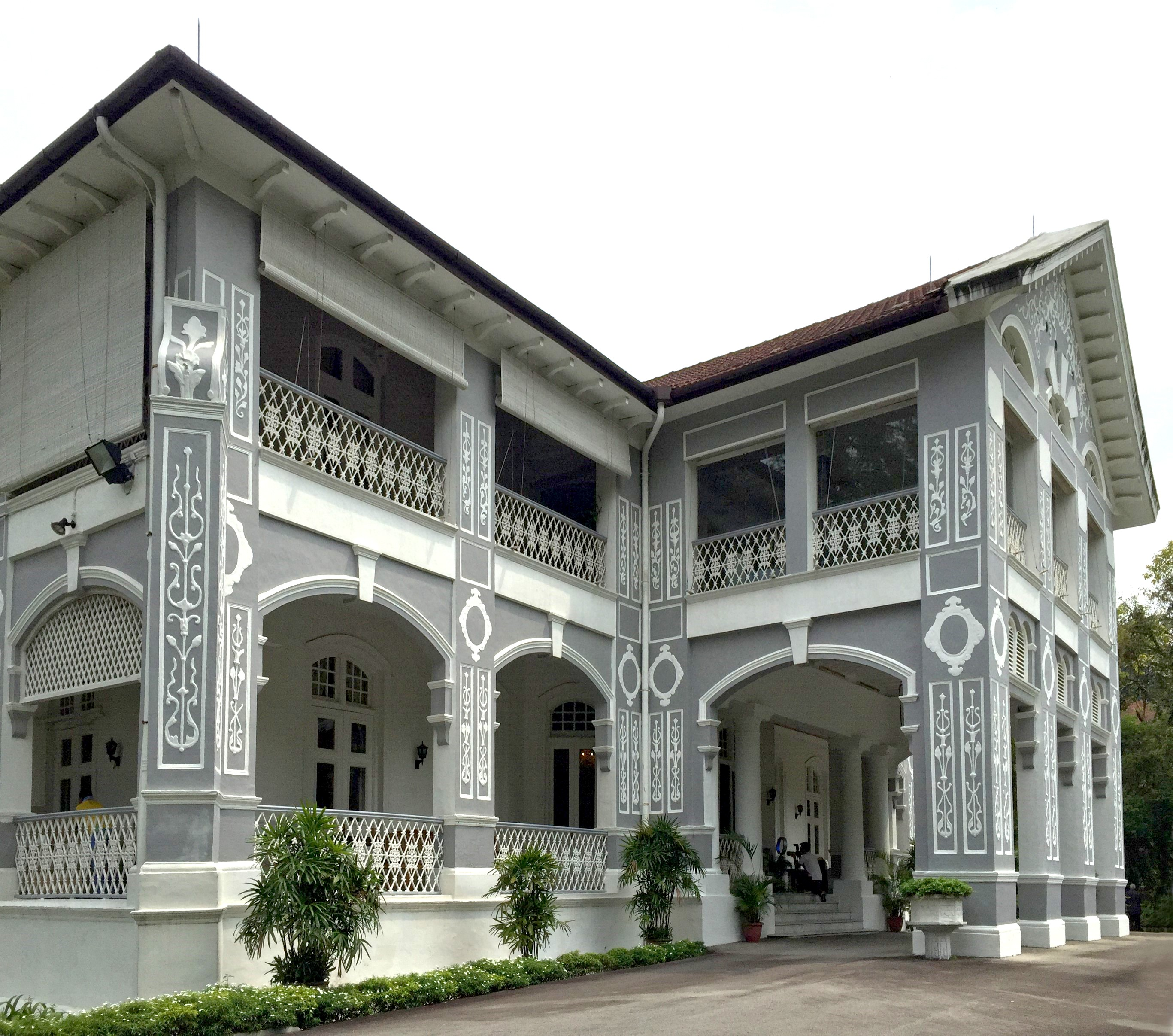
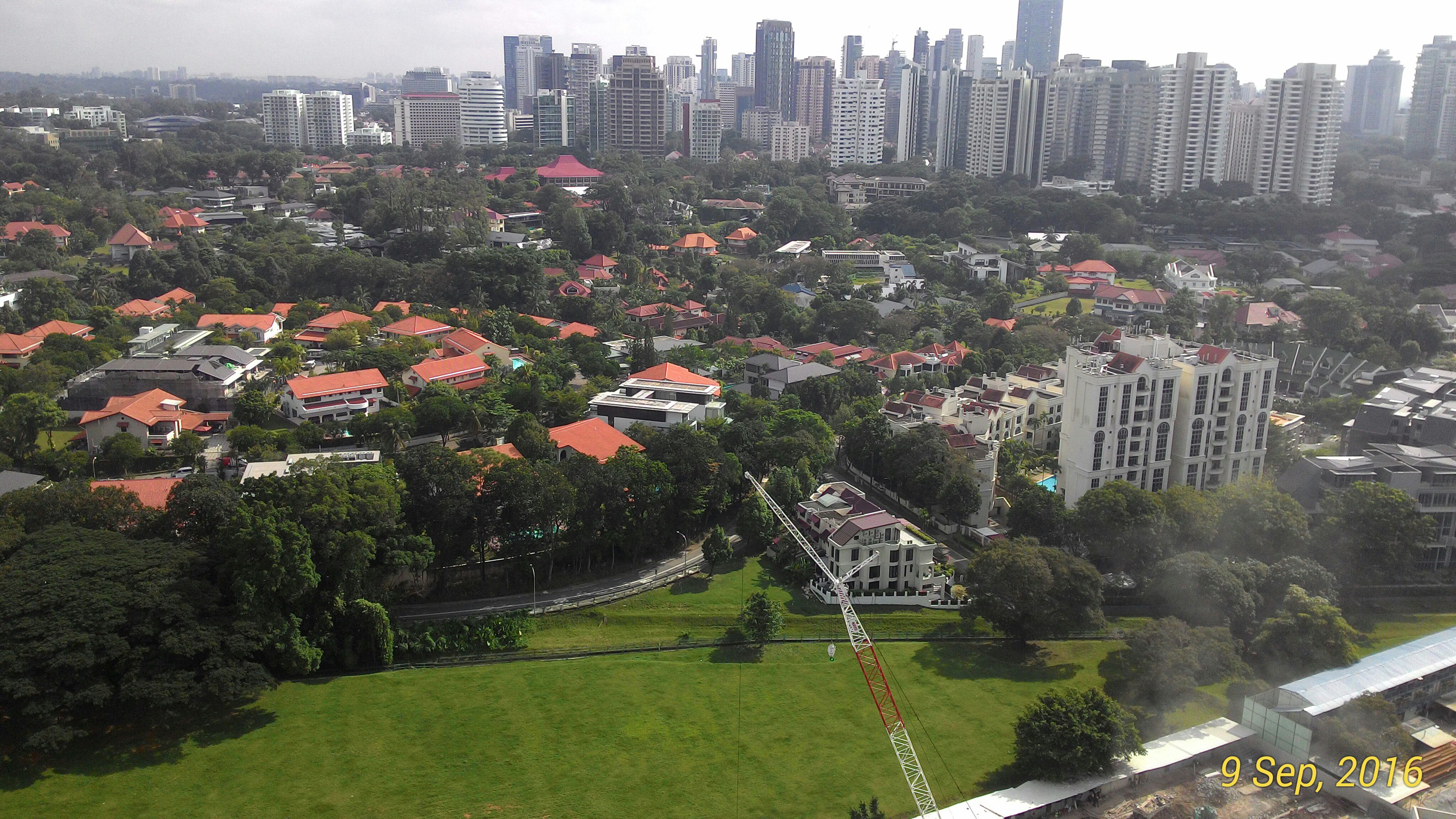
- From top left to right: Bandstand at Singapore Botanic Gardens, National University of Singapore Faculty of Law campus, Napier MRT station, Eden Hall, aerial view of Tanglin

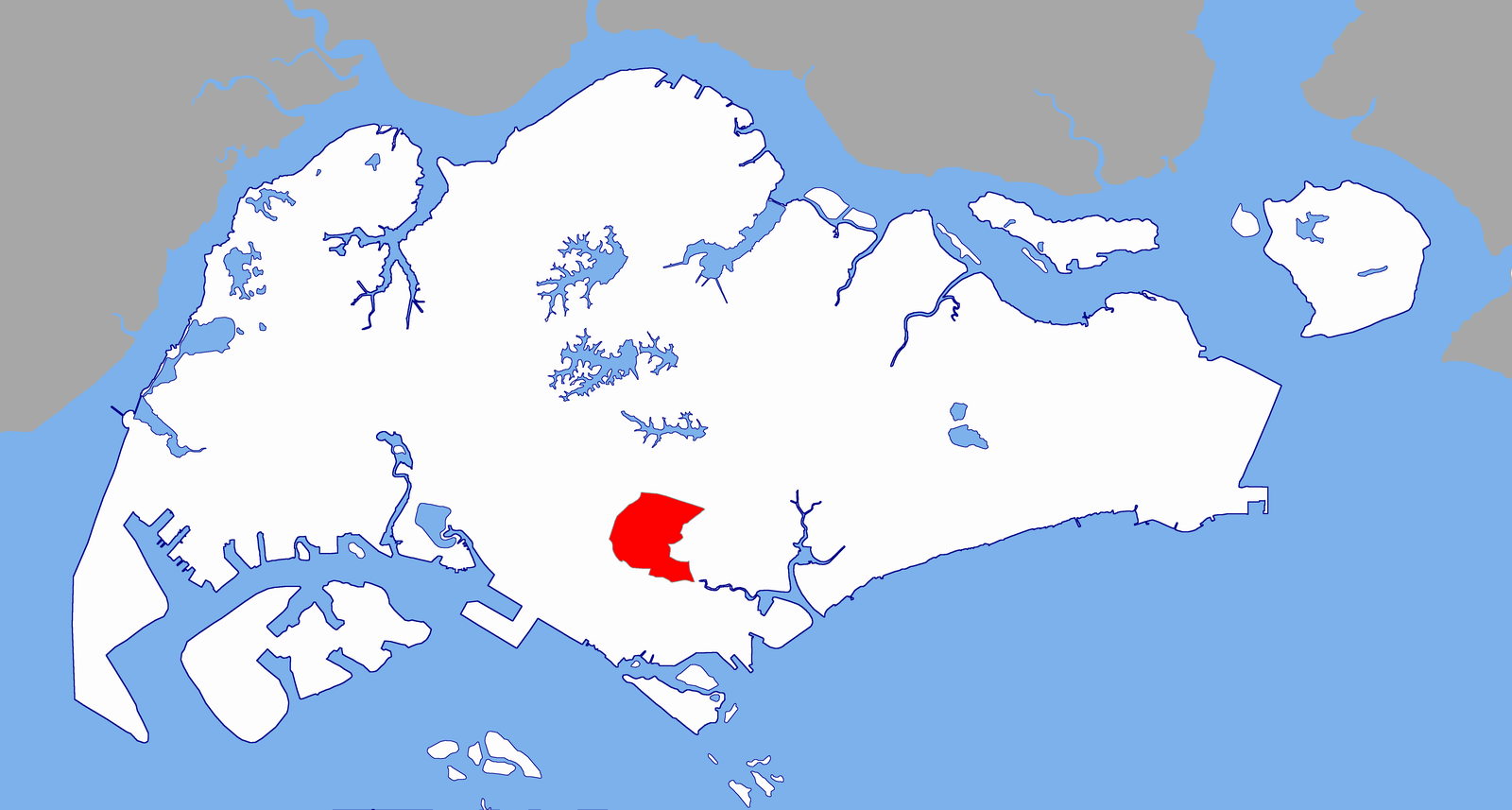

- Location of Tanglin in Central Region

- Location within Singapore
- Country: Singapore
- Region: Central Region
- CDCs: Central Singapore CDC
- Town councils: Tanjong Pagar Town Council
- Constituencies: Tanjong Pagar GRC

Government
  - Mayors: Central Singapore CDC: Denise Phua
  - Members of Parliament: Tanjong Pagar GRC: Alvin Tan; Joan Pereira

Area
  - Total: 7.55 km^{2} (2.92 sq mi)

Population (2026)
  - Total: 25,190
  - Rank: 28th
  - Density: 3,340/km^{2} (8,640/sq mi)
  - Rank: 33rd

Ethnic groups (2020)
  - Chinese: 16,270
  - Malays: 240
  - Indians: 2,200
  - Others: 3,090

Tanglin (Note: Locally, /ˈtʌŋlɪn/ TUNG-lin, /ˈtæŋ-/ TANG-lin or /ˈtʌŋleɪŋ/ TUNG-layng. The pronunciation /ˈtʌŋleɪŋ/ is an approximation of the Hokkien [taŋ⁴⁴⁻²² leŋ²⁴] or Teochew pronunciation [taŋ³³ leŋ⁵⁵] of the area. The variant /ˈtæŋlɪn/, which more accurately reflects the anglicisation of the district name, is less common than the other two.) is a planning area located within the Central Region of Singapore. Tanglin is located west of Newton, Orchard, River Valley and Singapore River, south of Novena, east of Bukit Timah, northeast of Queenstown and north of Bukit Merah.

== Etymology and history ==
The name Tanglin is believed to be an anglicisation of Tang Leng, which was the Chinese name of the Scottish lawyer and newspaper editor William Napier's house that was located in the area. Tang Leng was said to be named after the area's Chinese name in Teochew dialect, 'Twa Tang Leng', which translates to 'great east hill peaks' in reference to the hills surrounding the area.

In November 2006, the Singapore Land Authority (SLA) launched new tenders to redevelop the Dempsey Road area as an interim commercial lifestyle precinct, branded as Tanglin Village. The site occupies the former Tanglin Barracks, which housed the Ministry of Defence and the Central Manpower Base from 1972 until 1989. The colonial-era barracks buildings were conserved and adapted for commercial use, housing restaurants, art galleries, and antique retailers across the Dempsey, Minden, and Loewen clusters.

== Geography ==
Tanglin planning area is bounded by Bukit Timah Road to the north, Farrer Road and Queensway to the west, Ridout Road, Kay Siang Road, Prince Charles Crescent, and Alexandra Canal to the south as well as Zion Road, Grange Road, Tanglin Road, Orange Grove Road, and Balmoral Road to the east.

There are four subzones within the planning area, Chatsworth, Nassim, Ridout and Tyersall.

== Infrastructure ==
=== Transportation ===
Major roads in Tanglin include Napier Road and Holland Road, which are arterial roads that link the Orchard Road district to Bukit Timah and Queenstown. The namesake Tanglin Road link Chatsworth, Queenstown and Bukit Merah to Napier and Orchard. Along its northern and northwestern boundaries, major roads that link Tanglin to adjacent planning areas include Bukit Timah Road, Dunearn Road and Farrer Road.

Mass Rapid Transit rail connections include Farrer Road MRT station of the Circle line, Botanic Gardens MRT station, which is an interchange station between the Circle and Downtown line, as well as Stevens MRT station which is an interchange station between Downtown line and the Thomson–East Coast line. Other TEL stations include Napier, which is located at the foot of the Singapore Botanic Gardens and Orchard Boulevard, which is located at the border between Orchard and Tanglin planning areas.

=== Tourist attractions ===
Tanglin is home to the Singapore Botanic Gardens, a UNESCO World Heritage Site which was established in 1859. It is the oldest garden in Singapore and it is located near the Orchard Road shopping belt. The Botanic Gardens can be accessed via two main entrances: Bukit Timah Gate at the northern end and Tanglin Gate at the southern end.

Other notable attractions include Dempsey Hill, a former British military barracks that has been redeveloped into a dining and lifestyle hub, featuring upscale restaurants, boutique shops, and galleries. Additionally, the Museum of Ice Cream (MOIC), which opened in 2021, is located at Loewen Road.

=== Embassies and international organisations ===
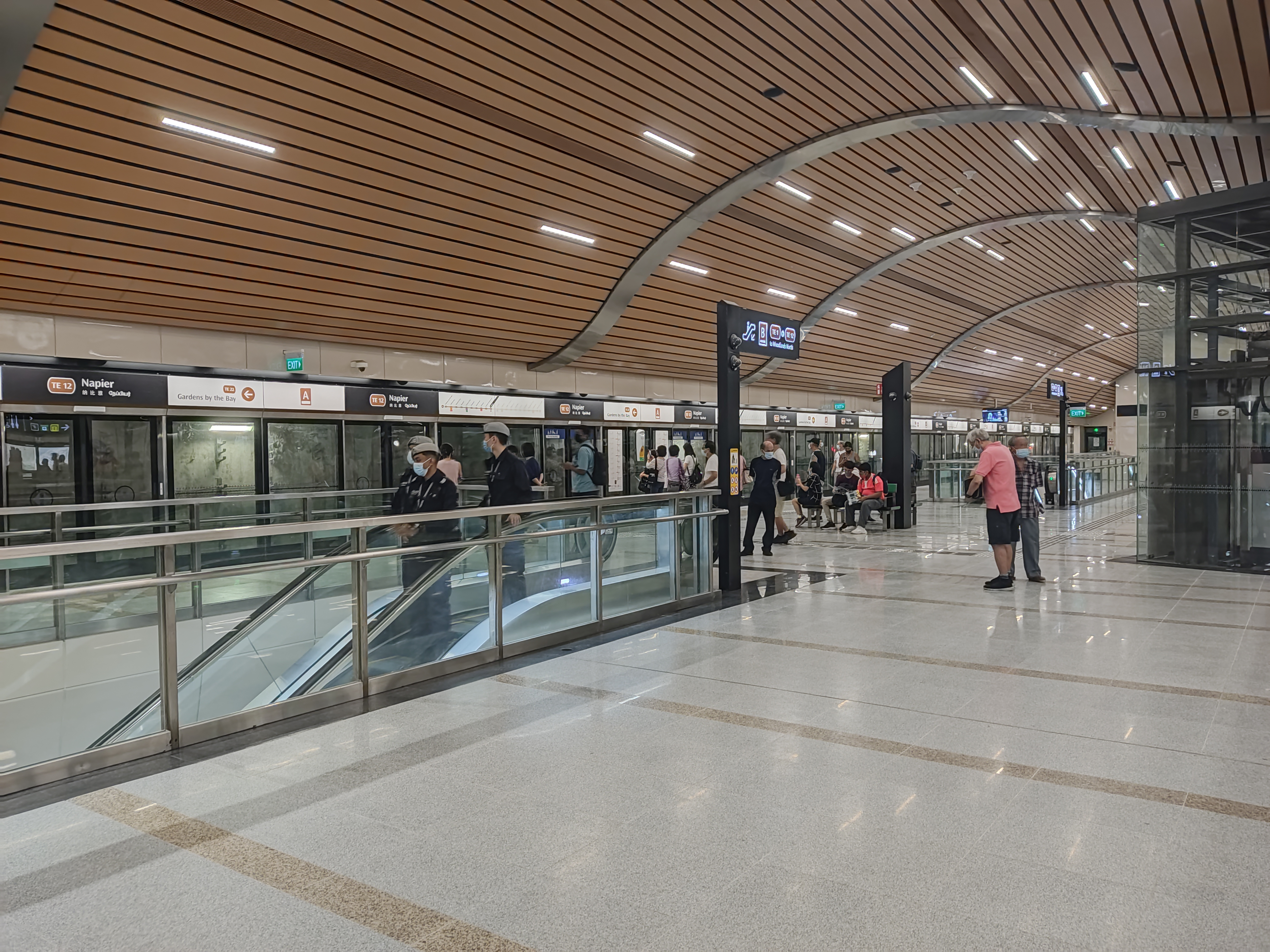
Napier MRT station of the Thomson–East Coast line

Tanglin is home to several embassies and high commissions. The embassies of Australia, Brunei, France, Indonesia, Israel, Japan, Malaysia, Myanmar, People's Republic of China, Russia, The Philippines, the United States and the United Kingdom are located in Tanglin. Tanglin also houses the headquarters of the Ministry of Foreign Affairs (MFA), Interpol's Singapore's office, and the British Council, which provides English language educational and cultural exchange programs. The official residence of the British High Commissioner, Eden Hall, is also located in Tanglin.

== Education ==
Tanglin is home to several notable educational institutions. The Bukit Timah campus of the National University of Singapore (NUS) houses the Faculty of Law, Singapore's oldest law school, and the autonomous Lee Kuan Yew School of Public Policy. Located near the Singapore Botanic Gardens. Crescent Girls' School is the only government secondary school located in Tanglin.

Additionally, Tanglin has several international schools catering to the expatriate community, including:

- Astor International School
- EtonHouse International School Orchard
- Invictus International School (Dempsey Campus)
- Melbourne International School
- Wise Oaks International School

== Amenities ==
=== Healthcare ===
The main healthcare facility in Tanglin area is the Gleneagles Hospital, a private hospital located along Napier Road, next to Napier MRT station.

=== Commercial ===
Being in close proximity to the Orchard Road shopping belt, there are several shopping malls nearby such as Tanglin Mall, Tanglin Place, and Tudor Court which are located at Tanglin Road at the boundary between Orchard and Tanglin planning areas. Other shopping facilities include Cluny Court and Serene Centre, which are located at the northwestern tip of Tanglin.

=== Food ===
- Zion Riverside Food Centre

== Notable places ==
=== Former ===
- Tanglin Circus Fountain, former water fountain built in the Tanglin Circus roundabout in front of the Omni Marco Polo Hotel in Tanglin.

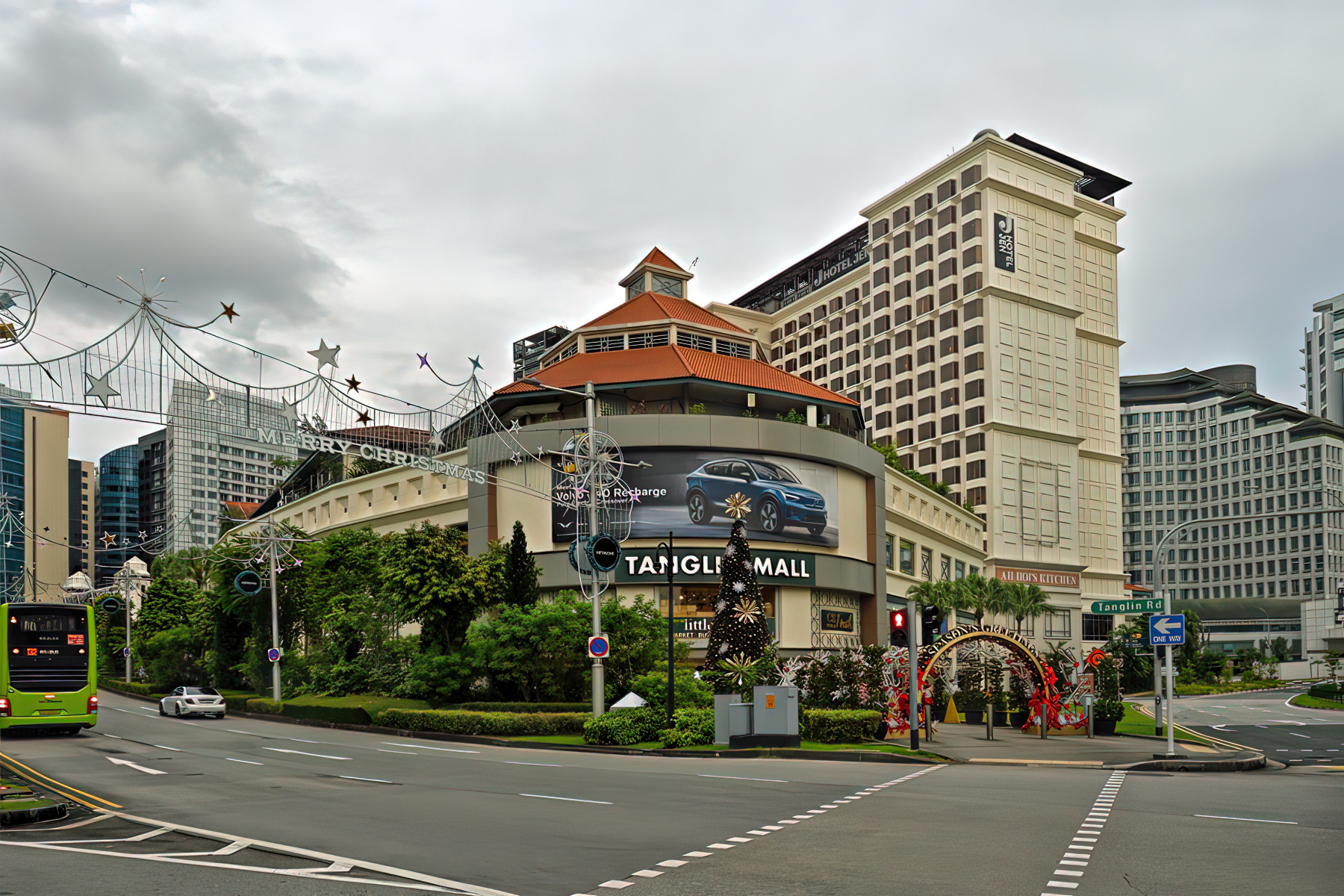
Tanglin Mall on Tanglin Road.

== Housing ==
Tanglin is one of the few residential districts in Singapore with very few Housing and Development Board (HDB) flats. Due to its prime location and high land value, the area primarily consists of private properties, including Good Class Bungalows (GCBs) and high-rise condominiums. Similar to Bukit Timah, Tanglin is home to many affluent residents and expatriates.

Notable Tanglin residents include Eduardo Saverin, co-founder of Facebook, who reportedly resides on Nassim Road, and billionaire restaurateur Zhang Yong, who owns a GCB on Gallop Road.

== Notes and references ==
=== Sources ===
- Victor R Savage, Brenda S A Yeoh (2003), Toponymics - A Study of Singapore Street Names, Eastern Universities Press, ISBN 981-210-205-1
