= Paddington Academy =

Coordinates: 51°31′31″N 0°11′31″W

Location
- 50 Marylands Road; London, W9 2DR; England

Information
- Type: Academy
- Motto: The best in everyone
- Established: 1 September 2006
- Local authority: City of Westminster
- Specialists: Media and Performing Arts; Business and Enterprise
- Department for Education URN: 130912 Tables
- Ofsted: Reports
- Principals: Katie Gillam and Peter Jones
- Gender: Mixed
- Age: 11 to 18
- Enrolment: 1235
- Colours: Navy, Blue & White
- Website: https://www.paddington-academy.org/

Paddington Academy is a non-selective co-educational secondary school and academy located in Maida Vale in the borough of Westminster and the ceremonial county of London, England. Established in September 2006, it is run by United Learning, formerly known as United Church Schools Trust. It was officially opened by The Princess Royal on 19 March 2009 at 9 am.

== History ==
Paddington Academy opened in September 2006 as one of two new academies (along with Westminster Academy) established to replace North Westminster Community School. The initial plan was moving school to an older building located on North Wharf Road for its first term and then moving into a new building located on Maryland's Road. However, work on the new building was delayed multiple times, forcing the school to stay at North Wharf Road for a year before finally moving to the new and current site in April 2007.

== Academics ==
=== Ofsted judgements ===
In the academy's first Ofsted report in 2007, it was described as "an academy that rightly judges that standards remain low and that achievement is inadequate."

The academy's second Ofsted report and first full inspection in 2009 showed that while there was an improvement in the grades of students, there was a lack of consistency within the subjects. However, overall the school was described as "[an] academy which provides a satisfactory quality of education."

In November 2011, the academy was judged as Outstanding by Ofsted.

=== GCSE results ===
In 2007, GCSE results showed that only 25% of students managed to get 5 or more A*–C grades including English and Maths. The following year, that figure increased to 41%. Then in 2009, it fell to 34%. However, in 2010 the number of students achieving 5 or more A*–C GCSE grades including English and Maths jumped to 62% and in total, 94% of students managed to achieve 5 or more A*–C grades, up from 86% the year before. As of 2011, the results show that figure has managed to rise again to 68% with a total of 99% of students managing to achieve 5 or more A*–C GCSEs, a 5% increase from the prior year.

In 2010, Paddington Academy became the second most improved academy in England, was ranked the 5th best school in the country and was ranked 2nd for the most student progress. As of 2011, it received the 3rd highest number of students receiving 5 or more A*-C GCSEs in Westminster and was ranked the 4th best school in England.

In August 2018 at GCSE level 80% of students at the academy gained at least a grade 4 in English and Maths. In addition, 60 of the grades gained by students were grade 9s, which is the highest attainable grade at GCSE and was achieved by only 3% of students nationally.

At A Level, 32% of grades were awarded the highest marks of A* or A, 66% of A Level grades were awarded A*-B; 90% of grades were awarded A*-C and ten students gained at least 3+ A grades at A Level (7% of the cohort).

The school achieved a Progress 8 score of 0.94 in October 2019 which placed the academy in the top 1% of schools nationally.

== See also ==
- List of schools in the City of Westminster
