= Rutherford School, Paddington =

Former school in Paddington, London, England

Coordinates: 51.5219°N 0.1688°W

Rutherford School was a secondary modern school, later comprehensive school, in Paddington, London, England. It opened in 1960 and in 1981 amalgamated with Sarah Siddons Girls' School and Paddington School to form the North Westminster Community School. The site is now occupied by the Ark King Solomon Academy.

It was built from 1958 to 1960, designed by the architects Leonard Manasseh and Ian Baker, and is a Grade II* listed building.

== Notable former pupils and staff ==
- Gary Crowley, DJ
- Phil Daniels, actor
- Danny John-Jules, actor

== Staff ==
- Bob Wilson, footballer
