= Ian Baker (architect) =

British architect (1923–2010)

Ian Crampton Baker
- Born: 23 May 1923; Westcliffe-on-Sea, England
- Died: 11 May 2010 (aged 86)
- Education: Mill Hill School; Aberystwyth University; Architectural Association School of Architecture
- Occupation: Architect

Ian Crampton Baker (23 May 1923 – 11 May 2010) was a British architect, best known for Rutherford School, Paddington, and the National Motor Museum, Beaulieu, both of which he co-designed with Leonard Manasseh. He was born in Westcliffe-on-Sea and was educated at Mill Hill School, Aberystwyth University, and Architectural Association School of Architecture.
