= Karen Willinger =

British textile designer

Karen Willinger (born Karin Williger or Weiss, 1919–2008), was a British textile designer.

She was born on 27 March 1919.

Her design Enara, made in cotton for Edinburgh Weavers of Carlisle, England, is in the permanent collection of London's Victoria & Albert Museum.

In 1947, she married the architect Leonard Manasseh (1916–2017), and the records show her names as "Gusti Williger" or "Gusti Weiss".

In April 1948, their son Alan Sylvanus Pelham Manasseh was born in London, and her birth surname is given as Weiss. In 1950, the birth of their son, Zachery Charles Manasseh was registered in Hertfordshire, England, and her birth surname is given as Weiss.

In July 1952 they moved to Singapore, but in 1953 or soon after, she left him and their two sons.

In 1956, as Karin Manasseh, she married George H Gretton in Hampstead, London. Ms Karin Gretton died in London, England on 17 April 2008.
