= Tanglin Circus Fountain =

General information
- Status: Demolished
- Location: Tanglin, Singapore
- Coordinates: 1.3051°N 103.8228°E
- Completed: September 1966; 60 years ago
- Demolished: January 1977; 49 years ago
- Cost: S$98,000

Tanglin Circus Fountain was a water fountain built in the centre of the Tanglin Circus roundabout. The roundabout was located in front of the Omni Marco Polo Hotel in Tanglin, Singapore, at the intersections of Napier Road, Tanglin Road and Grange Road. The fountain and the circus was demolished in 1977.

== History ==
Plans for a fountain to be built in Tanglin Circus was first announced in October 1965, and the fountain was completed in September 1966. The fountain cost $98,000 to build, being 160 ft long with a 50 ft diameter bowl, with the water in the fountain cascading into a 60 ft diameter pool below. The fountain was the third of several fountains commissioned by Minister of Cultural and Social Affairs Othman Wok, and was constructed by Siemens.

However, by the late 1970s, the traffic circle had been the cause of frequent traffic jams around the area. A decision was made by the government to demolish Tanglin Circus, along with the fountain. Both the circus and the fountain began being demolished in January 1977.
