= Zion Riverside Food Centre =

Hawker centre in Tanglin, Singapore

- 锡安路河畔熟食中心 (Chinese); Pusat Makanan Zion Riverside (Malay) சீயோன் ஆற்றங்கரை உணவு மையம் (Tamil)
- Former names: Zion Road Food Centre (1976–2003)

General information
- Location: Tanglin, Singapore, 70 Zion Road; 247792
- Coordinates: 1°17′32″N 103°49′52″E
- Opened: 1 October 1976; 50 years ago
- Renovated: 1 April 2003; 23 years ago
- Cost: S$289,000
- Landlord: National Environment Agency

Technical details
- Floor area: 1,421.31 m^{2} (15,298.9 sq ft)

Renovating team
- Architect: ADDP Architects

Other information
- Number of stores: 32
- Public transit: TE15 Great World

Zion Riverside Food Centre is a hawker centre in Tanglin, at the intersection Zion Road and Alexandra Canal.

Popular dishes at the hawker centre include char kway teow, Singaporean hae mee, and Hainanese chicken rice.

== History ==
=== Zion Road Food Centre (1976–2003) ===
Construction began in early 1976 at a cost of S$289,000. After about six months of construction, Zion Road Food Centre opened on 1 October 1976, housing 34 stalls. Most of the hawkers that moved in previously sold along the river near Great World Amusement Park.

Announced on 19 September 1989, the Ministry of Environment chose Zion Road Food Centre as one of the first five hawker centres to be equipped with self-flushing urinals to keep public toilets clean. Other appliances such as hand dryers and soap dispensers were also installed. The new systems were installed in 1990.

On 16 February 1990, Soh Siong Yang, a 10-year-old student from Delta Primary School, drowned in the canal beside the hawker centre. After purchasing beer and stout from the hawker centre, Soh proceeded to consume the drinks with his friends. Upon seeing some crabs crawling along the canal, Soh and his friends attempted to catch them by climbing down into the canal. However, the bank was slippery and the waves swept Soh into the canal, causing him to drown. Soh was rushed to Singapore General Hospital, but he was already dead upon arrival. The hawker who sold the beer and stout to the boys was also investigated by the police. During the coroner's inquest, it was identified that Soh was unable to swim, and the verdict was misadventure.

After the incident, there were calls for stiffer action and harsher penalties to those who sell alcohol illegally to minors. The Straits Times conducted a test to see how easy it was to purchase alcohol as a minor, and during the test at different hawker centres and coffeeshops, five out of eight stalls sold beer to an underage primary school student.

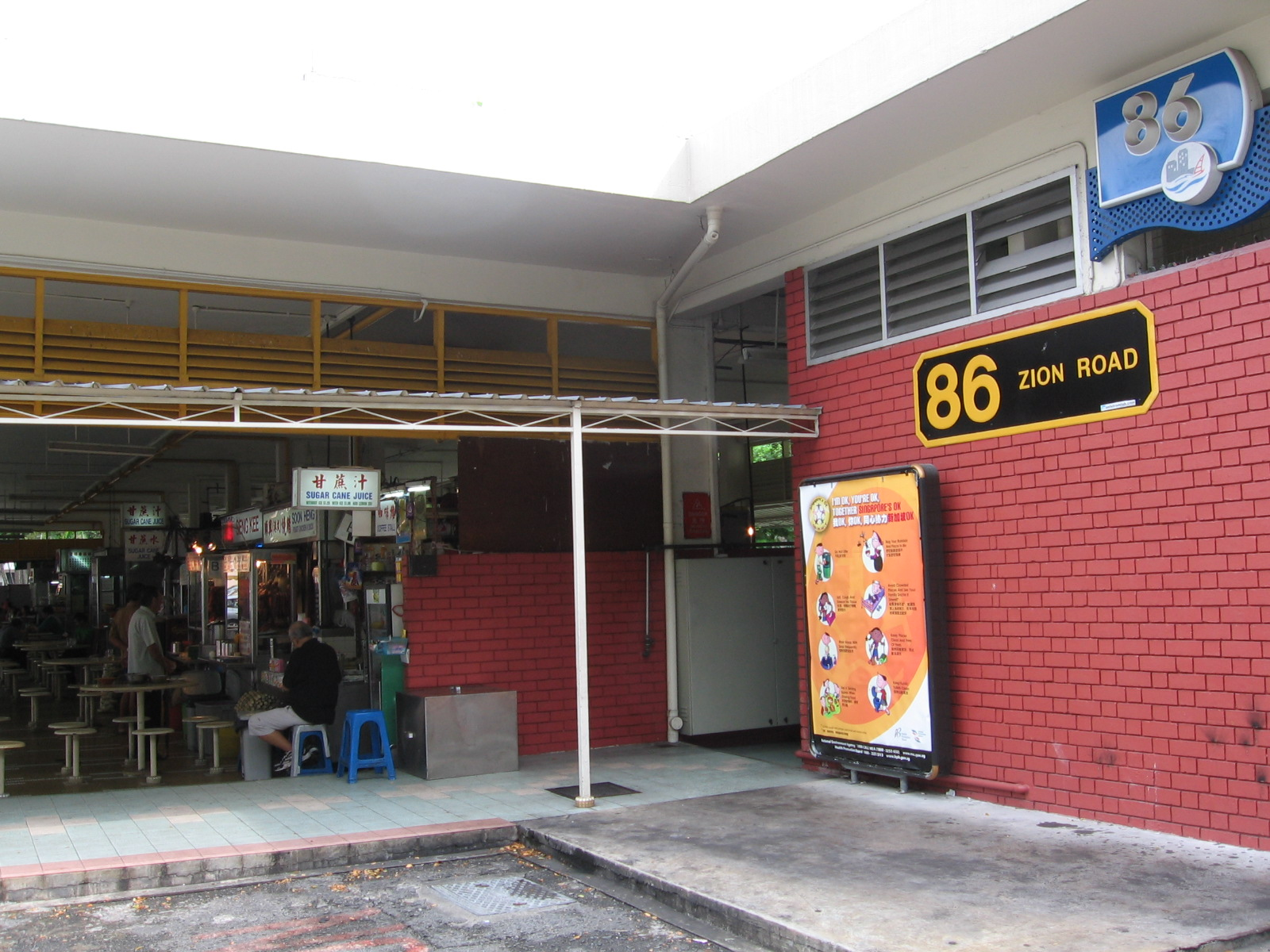
86 Zion Road in 2006

The hawker centre closed on 26 September 2002 to undergo major renovations. Some hawkers relocated to the nearby hawker centre at 86 Zion Road.

=== Zion Riverside Food Centre ===
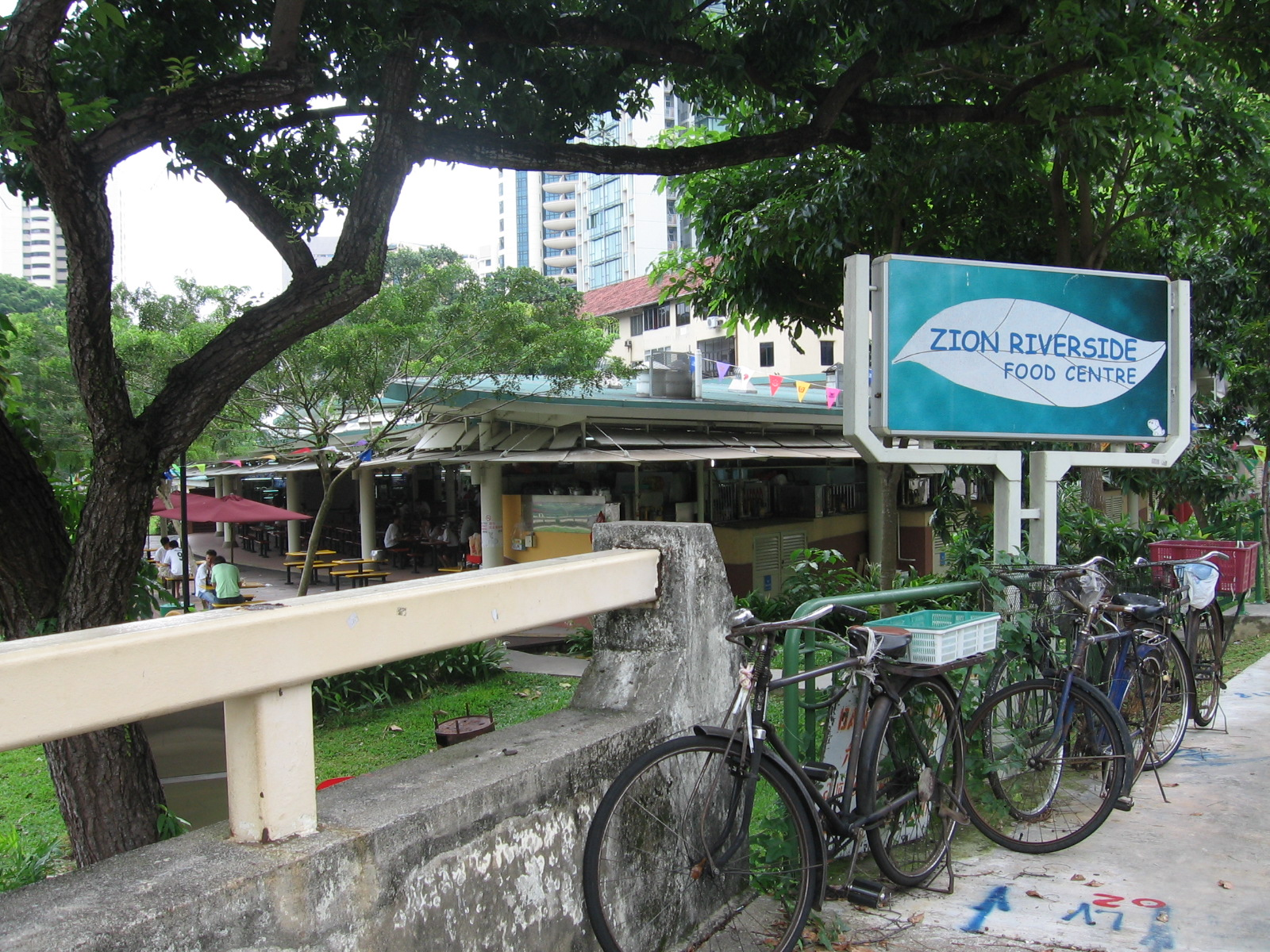
Zion Riverside in 2006

On 1 April 2003, Zion Road Food Centre reopened as Zion Riverside Food Centre, with 32 stalls. A tray return system trial began, but shortly stopped after six months as most patrons wanted cleaners to clear their trays instead. On 16 September 2008, Senior Parliamentary Secretary Amy Khor announced plans to revive the tray return system by the end of 2008; however, the trial was unsuccessful again. On 11 September 2012, Minister for the Environment and Water Resources Vivian Balakrishnan announced plans to revive the system again by the end of 2012. Most patrons made the effort to clear their tables, but there were still some patrons who only cleared their tables after reminders from volunteers.

Zion Riverside is home to two Bib Gourmand stalls, namely No. 18 Zion Road Fried Kway Teow and Zion Road Big Prawn Noodles, awarded in 2023 and 2018, respectively.

== See also ==
- Hawker centre
- Singaporean cuisine
