= Ark King Solomon Academy =

King Solomon Academy

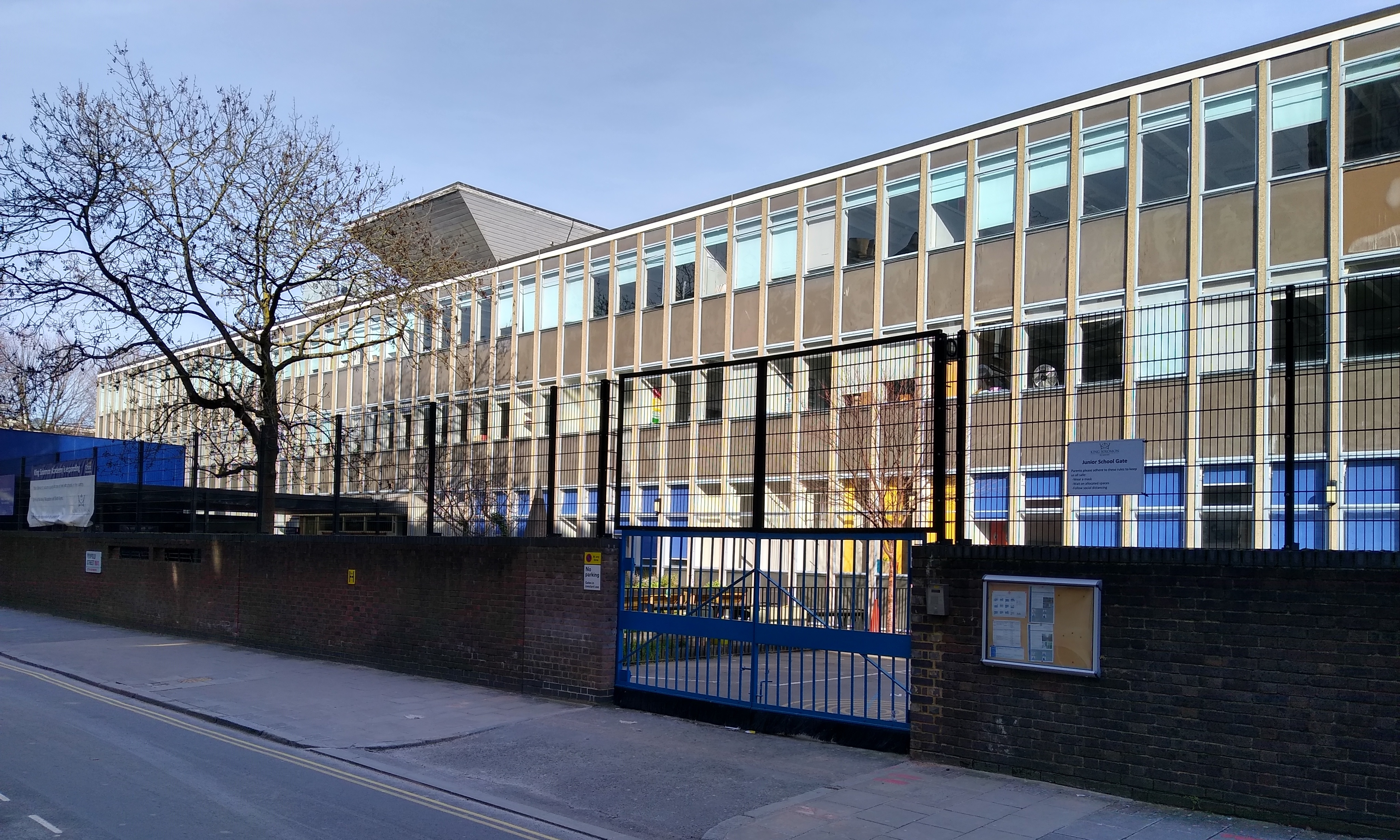

Location
- Penfold Street; London, NW1 6RX; England; 51.521922°N 0.168829°W

Information
- Type: Academy
- Established: 2007
- Local authority: Westminster
- Department for Education URN: 135242 Tables
- Ofsted: Reports
- Chair: Ron Beller
- Headteacher: Max Haimendorf (Primary and Secondary)
- Gender: Mixed
- Age: 3 to 18
- Website: www.kingsolomonacademy.org

King Solomon Academy is a non-selective, non-denominational, mixed all-through school within the national academy programme, located in Lisson Grove, in the City of Westminster. It occupies the site of the former Rutherford School and North Westminster Community School.

== History ==
The Rutherford School was built from 1958 to 1960, designed by the architect Leonard Manasseh, and is a Grade II* listed building.

The primary school opened in September 2007, and the secondary school opened in September 2009. The school is an all-through school with pupils ranging in age from 3 to 18, with the primary school feeding directly into the secondary. It has sixty pupils in each year. The school is partly modelled on the KIPP program, which originated in the US.

In December 2008, Ofsted conducted a monitoring visit and rated the academy as 'outstanding'. In December 2009, Ofsted conducted a full inspection and rated the school outstanding.

The school is funded by the Department for Education but is operated by Ark schools, a registered charity under English law, and sponsored by parent charity Ark.

The current headmaster of the secondary school is Max Haimendorf, a graduate of St. Hugh's College, Oxford, who was amongst the first cohort of the Teach First programme.

In 2015, the school was rated as the best non-selective secondary school in England according to the Department for Education's GCSE league tables.

== See also ==
- Ark (charity)
- List of schools in the City of Westminster
