= Ezekiel Saleh Manasseh =

Singaporean merchant and hotelier (died 1944)

Ezekiel Saleh Manasseh, 1930

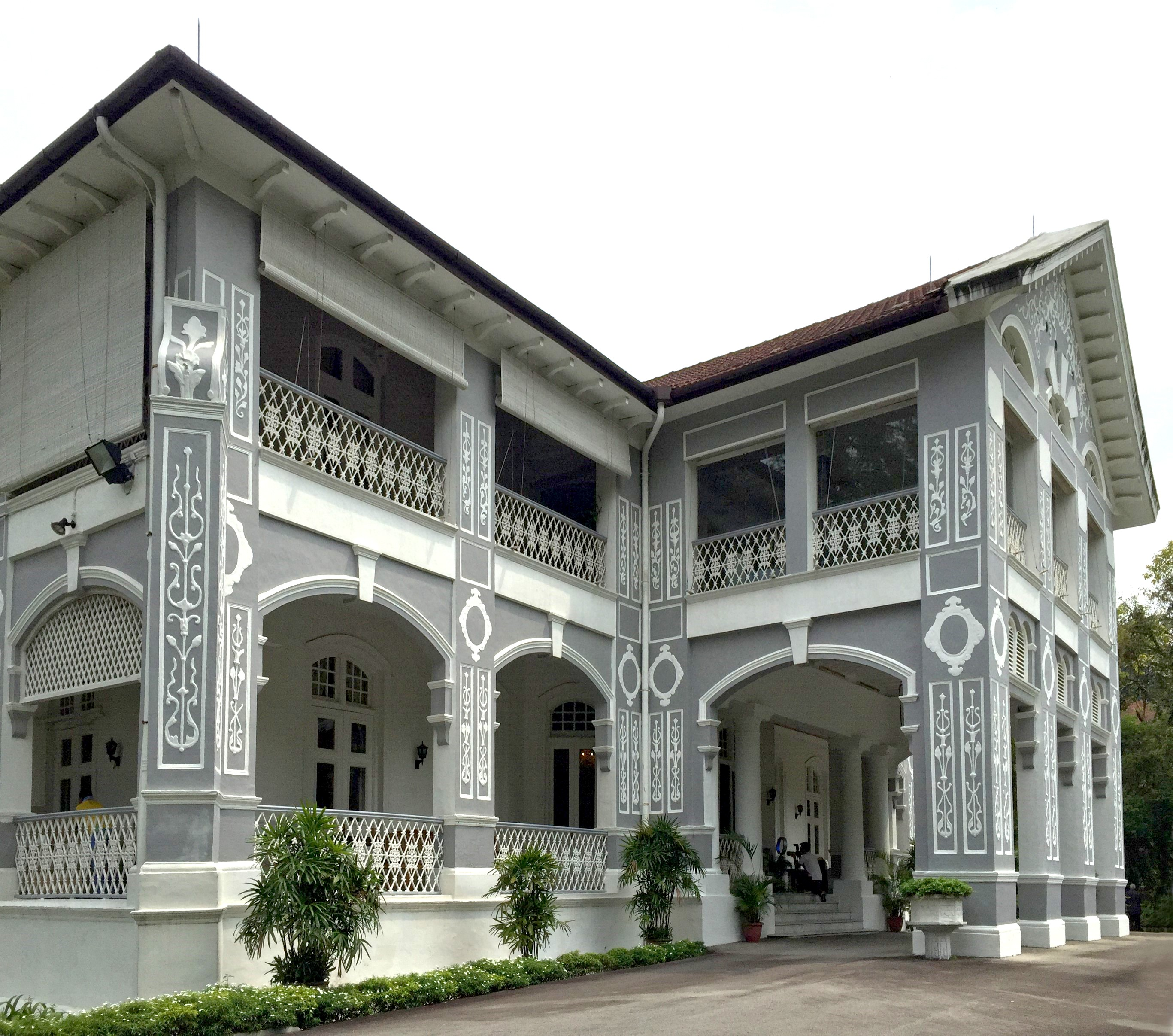
Eden Hall, Singapore

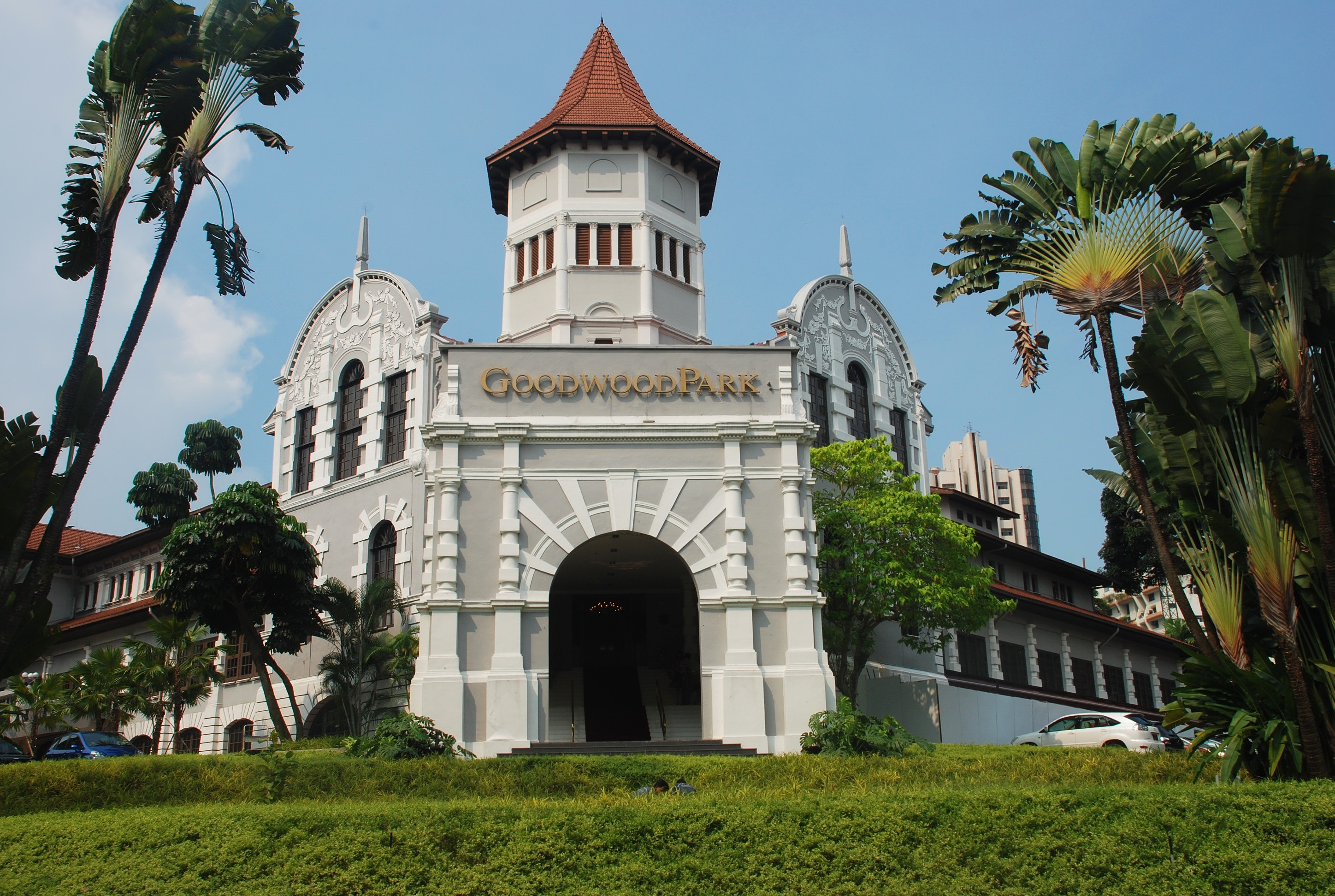
Goodwood Park Hotel

Ezekiel Saleh Manasseh (died 19 May 1944) was a Singaporean rice and opium merchant and hotelier of Iraqi-Jewish descent, who co-founded Singapore's Goodwood Park Hotel with his brothers Morris and Ellis. During the Japanese occupation, Manasseh was sent to Changi Prison where he died in 1944. Eden Hall was built as his home in 1904, and is now the official residence of the British High Commissioner in Singapore.

== Early life ==
Ezekiel Saleh Manasseh was born in Calcutta, the son of Saleh Manasseh, the founder and owner of S. Menasseh & Company (Gunny Rice and Opium Merchants), which was founded in Calcutta in 1883.

In 1885, his father at S. Menasseh & Company was in partnership with Saul Jacob Nathan, and after his death, was replaced by his widow Mrs S Manasseh, and Maurice Saleh Manasseh, Ezekiel Saleh Manasseh, and Reuben Manasseh all joined the partnership.

== Career ==
Manasseh, a rice and opium merchant, had Eden Hall built for him in 1904 to a design by R. A. J. Bidwell, who also designed the Raffles Hotel and the Goodwood Park Hotel. It is now the official residence of the British High Commissioner in Singapore.

In 1918, after the end of World War One and the defeat of Germany, the British government sold what had been the Teutonia Club by public auction to the Manasseh brothers (Morris, Ezekiel and Ellis), who renamed it Goodwood Hall and converted it into the Goodwood Park Hotel. Manasseh continued to be a third owner until his death.

In 1924–1925, Manasseh built numbers 1, 3 and 5 Club Street. In the 1930s, he was the chairman of the Singapore Turf Club. He was a trustee of the Maghain Aboth Synagogue.

== Personal life ==
Manasseh was married and had two stepchildren, Vivian and Molly Bath. Molly was the mother of British celebrity chef and hunting rights campaigner Clarissa Dickson Wright. His stepson Vivian went to a labour camp on the Japanese island of Hokkaido.

When Singapore was taken by the Japanese in 1942, Manasseh was sent to Changi Prison, and died there on 19 May 1944 in the prison hospital on Sime Road, aged recordedly 68.

His nephew was the architect Leonard Manasseh, who was born in Eden Hall in 1916.
