= Khoo Teck Puat =

Singaporean hotelier (1917–2004)

Yang Berbahagia Tan Sri Dato' Khoo Teck Puat PSM SPMT
- 邱德拔
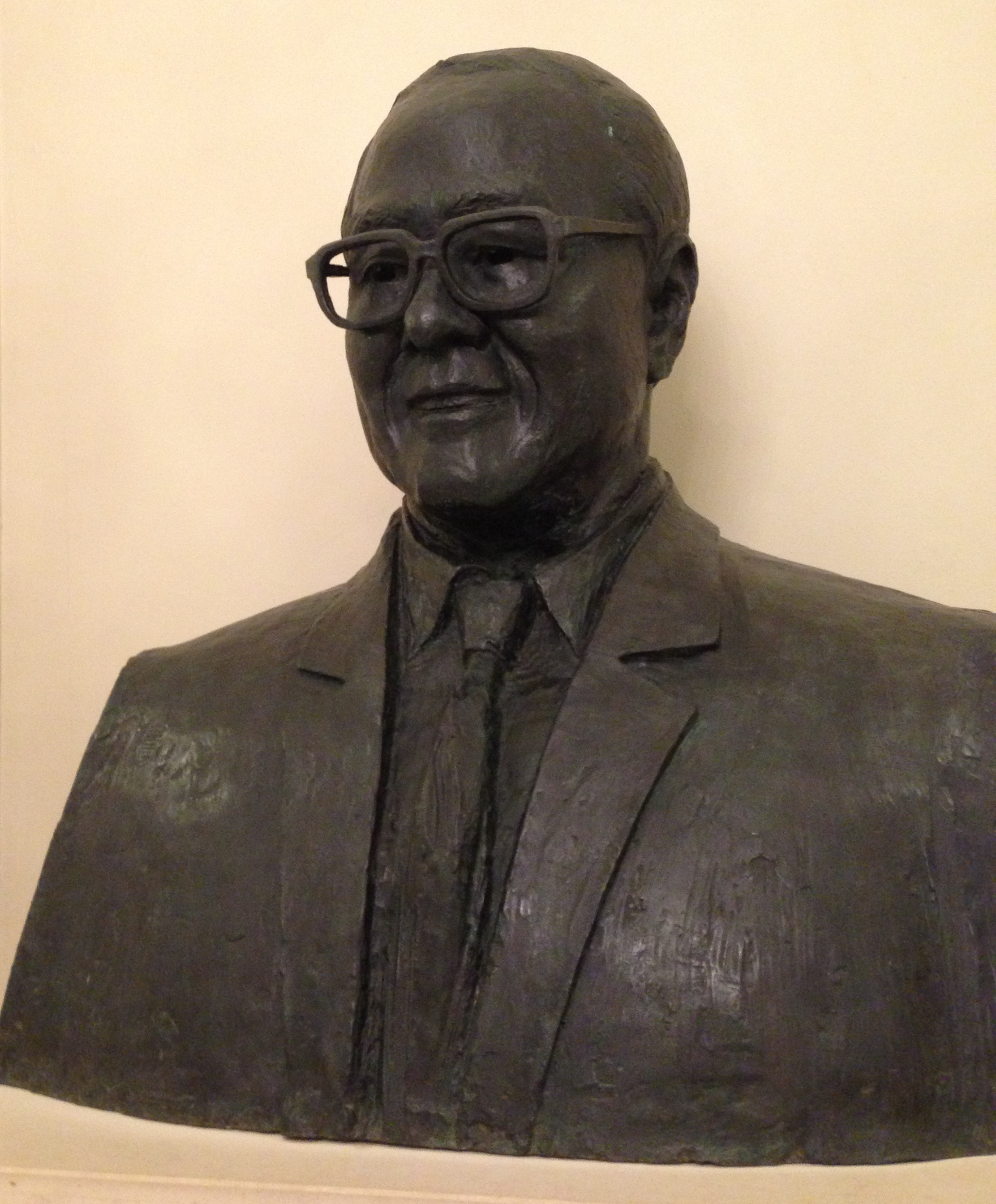
- A bust of Khoo in the lobby of the Goodwood Park Hotel, Singapore
- Born: 13 January 1917; Singapore, Straits Settlements
- Died: 21 February 2004 (aged 87); Singapore
- Citizenship: Malaysian (1957–1981); Australian (1981–1994); Singaporean (1994–2004)
- Education: St Joseph's Institution
- Known for: Singapore's richest man Philanthropist; fugitive in the banking scandal of the National Bank of Brunei
- Spouses: Tan Geok Yin (deceased 1972); Rose Marie Wee; Renee Chew
- Children: 11 daughters and 4 sons, including Eric Khoo (filmmaker)

Tan Sri Dato' Khoo Teck Puat (Chinese: 邱德拔; Pe̍h-ōe-jī: Khu Tek-poa̍t; pinyin: Qiū Débá; 13 January 1917 – 21 February 2004) was a banker and hotel owner, who, with an estimated fortune of S$4.3 billion (US$3,195,953,500), was the wealthiest man in Singapore at one point. He owned the Goodwood Group of boutique hotels in London and Singapore and was the largest single shareholder of the British bank Standard Chartered. The bulk of his fortune came from shares in Standard Chartered, which he bought in the 1980s to help thwart Lloyds Bank's proposed acquisition, deemed hostile by many financiers. The Goodwood Park Hotel in Singapore, built in 1900, is a restored historic landmark.

Around the period of his death in 2004, Khoo was ranked as the 108th richest person in the world by the business magazine Forbes. Khoo's estate has donated S$80 million to Duke–NUS Medical School.

== Biography ==
Khoo received his early education at St Joseph's Institution in Singapore in 1930. He was educated up to standard eight prior to his marriage, at the age of 17, and he began working at the Oversea-Chinese Banking Corporation (OCBC) as an apprentice clerk by 1933. While attached to OCBC, Khoo served as the chairman of the Central Provident Fund board for a year in 1958. His rise within OCBC was rapid, and he developed strong ties with Tan Chin Tuan until they had a difference of opinion, which resulted in him leaving OCBC in 1959, from the position of deputy general manager.

== Career ==
In 1960, Khoo restarted his career in banking by founding Malayan Banking (now commonly known as Maybank) with a few partners in Kuala Lumpur. The bank grew rapidly to more than 150 branches within three years.

In 1963, the bank purchased Goodwood Park Hotel in Singapore for S$4.8 million.

From 1964 to 1965, Khoo was a senator in the Malaysian parliament.

In 1965, he was ousted from Maybank by the Malaysian government, under Deputy Prime Minister Tun Abdul Razak, on the pretext of pumping the bank's money into his own private firm in Singapore.

In 1968, Khoo purchased Maybank's Singapore properties, including Goodwood Park Hotel and Central Properties, for S$50 million.

In 1976, he ceased to be a director at Maybank.

In 1981, Khoo bought Australia's Southern Pacific Hotel Corporation—parent of the Travelodge chain—using funds from the National Bank of Brunei, which he had opened in the 1960s. He sold it in 1988 as part of his asset liquidation process to make restitution to the Bruneian government.

After the death of the former Sultan Omar in 1986, Sultan Hassanal arranged for an investigation into the finances of the National Bank, leading to its closure. Khoo had allegedly taken unsecured and undocumented loans of more than £300 million from the bank. He was never charged, but his son Khoo Ban Hock served two years in prison for his role in the affair.

In 1986, an opportunity arose when, as a white knight, Khoo made an acquisition of a 5% stake in the British bank Standard Chartered, being one of three financiers who came to the bank's rescue to stave off a hostile takeover by Lloyds Bank. He subsequently grew his stake to almost 15%, to become the single largest shareholder.

He was listed as Singapore's richest businessman by the business magazine Forbes in 2003.

In 2004, after Khoo died at Mount Elizabeth Hospital from a heart attack, it was revealed that he had a bigger stake in three of his listed companies—Goodwood Park, Hotel Malaysia, and Central Properties—than was disclosed to the Singapore Exchange. His daughters, Jacqueline and Elizabeth, who were in management positions at the companies, were fined a total of S$500,000. Khoo left his Standard Chartered stake, then approximately 11.5%, to his children. In March 2006, they sold it to Singapore's Temasek Holdings.

== Philanthropy ==
In 1981, Khoo set up the Khoo Foundation charity fund, with an initial S$20 million. The foundation donated S$125 million towards the construction and operation of a hospital, Alexandra Hospital @ Yishun. In 2007, the hospital was renamed as Khoo Teck Puat Hospital.

In February 1990, the Khoo Foundation donated S$100,000 to the Singapore government's 25th anniversary charity fund in support of children, the elderly, and the disabled. Later in May, Khoo donated $2.5 million—$0.8 million himself and another $1.7 million on behalf of the Khoo Foundation—which is the single largest donation to the fund.

== Honours ==
- Malaysia
  - Commander of the Order of Loyalty to the Crown of Malaysia (PSM) – Tan Sri (1966)
- Terengganu
  - Knight Grand Commander of the Order of the Crown of Terengganu (SPMT) – Dato' (1965)

== Bibliography ==
- Archibald, J. F.; Haynes, J., The bulletin, Issues 5642–5649, 1988
- Forbes, Bertie Charles, Forbes, Volume 154, Issues 1–5, Forbes Inc., 1994
