= Leonard Manasseh =

British architect

Leonard Sulla Manasseh OBE RA PPRWA (21 May 1916 – 5 March 2017) was a British architect, best known for the National Motor Museum, Beaulieu, which he co-designed with Ian Baker.

== Early life and education ==
Manasseh was born in Eden Hall, Singapore, which was then the house of his uncle Ezekiel Manasseh, a rice and opium merchant, and is now the residence of the British High Commissioner. His father, Alan Manasseh, was a partner in the family firm of S Manasseh and Co, and his mother, Esther, the sister of Joseph Elias, a wealthy Singaporean merchant who provided the financial support to send Leonard and his sister Sylvia to England to be schooled. Leonard went to preparatory school in Surrey and Cheltenham College before becoming a student at the Architectural Association School of Architecture in Bedford Square that he attended from 1935 to 1941.

== Career ==
After the Second World War, in which Manasseh served as a pilot in the Fleet Air Arm, he worked as an assistant architect in Hertfordshire County Council Architects Department from 1946 to 1948 and then as a senior architect for the Stevenage Development Corporation.

Manasseh's reputation rose with his work at the Festival of Britain, and he formed Leonard Manasseh and Partners with Ian Baker, becoming "one of the leading British architects of the 1960s". In 1958–60 Rutherford School, Paddington, was built to a design by Manasseh and Baker and in 1964 they designed the National Motor Museum, Beaulieu.

During his career Manasseh had a close relationship with the Architectural Association, as a teacher and, from 1964 to 1965, as its president. He served as a council member for various architectural associations and, in 1989, he was elected the first architect president of the Royal West of England Academy, a post he undertook until 1994.

He published numerous articles in architectural magazines and, together with Roger Cunliffe, wrote Office Buildings for B.T. Batsford Ltd in 1962. His firm also produced a report, Snowdon Summit, for the Countryside Commission in 1975 which proposed a new summit building on Snowdon and was reviewed in Environmental Conservation.

== Other ==
Manasseh also had a close ties with the Royal Academy of Arts, London, he was elected an Associate on 30 April 1976, a Royal Academician on 9 May 1979 and a Senior Royal Academician on 1 October 1991. In 2016 he became the first centenarian Royal Academician. Described as “an accomplished painter in oils and watercolours”, Manasseh exhibited his work regularly at the Royal Academy Summer Exhibition and, in 1977, the academy presented Her Royal Highness, Queen Elizabeth II with a watercolour painting executed by him The Rescue, Wednesday 24, XI, 1976 as a Silver Jubilee Gift that is now held in the Royal Collection.

In the 1982 Birthday Honours, he was appointed an Officer of the Order of the British Empire.

A portrait in oils of the architect by the artist Jennifer McRae is in the collection of the National Portrait Gallery, London and a photographic portrait by the photographer, Reginald Hugo de Burgh Galwey, is held by RIBA. Photographs attributed to Manasseh are held in the Conway Library at The Courtauld Institute of Art whose archive, of primarily architectural images, is in the process of being digitised under the wider Courtauld Connects project.

National Life Stories conducted an oral history interview (C467/27) with Leonard Manasseh in 1998 for its Architects Lives' collection held by the British Library.

== Private life ==
Manasseh was firstly married to Karen Willinger (1919–2008), a textile designer, with whom he had two sons, Alan and Zachary, and, after they divorced following her desertion that forced Manasseh to return to England from Singapore where he was setting up a practice, he married Sarah Delaforce in 1957. They had three children, a daughter, Rebecca, and two sons, Amos and Phineas, and the extended family lived at 6 Bacon's Lane, Highgate, a house designed by Manasseh that was completed in 1959.

Manasseh turned 100 in May 2016 and died in March 2017. He was predeceased by both his wives, his oldest son Alan and his daughter, Rebecca. His son Amos became custodian of the Highgate property in 2019. In that year, Leonard Manasseh's granddaughter, Chloe Manasseh, an artist, undertook a commission for The British High Commission in Singapore which referenced her late grandfather's recollections of his childhood in Eden Hall, Singapore. His son Phineas (Phin) is also an architect.
