= Scotts Road =

Road in Singapore

Coordinates: 1°18′41.18″N 103°50′12.26″E

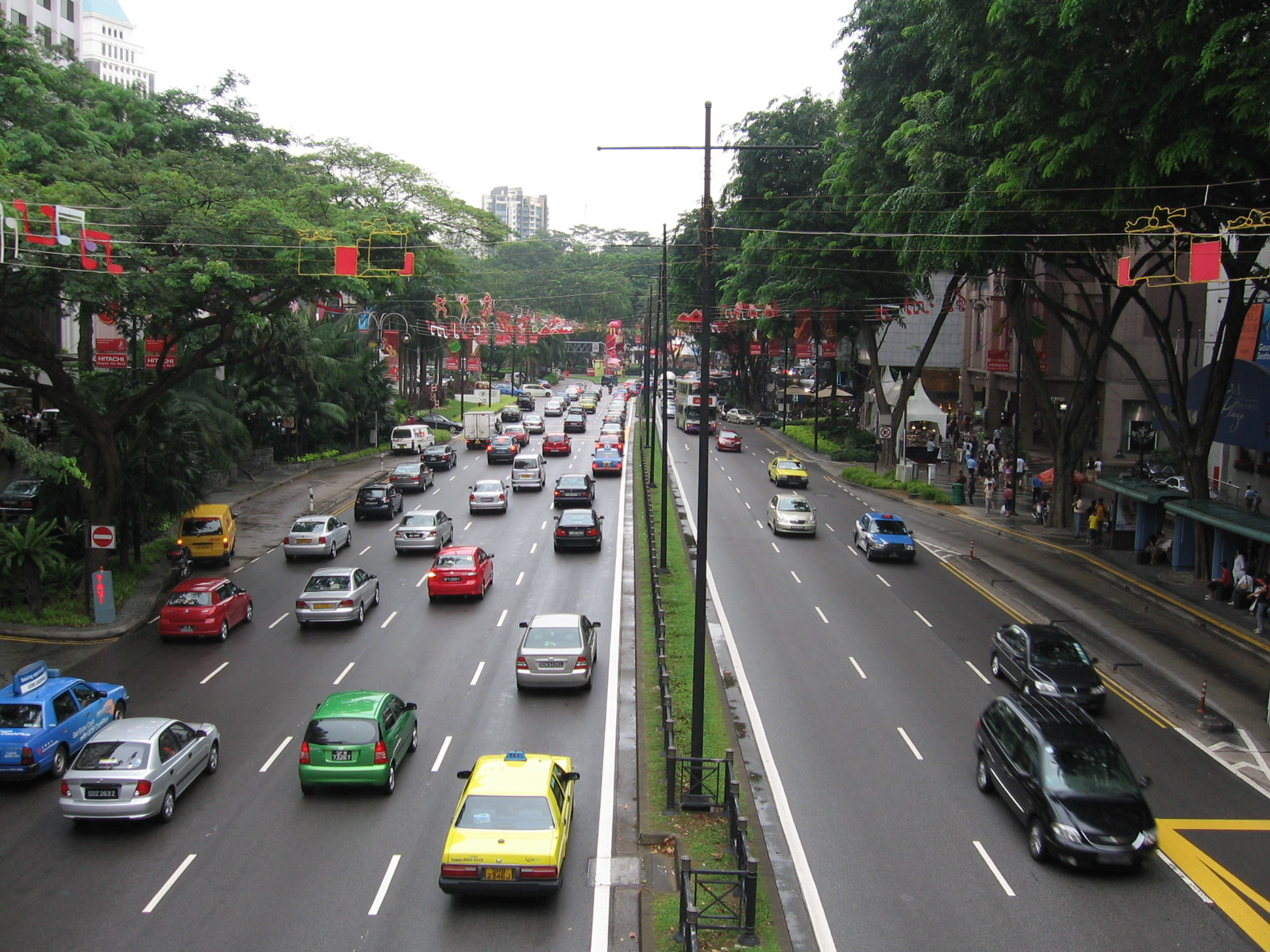
A view of Scotts Road seen from an overhead bridge

Scotts Road (Chinese: 史各士路) is a road located in Central Area of Singapore. It was named after Captain William G. Scott, Harbour Master and Post Master of Singapore in 1836, who owned property and plantations on and around the area where Scotts Road now stands.
