= List of Singapore MRT stations =

A geographical map of the MRT system with an inset of the Downtown Core, with sections under construction and proposed future lines included. The grey lines are part of the Light Rail Transit (LRT) system.

The Mass Rapid Transit (MRT) (Note: Chinese: 地铁; Tamil: எம்ஆர்டி) is a rapid transit system in Singapore and the country's principal mode of public transport. Owned by the Land Transport Authority (LTA), the system spans 246.6 kilometres (153.2 mi) and has six lines: the North–South Line (NSL), East–West Line (EWL), North East Line (NEL), Circle Line (CCL), Downtown Line (DTL), and Thomson–East Coast Line (TEL). The MRT has two operators: SMRT Trains and SBS Transit. SMRT operates the NSL, EWL, CCL, and TEL, whilst SBS operates the NEL and DTL. Two MRT lines – the Jurong Region Line (JRL) and the Cross Island Line (CRL) – are under construction. As of 2025, the MRT serves 3.49 million passengers a day. As of July 2026, there are 146 stations in operation, all of which are wheelchair accessible. Some MRT stations are public civil defence shelters, which protect occupants from attacks during a wartime emergency. Additionally, most NEL, CCL, DTL, and TEL stations in operation, as well as two NSL stations, have public artworks as part of the Art in Transit programme.

All MRT lines pass through the Central Area. With 35 stations, the EWL starts from Pasir Ris and terminates at Tuas Link, serving areas such as Tampines, Bedok, Queenstown, Clementi, and Jurong West. At Tanah Merah station, the line splits into a branch service, the Changi Airport Extension (CAE); the CAE service operates from Tanah Merah to Changi Airport stations. The NSL, with 27 stations, starts from Jurong East and terminates at Marina South Pier. The line goes through areas such as Choa Chu Kang, Sembawang, Yishun, and Toa Payoh. The NEL, serving 17 stations, starts from HarbourFront and terminates at Punggol Coast; the areas the line passes through outside of the Central Area include Serangoon, Hougang, Sengkang, and Punggol.

The CCL serves 33 stations, of which 30 operate within a closed loop. Areas passed through by the CCL include Geylang, Serangoon, Toa Payoh, Queenstown, and Bukit Merah. The remaining three stations, Dhoby Ghaut, Bras Basah and Esplanade, are part of a branch line between Dhoby Ghaut and Promenade; trains on this service terminate at Prince Edward Road during peak hours, and at Stadium during non-peak hours. The DTL starts from Bukit Panjang and terminates at Expo, serving 35 stations in areas such as Bukit Panjang, Bukit Timah, Geylang, Bedok, and Changi; the line also crosses itself in a loop in the Central Area. With 27 stations, the TEL spans from Woodlands North to Bayshore stations and passes through areas such as Woodlands, Mandai, Ang Mo Kio, and Marine Parade.

There are nine standalone terminal stations, 21 interchange stations, and six stations that are both terminal and interchange stations. There are 25 stations connected to bus interchanges, whilst four stations interchange with the Light Rail Transit (LRT) system. Changi Airport station offers connections to Changi Airport Terminals 2 and 3, and Marina South Pier and HarbourFront stations have connections to ferry services; HarbourFront is also connected with the Singapore Cable Car and Sentosa Express. There are four non-operational stations planned to open in the future, which are Bukit Brown on the CCL as well as Marina South, Mount Pleasant, and Tagore on the TEL. 42 stations are under construction; of these, Bahar Junction is the only station designated as an interchange, whilst three stations – Aviation Park, Pandan Reservoir, and Peng Kang Hill – are terminal stations. Three stations – Jurong Pier, Sungei Bedok, and West Coast – are both interchange and terminal stations. Riviera station on the CRL is planned to interchange with the existing Riviera LRT station. Seven stations are in planning; of these, two stations, Changi Terminal 5 and Sungei Kadut, are expected to be terminal and interchange stations. The former is also planned to be connected to Changi Airport Terminal 5.

== History ==
A geographical map of the initial MRT system by 1990

Plans for a national rail transport system were conceptualised in a study by the Singapore government and United Nations Development Programme in 1971, which hypothesised that the country would need such a system by 1992. Various studies on the feasibility of a rapid transit system were conducted between 1972 and 1980, with some experts opposing the idea and arguing that Singapore's bus system should be further expanded. The government approved the MRT's construction in 1982, and the first phase of the system opened on 7 November 1987 with five stations from Yio Chu Kang to Toa Payoh. Between 1987 and 1988, 20 stations commenced operations. However, the MRT system was split into two lines on 28 October 1989: the North–South Line (NSL), which went from Yishun to Marina Bay, and the East–West Line (EWL), which went from Tanah Merah to Lakeside. Following the split, 13 stations commenced operations in 1989. Station architecture during that time was basic, with the focus being safety with simple aesthetics. However, some elevated stations had distinct roof designs, such as the Chinese-style roofs of Chinese Garden and Lakeside stations, the Minangkabau-style roof of Eunos, and the vaulted roofs of stations from Kallang to Pasir Ris. A new line, the Branch Line, opened on 10 March 1990, and consisted of four stations from Jurong East to Choa Chu Kang. With the opening of Boon Lay station on 6 July 1990, the initial MRT system was completed.

Six stations on the NSL's Woodlands Extension, from Sembawang to Yew Tee, opened on 10 February 1996. The Branch Line was merged with the NSL on the same date. Between 2001 and 2002, three stations on the EWL opened. On 20 June 2003, most of the North East Line (NEL), which consisted of 12 stations from HarbourFront to Punggol, opened; two stations, Buangkok and Woodleigh, later opened as infill stations on 15 January 2006 and 20 June 2011, respectively. The initial NEL stations were designed to reflect their location, such as the leaf-shaped metal grill patterns – akin to door patterns of Hindu prayer rooms – on the walls of Little India. Furthermore, most station entrances were made of glass to allow natural lighting. The NEL also saw the implementation of the Art in Transit programme, a public arts programme where local artists are commissioned to create artworks that would be integrated as part of the stations' design; the artworks focus on Singapore's history and community. On 28 February 2009, the EWL was extended to Joo Koon and Pioneer stations.

The opening of the Circle Line (CCL) from Marymount to Bartley on 28 May 2009 introduced three new stations; 20 new stations on the line were opened in various stages between 2010 and 2012. The LTA designed those stations to be "high-tech" so that they would not go "out of style" in the future. Architecture on the CCL includes Bras Basah station, where its roof also serves as a reflective pool for the nearby Singapore Art Museum.

The opening of the Downtown Line (DTL) also introduced two new stations from Bugis to Chinatown on 22 December 2013, with nine stations from Bukit Panjang to Rochor and 13 stations from Fort Canning to Expo commencing operations on 27 December 2015 and 21 October 2017, respectively. The DTL saw the construction of the MRT's deepest station, Bencoolen, at 43 metres (141 ft); construction challenges involve temporarily diverting the Singapore River. From 2014 to 2019, several new stations opened on existing lines, including the NSL extension to Marina South Pier, four stations from Gul Circle to Tuas Link on the EWL, and Canberra as an infill station on the NSL.

The opening of the Thomson–East Coast Line (TEL) on 31 January 2020 included two new stations from Woodlands North to Woodlands South. Subsequently, 19 new stations on the TEL commenced operations from 2021 to 2024. The NEL extended to Punggol Coast on 10 December 2024, and Hume station opened on the DTL as an infill station on 28 February 2025. Cantonment, Keppel, and Prince Edward Road stations on the CCL opened on 12 July 2026, completing the CCL's loop.

On 26 December 2026, the DTL and TEL will be extended to interchange with each other at Sungei Bedok; Bedok South on the TEL and Xilin on the DTL are scheduled to open at the same time. Also on the TEL, Founders' Memorial station is planned to open at the end of 2028. There are two upcoming lines on the MRT: the Jurong Region Line (JRL) and Cross Island Line (CRL). 21 stations on the JRL are under construction and are scheduled to commence operations in three stages from 2028 to 2029, including 14 stations in 2028 and seven stations in 2029. As for the CRL, 26 stations are planned to commence operations in various stages in the 2030s, including 12 stations in 2030, six stations and a branch from Pasir Ris to Punggol consisting of four stations in 2032, and four stations in the late 2030s. Five stations under planning are expected to open around the mid-2030s, which are Brickland on the NSL in 2034, DE1 on the DTL and Sungei Kadut on the NSL and DTL in 2035, Changi Terminal 5 on the TEL and CRL, and JS2A on the JRL.

== MRT stations ==
* Interchange station
‡ Terminus
^ Interchange station and terminus
† Unnamed station
Civil defence shelter
Bus interchange
Changi Airport
Ferry terminal
LRT interchange
Sentosa Express
Singapore Cable Car

=== In operation ===
Operational stations with their Chinese, Malay, and Tamil names, along with their station code, line services, opening date, and transport connections
Station name			Station code (Note: Station codes in this column are displayed as they are on the official MRT map. Station codes with a dash between them represent a tap-out transfer.)	Line (Note: This column includes lines that are planned to interchange with the station, former line services, and branches of lines.)	Opened (Note: This column refers to the first date the station officially opened. It does not include dates of opening for subsequent line connections, future lines, renovations, or platform additions, which can be found in the articles for the individual stations.)	Connections (Note: This column contains transport connections listed on the MRT map.)	Ref
English (Note: Most station names retain their English names for the Malay translations, except for Botanic Gardens and Gardens by the Bay, which are Kebun Bunga and Taman Di Persisiran, respectively.)	Chinese	Tamil	Station code	Line	Opened	Connections	Ref
Admiralty	海军部	அட்மிரல்ட்டி	NS10	North–South Line	10 February 1996		
Aljunied	阿裕尼	அல்ஜூனிட்	EW9	East–West Line	4 November 1989		
Ang Mo Kio	宏茂桥	அங் மோ கியோ	NS16	North–South Line; Cross Island Line (under construction)	7 November 1987	Ang Mo Kio Bus Interchange	
Bartley	巴特礼	பார்ட்லி	CC12	Circle Line	28 May 2009		
Bayfront *	海湾舫	பேஃபிரண்ட்	CC34 DT16	Circle Line; Downtown Line	14 January 2012		
Bayshore ‡	碧湾	பேஷோர்	TE29	Thomson–East Coast Line	23 June 2024		
Beauty World	美世界	பியூட்டி வோர்ல்ட்	DT5	Downtown Line	27 December 2015		
Bedok	勿洛	பிடோக்	EW5	East–West Line	4 November 1989	Bedok Bus Interchange	
Bedok North	勿洛北	பிடோக் நார்த்	DT29	Downtown Line	21 October 2017		
Bedok Reservoir	勿洛蓄水池	பிடோக் ரெசவோர்	DT30	Downtown Line	21 October 2017		
Bencoolen	明古连	பென்கூலன்	DT21	Downtown Line	21 October 2017		
Bendemeer	明地迷亚	பெண்டிமியர்	DT23	Downtown Line	21 October 2017		
Bishan *	碧山	பீஷான்	NS17 CC15	North–South Line; Circle Line	7 November 1987	Bishan Bus Interchange	
Boon Keng	文庆	பூன் கெங்	NE9	North East Line	20 June 2003		
Boon Lay	文礼	பூன் லே	EW27	East–West Line; Jurong Region Line (under construction)	6 July 1990	Boon Lay Bus Interchange	
Botanic Gardens *	植物园	பூ மலை	CC19 DT9	Circle Line; Downtown Line	8 October 2011		
Braddell	布莱德	பிரேடல்	NS18	North–South Line	7 November 1987		
Bras Basah	百胜	பிராஸ் பாசா	CC2	Circle Line	17 April 2010		
Bright Hill	光明山	பிரைட் ஹில்	TE7	Thomson–East Coast Line; Cross Island Line (under construction)	28 August 2021		
Buangkok	万国	புவாங்கோக்	NE15	North East Line	15 January 2006	Buangkok Bus Interchange	
Bugis *	武吉士	பூகிஸ்	EW12 DT14	East–West Line; Downtown Line	4 November 1989		
Bukit Batok	武吉巴督	புக்கிட் பாத்தோக்	NS2	Branch Line (10 March 1990 to 10 February 1996); North–South Line (Branch Line merger)	10 March 1990	Bukit Batok Bus Interchange	
Bukit Gombak	武吉甘柏	புக்கிட் கோம்பாக்	NS3	Branch Line (10 March 1990 to 10 February 1996); North–South Line (Branch Line merger)	10 March 1990		
Bukit Panjang ‡	武吉班让	புக்கிட் பாஞ்சாங்	BP6 – DT1	Downtown Line	27 December 2015	Bukit Panjang Bus Interchange; Bukit Panjang LRT station	
Buona Vista *	波那维斯达	புவன விஸ்தா	EW21 CC22	East–West Line; Circle Line	12 March 1988		
Caldecott *	加利谷	கால்டிகாட்	CC17 TE9	Circle Line; Thomson–East Coast Line	8 October 2011		
Canberra	坎贝拉	கென்பரா	NS12	North–South Line	2 November 2019		
Cantonment	广东民	கெண்டொன்மன்	CC31	Circle Line	12 July 2026		
Cashew	凯秀	கேஷ்யூ	DT2	Downtown Line	27 December 2015		
Changi Airport ‡	樟宜机场	சாங்கி விமானநிலையம்	CG2	East–West Line; Thomson–East Coast Line (replacing the Changi Airport Extension)	8 February 2002	Changi Airport Terminal 2 and Terminal 3	
Chinatown *	牛车水	சைனாடவுன்	NE4 DT19	North East Line; Downtown Line	20 June 2003		
Chinese Garden	裕华园	சீனத் தோட்டம்	EW25	East–West Line	5 November 1988		
Choa Chu Kang	蔡厝港	சுவா சூ காங்	NS4 BP1	Branch Line (10 March 1990 to 10 February 1996); North–South Line (Branch Line merger); Jurong Region Line (under construction)	10 March 1990	Choa Chu Kang Bus Interchange; Choa Chu Kang LRT station	
City Hall *	政府大厦	நகர மண்டபம்	NS25 EW13	North–South Line; East–West Line	12 December 1987		
Clarke Quay	克拉码头	கிளார்க் கீ	NE5	North East Line	20 June 2003		
Clementi	金文泰	கிளிமெண்டி	EW23	East–West Line; Cross Island Line (under construction)	12 March 1988	Clementi Bus Interchange	
Commonwealth	联邦	காமன்வெல்த்	EW20	East–West Line	12 March 1988		
Dakota	达科达	டகோட்டா	CC8	Circle Line	17 April 2010		
Dhoby Ghaut ^	多美歌	தோபி காட்	NS24 NE6 CC1	North–South Line; North East Line; Circle Line	12 December 1987		
Dover	杜弗	டோவெர்	EW22	East–West Line	18 October 2001		
Downtown	市中心	டௌன்டவுன்	DT17	Downtown Line	22 December 2013		
Esplanade	滨海中心	எஸ்பிளனேட்	CC3	Circle Line	17 April 2010		
Eunos	友诺士	யூனுஸ்	EW7	East–West Line	4 November 1989	Eunos Bus Interchange	
Expo ^	博览	எக்ஸ்போ	CG1 DT35	East–West Line; Downtown Line; Thomson–East Coast Line (replacing the Changi Airport Extension)	10 January 2001		
Farrer Park	花拉公园	ஃபேரர் பார்க்	NE8	North East Line	20 June 2003		
Farrer Road	花拉路	ஃபேரர் சாலை	CC20	Circle Line	8 October 2011		
Fort Canning	福康宁	ஃபோர்ட் கெனிங்	DT20	Downtown Line	21 October 2017		
Gardens by the Bay	滨海湾花园	கரையோரப் பூந்தோட்டங்கள்	TE22	Thomson–East Coast Line	13 November 2022		
Geylang Bahru	芽笼峇鲁	கேலாங் பாரு	DT24	Downtown Line	21 October 2017		
Great World	大世界	கிரேட் வோர்ல்ட்	TE15	Thomson–East Coast Line	13 November 2022		
Gul Circle	卡尔圈	கல் சர்க்கல்	EW30	East–West Line; Cross Island Line (under planning)	18 June 2017		
HarbourFront ^	港湾	ஹார்பர்ஃபிரண்ட்	NE1 CC29	North East Line; Circle Line	20 June 2003	HarbourFront Bus Interchange; Vivocity; HarbourFront Tower Two; Singapore Cruise Centre; HarbourFront Passenger Terminal	
Havelock	合乐	ஹவ்லாக்	TE16	Thomson–East Coast Line	13 November 2022		
Haw Par Villa	虎豹别墅	ஹா பர் வில்லா	CC25	Circle Line	8 October 2011		
Hillview	山景	ஹில்வியூ	DT3	Downtown Line	27 December 2015		
Holland Village	荷兰村	ஹாலந்து வில்லேஜ்	CC21	Circle Line	8 October 2011		
Hougang	后港	ஹவ்காங்	NE14	North East Line; Cross Island Line (under construction)	20 June 2003	Hougang Bus Interchange	
Hume	谦道	ஹியூம்	DT4	Downtown Line	28 February 2025		
Jalan Besar	惹兰勿刹	ஜாலான் புசார்	DT22	Downtown Line	21 October 2017		
Joo Koon	裕群	ஜூ கூன்	EW29	East–West Line	28 February 2009	Joo Koon Bus Interchange	
Jurong East ^	裕廊东	ஜூரோங் கிழக்கு	NS1 EW24	Branch Line (10 March 1990 to 10 February 1996); North–South Line (Branch Line merger); East–West Line; Jurong Region Line (under construction)	5 November 1988	Jurong East Bus Interchange	
Kaki Bukit	加基武吉	காக்கி புக்கிட்	DT28	Downtown Line	21 October 2017		
Kallang	加冷	காலாங்	EW10	East–West Line	4 November 1989		
Katong Park	加东公园	காத்தோங் பார்க்	TE24	Thomson–East Coast Line	23 June 2024		
Kembangan	景万岸	கெம்பாங்கான்	EW6	East–West Line	4 November 1989		
Kent Ridge	肯特岗	கெண்ட் ரிஜ்	CC24	Circle Line; Jurong Region Line (planned)	8 October 2011		
Keppel	吉宝	கெப்பல்	CC30	Circle Line	12 July 2026		
Khatib	卡迪	காதிப்	NS14	North–South Line	20 December 1988		
King Albert Park	阿尔柏王园	கிங் ஆல்பர்ட் பார்க்	DT6	Downtown Line; Cross Island Line (under construction)	27 December 2015		
Kovan	高文	கோவன்	NE13	North East Line	20 June 2003		
Kranji	克兰芝	கிராஞ்சி	NS7	North–South Line	10 February 1996		
Labrador Park	拉柏多公园	லாப்ரடார் பூங்கா	CC27	Circle Line	8 October 2011		
Lakeside	湖畔	ஏரிக்கரை	EW26	East–West Line	5 November 1988		
Lavender	劳明达	லவண்டர்	EW11	East–West Line	4 November 1989		
Lentor	伦多	லென்ட்டோர்	TE5	Thomson–East Coast Line	28 August 2021		
Little India *	小印度	லிட்டில் இந்தியா	NE7 DT12	North East Line; Downtown Line	20 June 2003		
Lorong Chuan	罗弄泉	லோரோங் சுவான்	CC14	Circle Line	28 May 2009		
MacPherson *	麦波申	மெக்பர்சன்	CC10 DT26	Circle Line; Downtown Line	17 April 2010		
Marina Bay *	滨海湾	மரீனா பே	NS27 CC33 TE20	North–South Line; Circle Line; Thomson–East Coast Line	4 November 1989		
Marina South Pier ‡	滨海南码头	மரினா சவுத் பியர்	NS28	North–South Line	23 November 2014	Marina South Pier	
Marine Parade	马林百列	மரீன் பரேட்	TE26	Thomson–East Coast Line	23 June 2024		
Marine Terrace	马林台	மரீன் டெரஸ்	TE27	Thomson–East Coast Line	23 June 2024		
Marsiling	马西岭	மார்சிலிங்	NS8	North–South Line	10 February 1996		
Marymount	玛丽蒙	மேரிமவுண்ட்	CC16	Circle Line	28 May 2009		
Mattar	玛达	மாத்தார்	DT25	Downtown Line	21 October 2017		
Maxwell	麦士威	மெச்ஸ்வெல்	TE18	Thomson–East Coast Line	13 November 2022		
Mayflower	美华	மேஃபிளவர்	TE6	Thomson–East Coast Line	28 August 2021		
Mountbatten	蒙巴登	மவுண்ட்பேட்டன்	CC7	Circle Line	17 April 2010		
Napier	纳比雅	நேப்பியர்	TE12	Thomson–East Coast Line	13 November 2022		
Newton *	纽顿	நியூட்டன்	NS21 – DT11	North–South Line; Downtown Line	12 December 1987		
Nicoll Highway *	尼诰大道	நிக்கல் நெடுஞ்சாலை	CC5	Circle Line	17 April 2010		
Novena	诺维娜	நொவீனா	NS20	North–South Line	12 December 1987		
one-north	纬壹	ஒன்-நார்த்	CC23	Circle Line	8 October 2011		
Orchard *	乌节	ஆர்ச்சர்ட்	NS22 TE14	North–South Line; Thomson–East Coast Line	12 December 1987		
Orchard Boulevard	乌节大道	ஆர்ச்சர்ட் பொலிவார்ட்	TE13	Thomson–East Coast Line	13 November 2022		
Outram Park *	欧南园	ஊட்ரம் பார்க்	EW16 NE3 TE17	East–West Line; North East Line; Thomson–East Coast Line	12 December 1987		
Pasir Panjang	巴西班让	பாசிர் பாஞ்சாங்	CC26	Circle Line	8 October 2011		
Pasir Ris ‡	巴西立	பாசிர் ரிஸ்	EW1	East–West Line; Cross Island Line (under construction); Cross Island Line (under construction)	16 December 1989	Pasir Ris Bus Interchange	
Paya Lebar *	巴耶利峇	பாய லேபார்	EW8 CC9	East–West Line; Circle Line	4 November 1989		
Pioneer	先驱	பயனியர்	EW28	East–West Line	28 February 2009		
Potong Pasir	波东巴西	போத்தோங் பாசிர்	NE10	North East Line	20 June 2003		
Prince Edward Road	爱德华太子路	பிரின்ஸ் எட்வர்ட் ரோடு	CC32	Circle Line	12 July 2026	Shenton Way Bus Terminal	
Promenade *	宝门廊	புரொமனாட்	CC4 DT15	Circle Line; Downtown Line	17 April 2010		
Punggol	榜鹅	பொங்கோல்	NE17 PTC	North East Line; Cross Island Line (under construction)	20 June 2003	Punggol LRT station	
Punggol Coast ‡	榜鹅海岸	பொங்கோல் கோஸ்ட்	NE18	North East Line	10 December 2024	Punggol Coast Bus Interchange	
Queenstown	女皇镇	குவீன்ஸ்டவுன்	EW19	East–West Line	12 March 1988		
Raffles Place *	莱佛士坊	ராஃபிள்ஸ் பிளேஸ்	EW14 NS26	East–West Line; North–South Line	12 December 1987		
Redhill	红山	ரெட்ஹில்	EW18	East–West Line	12 March 1988		
Rochor	梧槽	ரோச்சோர்	DT13	Downtown Line	27 December 2015		
Sembawang	三巴旺	செம்பாவாங்	NS11	North–South Line	10 February 1996	Sembawang Bus Interchange	
Sengkang	盛港	செங்காங்	NE16 STC	North East Line	20 June 2003	Sengkang Bus Interchange Sengkang LRT station	
Serangoon *	实龙岗	சிராங்கூன்	NE12 CC13	North East Line; Circle Line	20 June 2003	Serangoon Bus Interchange	
Shenton Way	珊顿道	ஷென்ட்டன் வே	TE19	Thomson–East Coast Line	13 November 2022		
Siglap	实乞纳	சிக்லாப்	TE28	Thomson–East Coast Line	23 June 2024		
Simei	四美	ஸீமெய்	EW3	East–West Line	16 December 1989		
Sixth Avenue	第六道	சிக்ஸ்த் அவென்யூ	DT7	Downtown Line	27 December 2015		
Somerset	索美塞	சாமர்செட்	NS23	North–South Line	12 December 1987		
Springleaf	春叶	ஸ்பிரிங்லீஃவ்	TE4	Thomson–East Coast Line	28 August 2021		
Stadium ‡	体育场	ஸ்டேடியம்	CC6	Circle Line	17 April 2010		
Stevens *	史蒂芬	ஸ்டீவன்ஸ்	DT10 TE11	Downtown Line; Thomson–East Coast Line	27 December 2015		
Tai Seng	大成	தை செங்	CC11	Circle Line	17 April 2010		
Tampines *	淡滨尼	தெம்பனிஸ்	EW2 – DT32	East–West Line; Downtown Line	16 December 1989	Tampines Bus Interchange; Tampines Concourse Bus Interchange	
Tampines East	淡滨尼东	தெம்பினிஸ் ஈஸ்ட்	DT33	Downtown Line	21 October 2017		
Tampines West	淡滨尼西	தெம்பினிஸ் வெஸ்ட்	DT31	Downtown Line	21 October 2017		
Tan Kah Kee	陈嘉庚	டான் கா கீ	DT8	Downtown Line	27 December 2015		
Tanah Merah ^	丹那美拉	தானா மேரா	EW4 CG	East–West Line; East–West Line; Thomson–East Coast Line (replacing the Changi Airport Extension)	4 November 1989		
Tanjong Katong	丹戎加东	தஞ்சோங் காத்தோங்	TE25	Thomson–East Coast Line	23 June 2024		
Tanjong Pagar	丹戎巴葛	தஞ்சோங் பகார்	EW15	East–West Line	12 December 1987		
Tanjong Rhu	丹戎禺	தஞ்சோங் ரூ	TE23	Thomson–East Coast Line	23 June 2024		
Telok Ayer	直落亚逸	தெலுக் ஆயர்	DT18	Downtown Line	22 December 2013		
Telok Blangah	直落布兰雅	தெலுக் பிளாங்கா	CC28	Circle Line	8 October 2011		
Tiong Bahru	中峇鲁	தியோங் பாரு	EW17	East–West Line	12 March 1988		
Toa Payoh	大巴窑	தோ பாயோ	NS19	North–South Line	7 November 1987	Toa Payoh Bus Interchange	
Tuas Crescent	大士弯	துவாஸ் கிரசண்ட்	EW31	East–West Line	18 June 2017		
Tuas Link ‡	大士连路	துவாஸ் லிங்க்	EW33	East–West Line	18 June 2017	Tuas Bus Terminal	
Tuas West Road	大士西路	துவாஸ் வெஸ்ட் ரோடு	EW32	East–West Line	18 June 2017		
Ubi	乌美	உபி	DT27	Downtown Line	21 October 2017		
Upper Changi	樟宜上段	அப்பர் சாங்கி	DT34	Downtown Line	21 October 2017		
Upper Thomson	汤申路上段	அப்பர் தாம்சன்	TE8	Thomson–East Coast Line	28 August 2021		
Woodlands *	兀兰	ஊட்லண்ட்ஸ்	NS9 TE2	North–South Line; Thomson–East Coast Line	10 February 1996	Woodlands Bus Interchange; Woodlands Temporary Bus Interchange	
Woodlands North ‡	兀兰北	ஊட்லண்ட்ஸ் நார்த்	TE1	Thomson–East Coast Line	31 January 2020		
Woodlands South	兀兰南	ஊட்லண்ட்ஸ் சவுத்	TE3	Thomson–East Coast Line	31 January 2020		
Woodleigh	兀里	உட் லீ	NE11	North East Line	20 June 2011		
Yew Tee	油池	இயூ டீ	NS5	North–South Line	10 February 1996		
Yio Chu Kang	杨厝港	இயோ சூ காங்	NS15	North–South Line	7 November 1987	Yio Chu Kang Bus Interchange	
Yishun	义顺	யீஷூன்	NS13	North–South Line	20 December 1988	Yishun Bus Interchange	

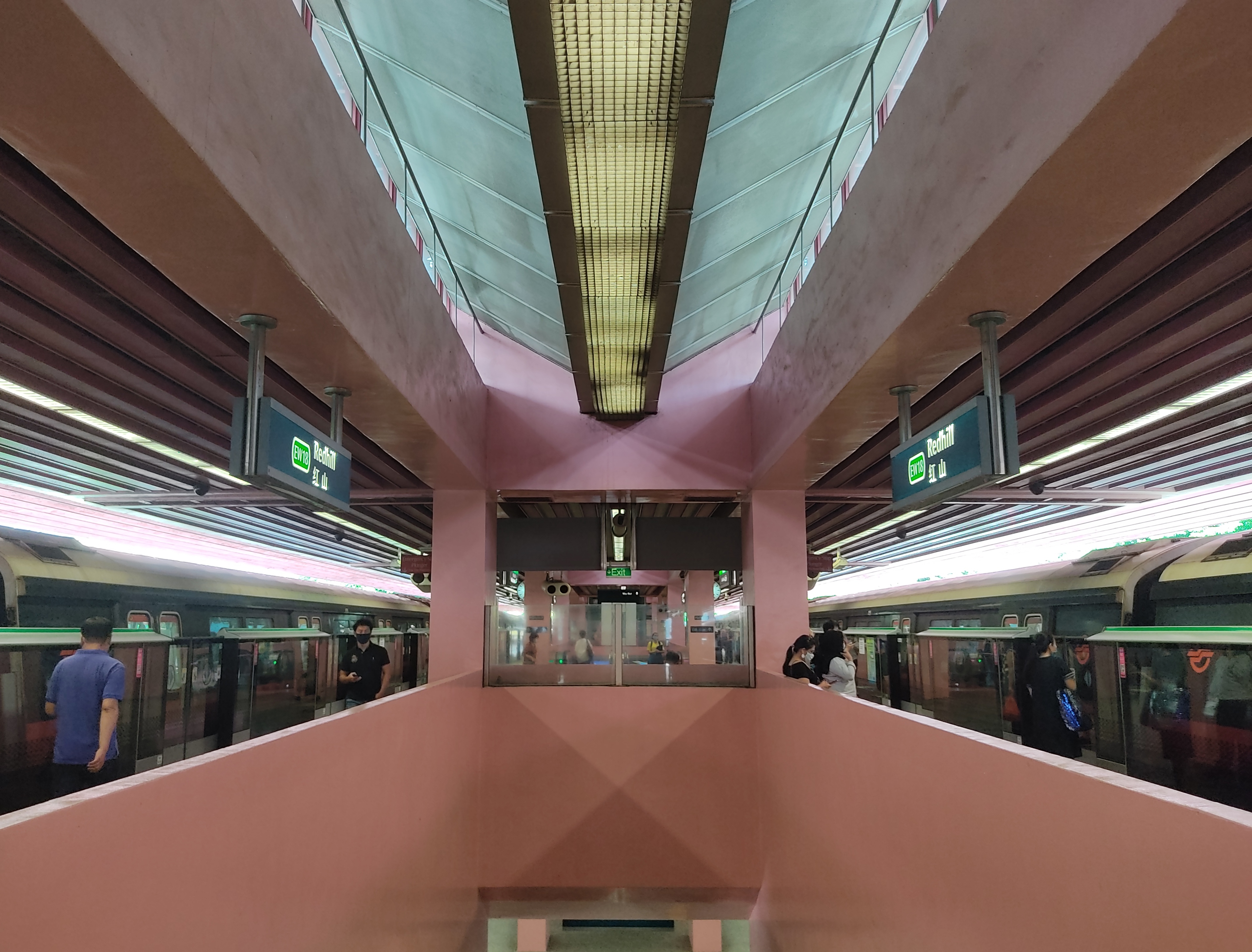
Redhill's platforms

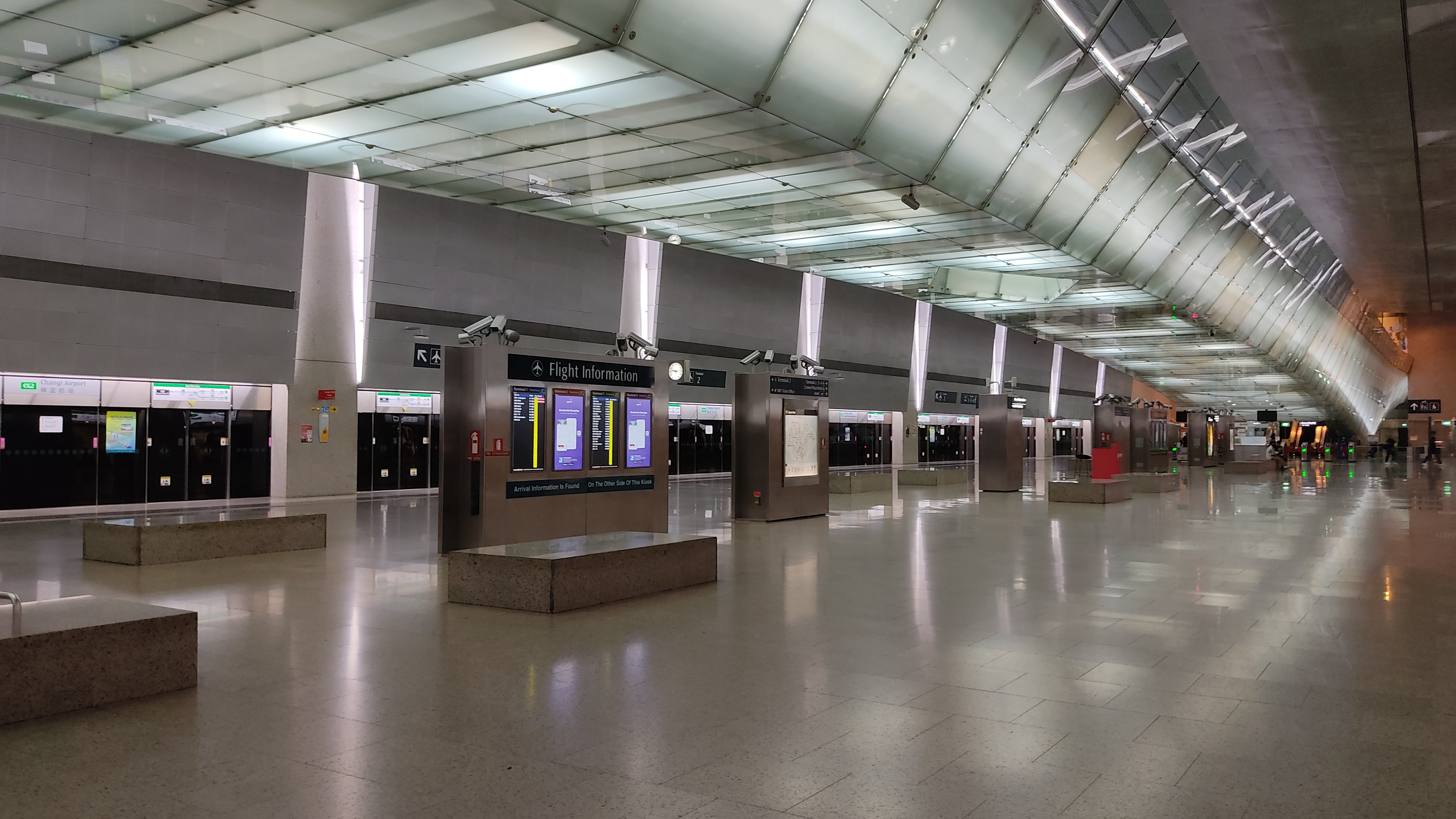
Changi Airport's platforms

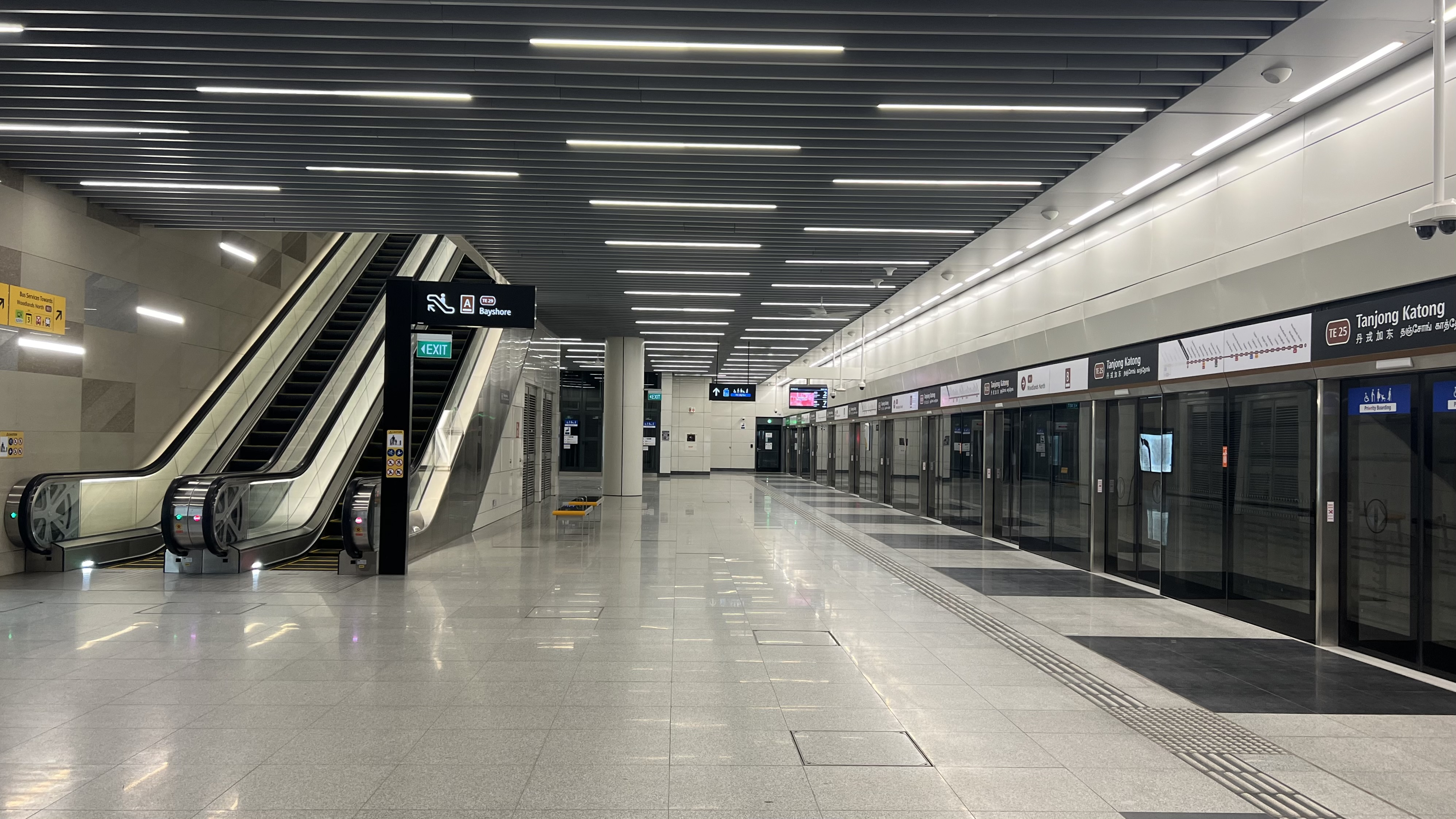
One of Tanjong Katong's platforms

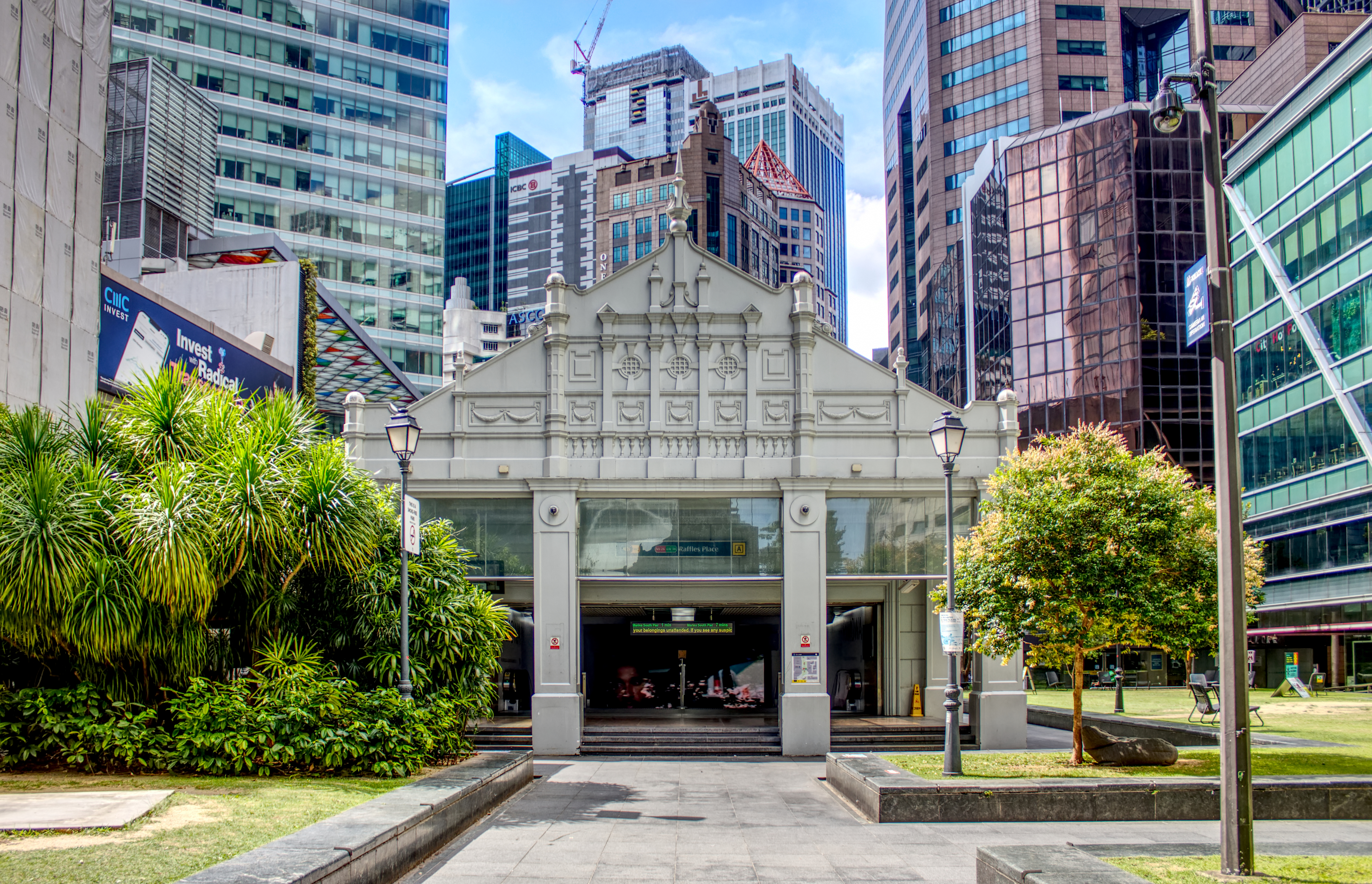
One of Raffles Place's entrances

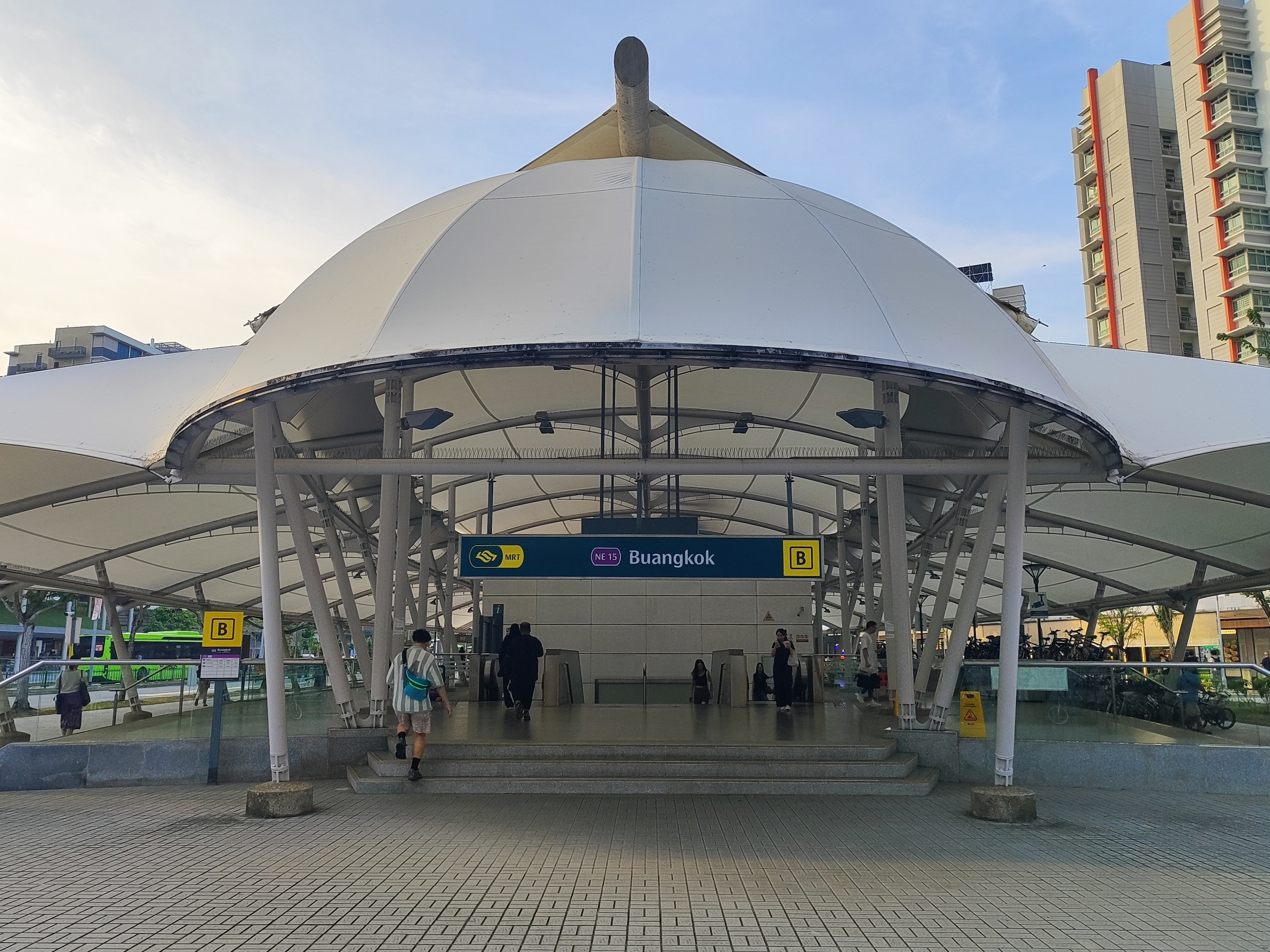
One of Buangkok's entrances

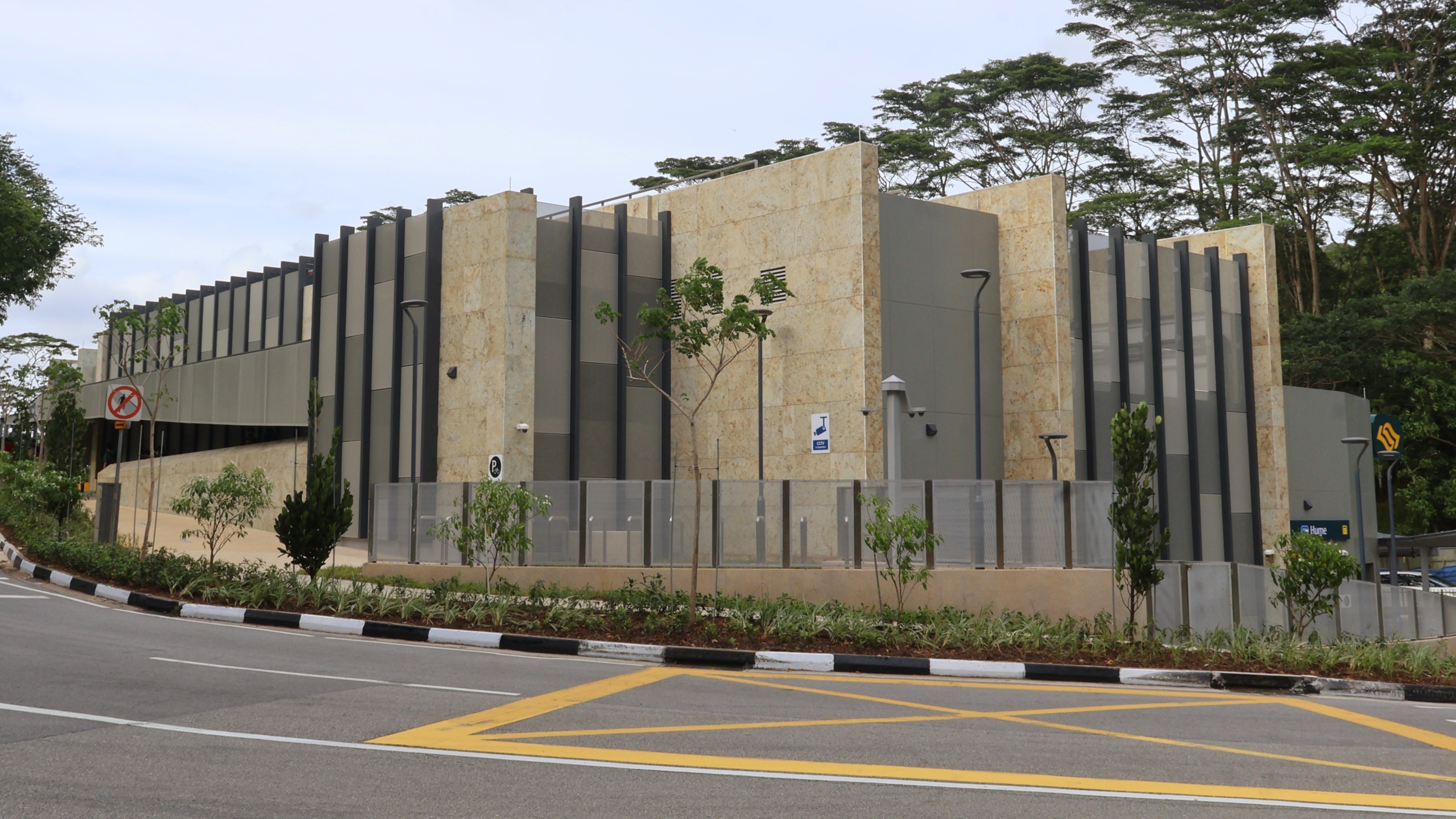
One of Hume's entrances

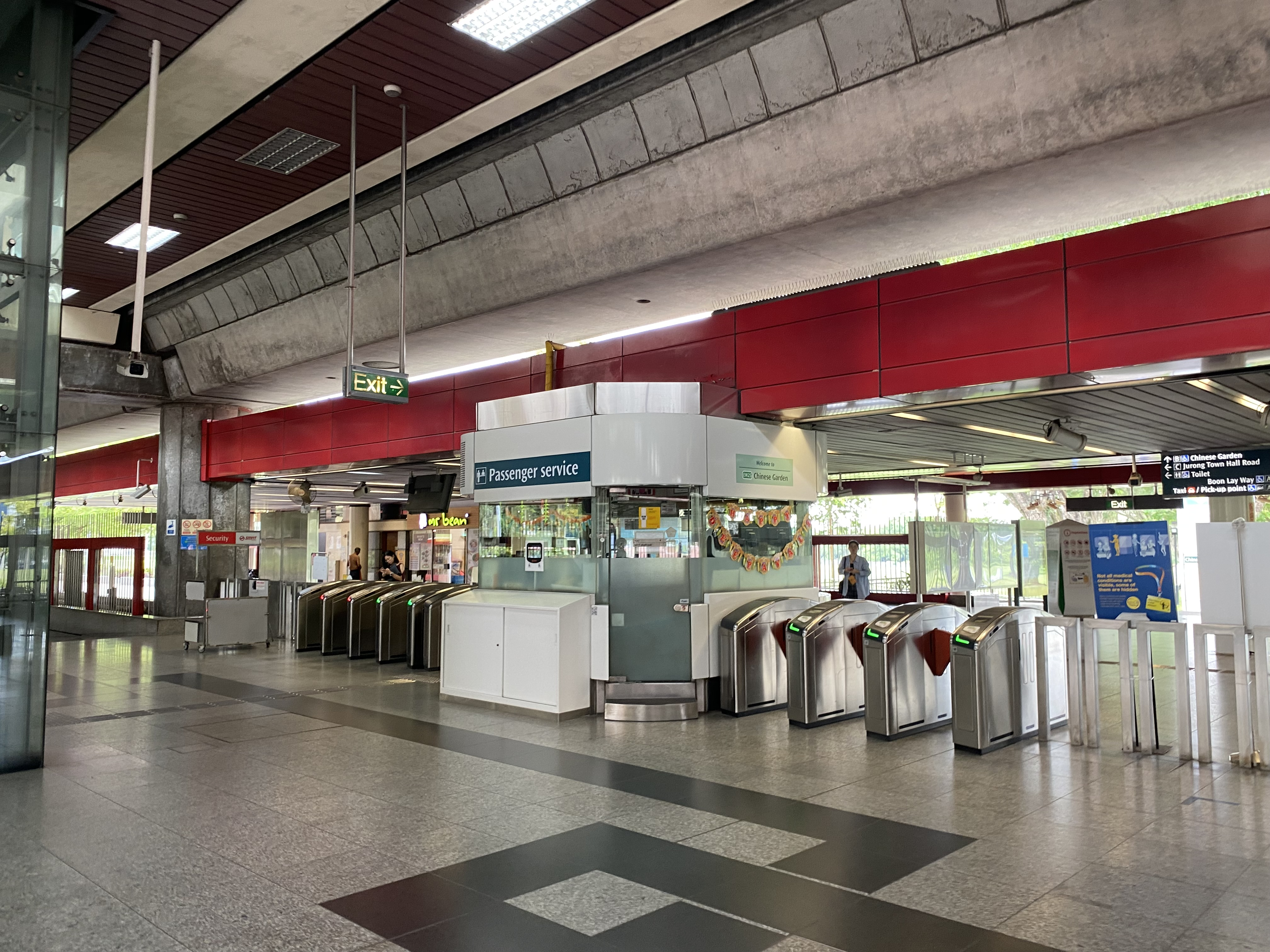
Chinese Garden's concourse

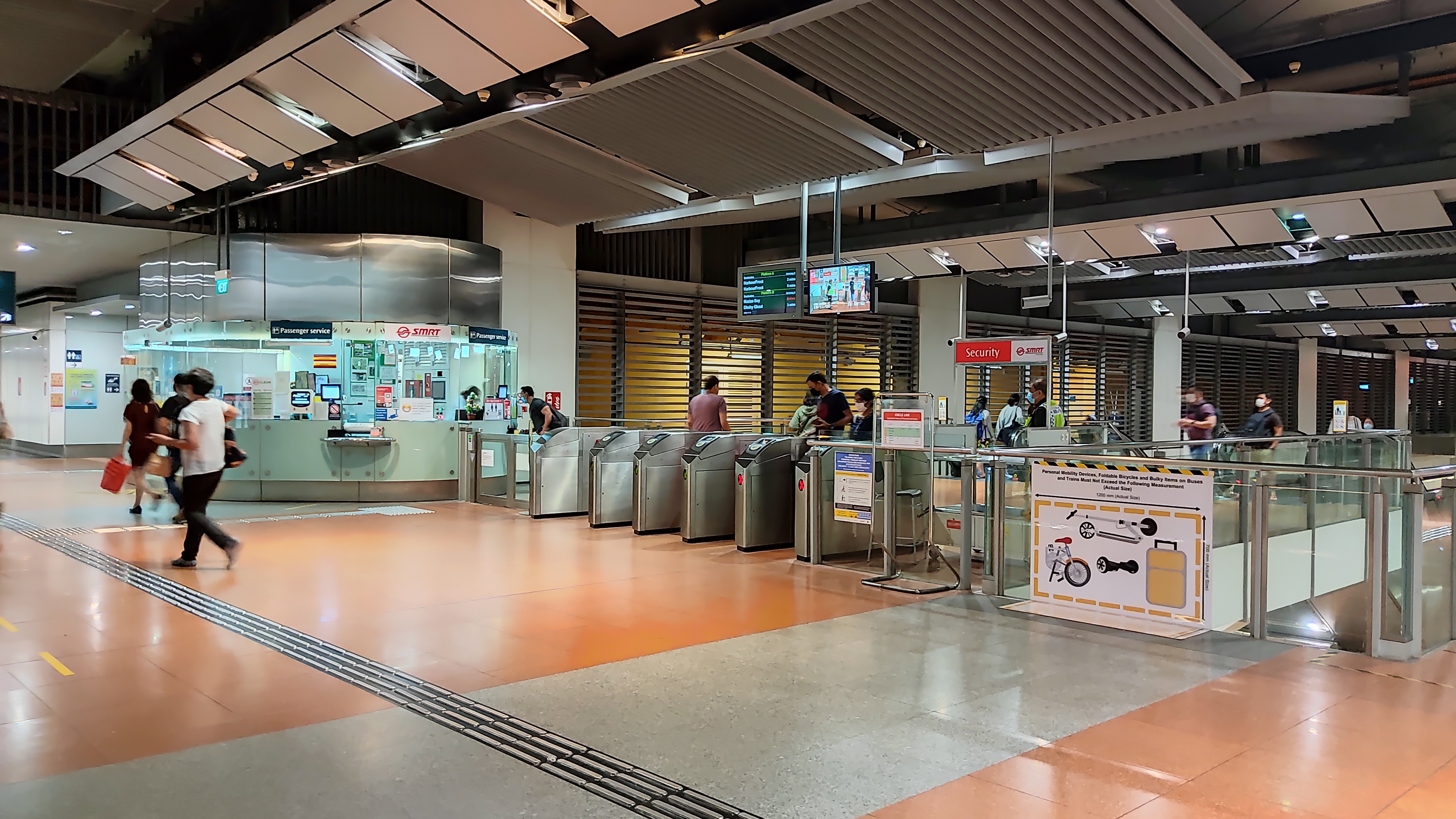
Marymount's concourse

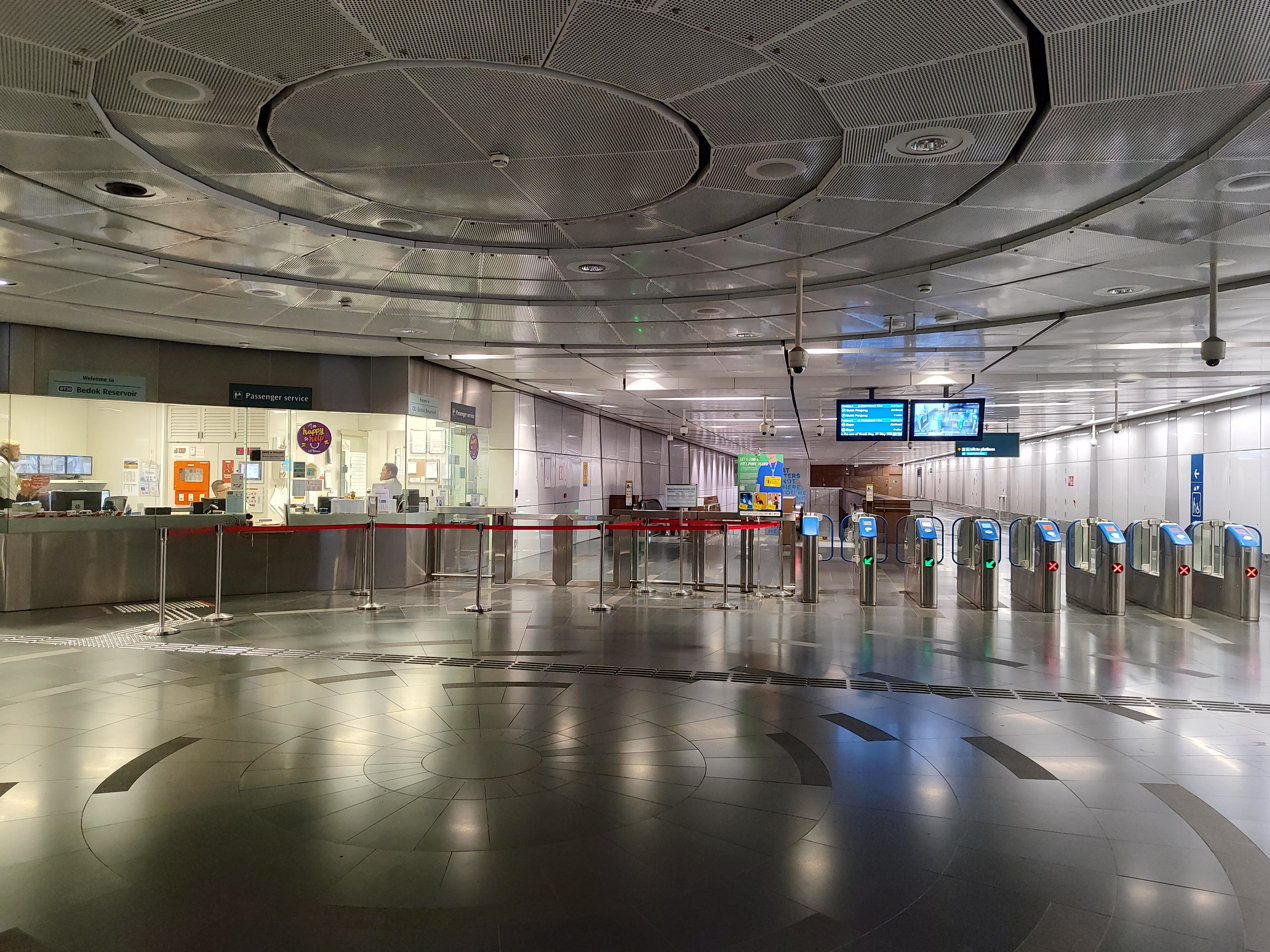
Bedok Reservoir's concourse

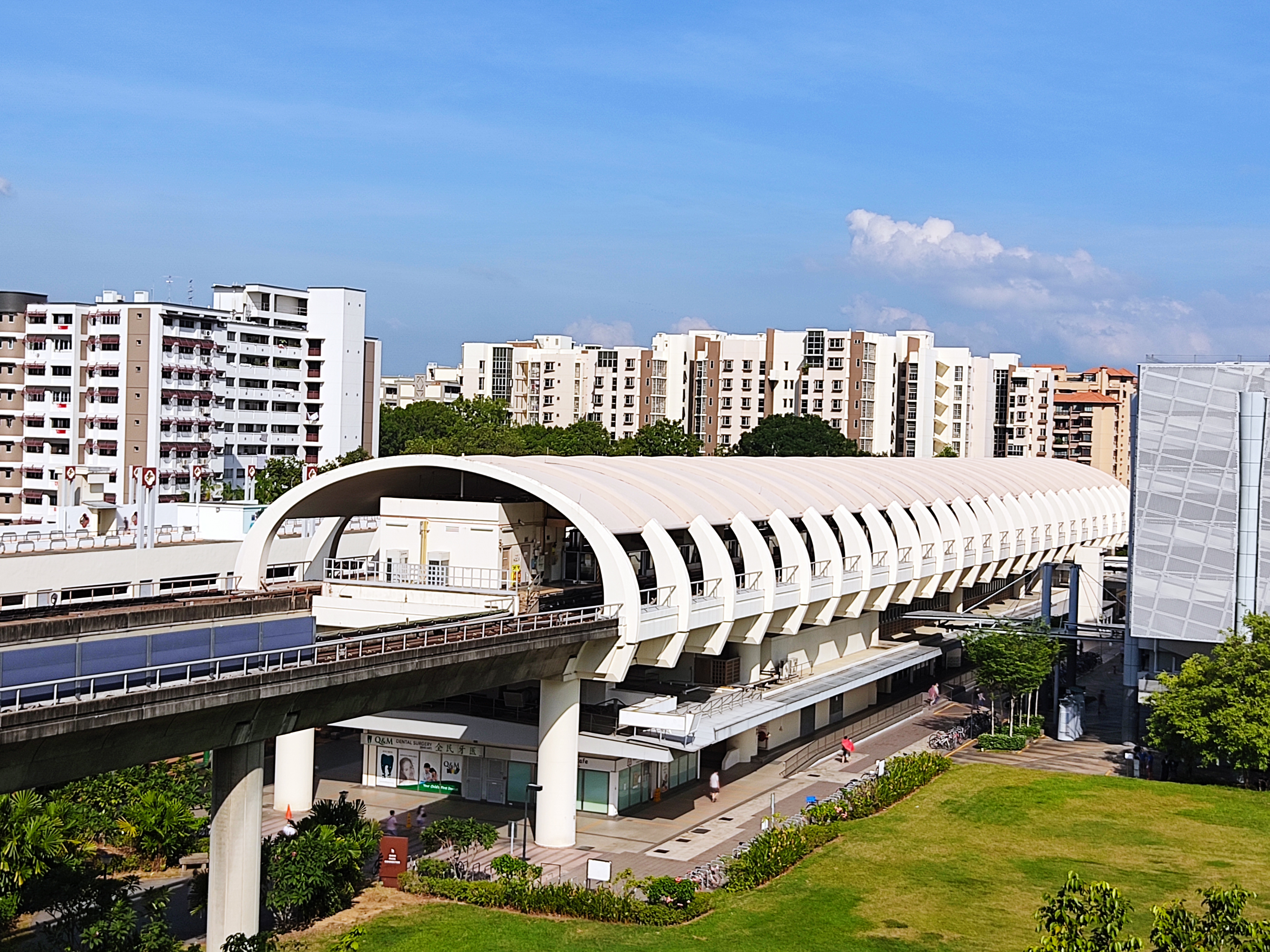
Simei's roof

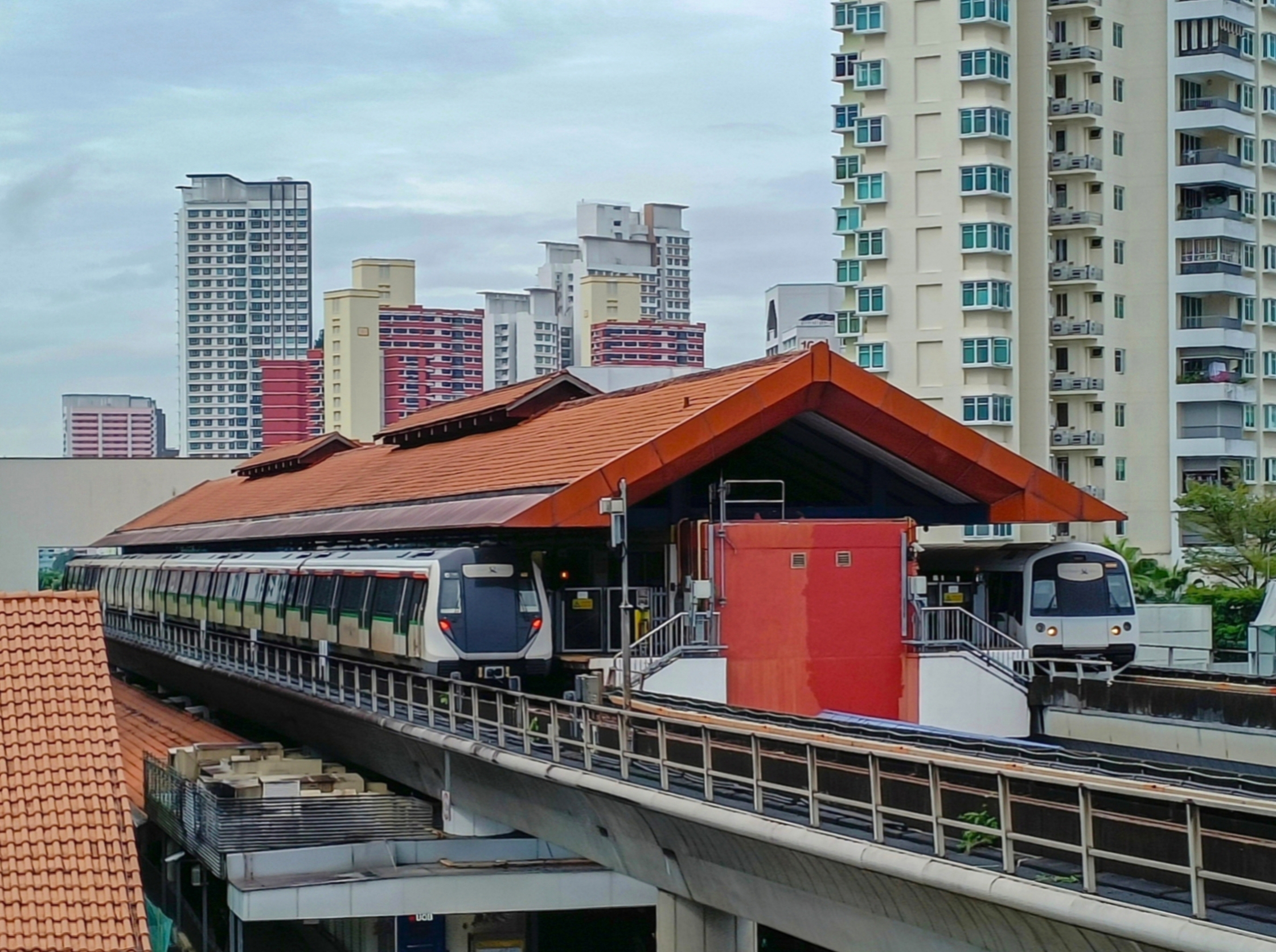
Bukit Batok's roof

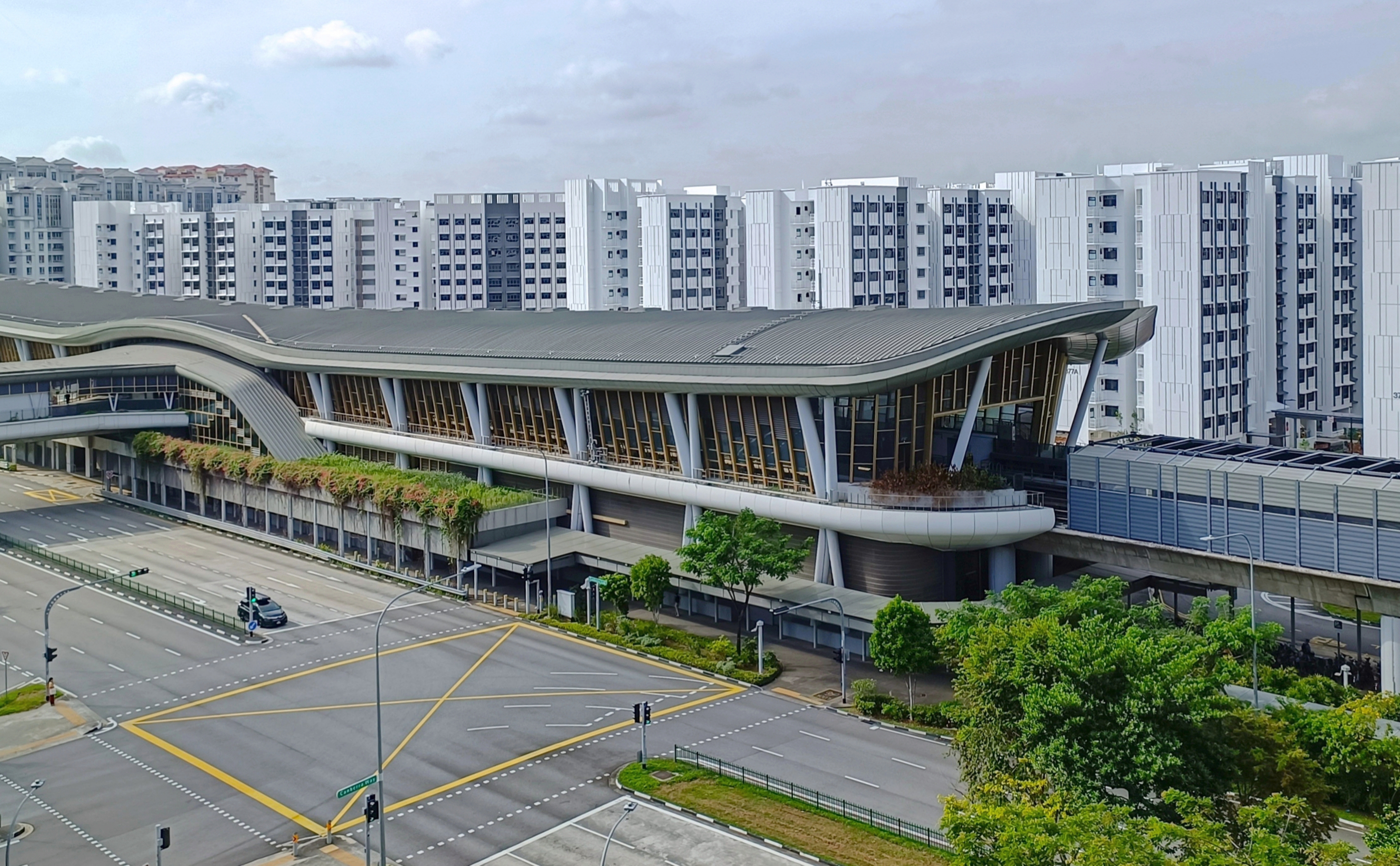
Canberra's roof

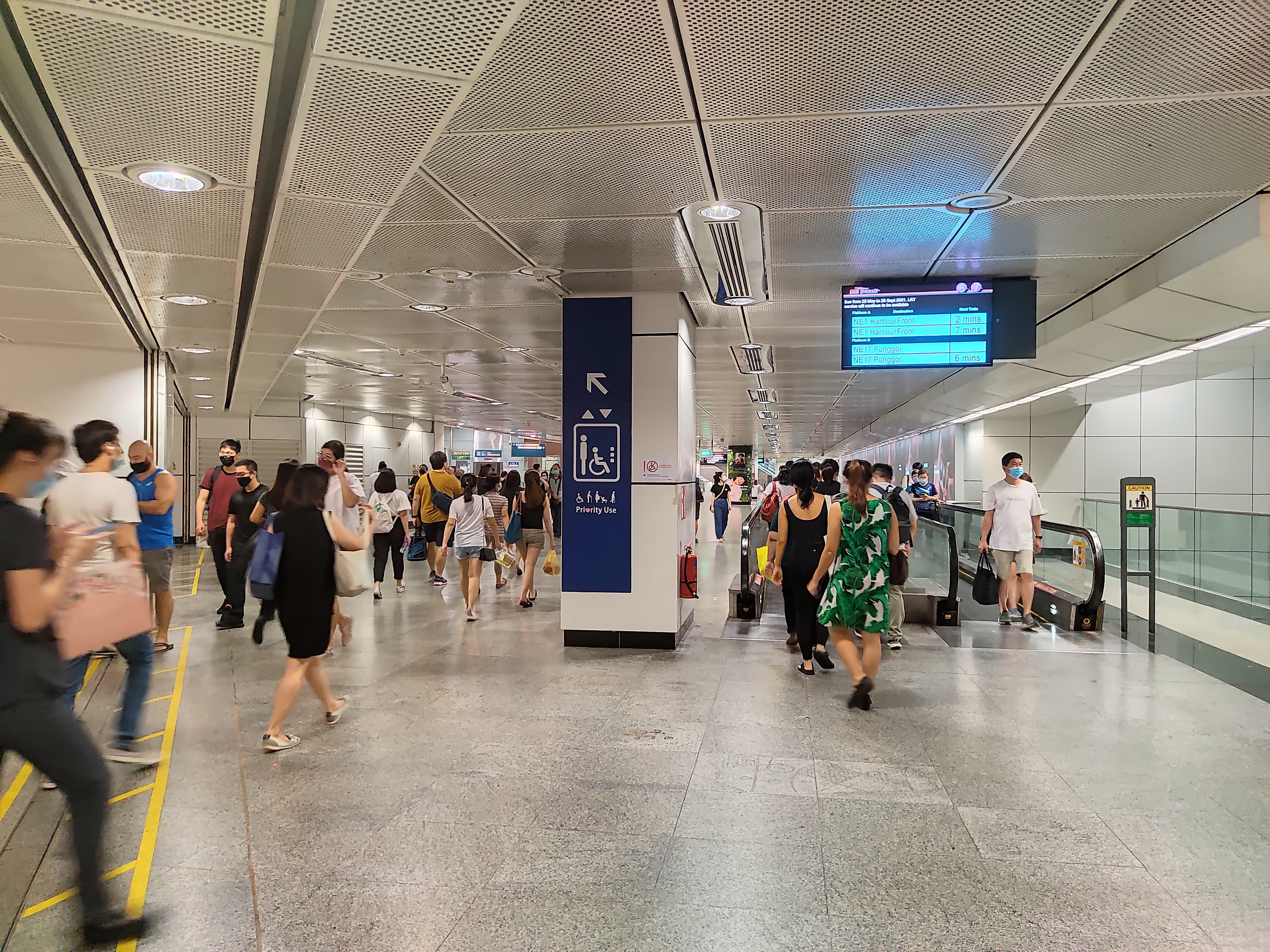
A linkway in Dhoby Ghaut

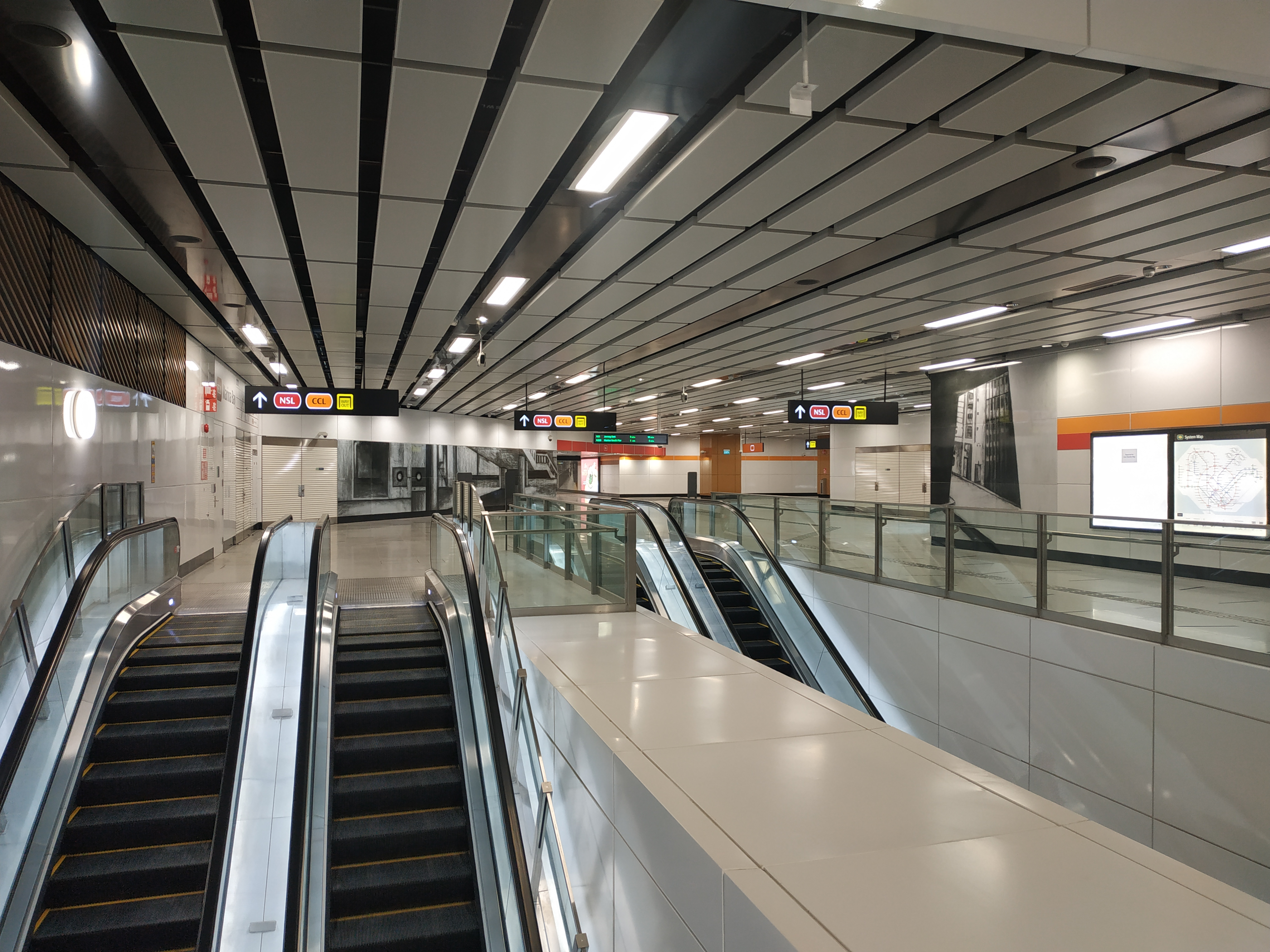
A linkway in Marina Bay

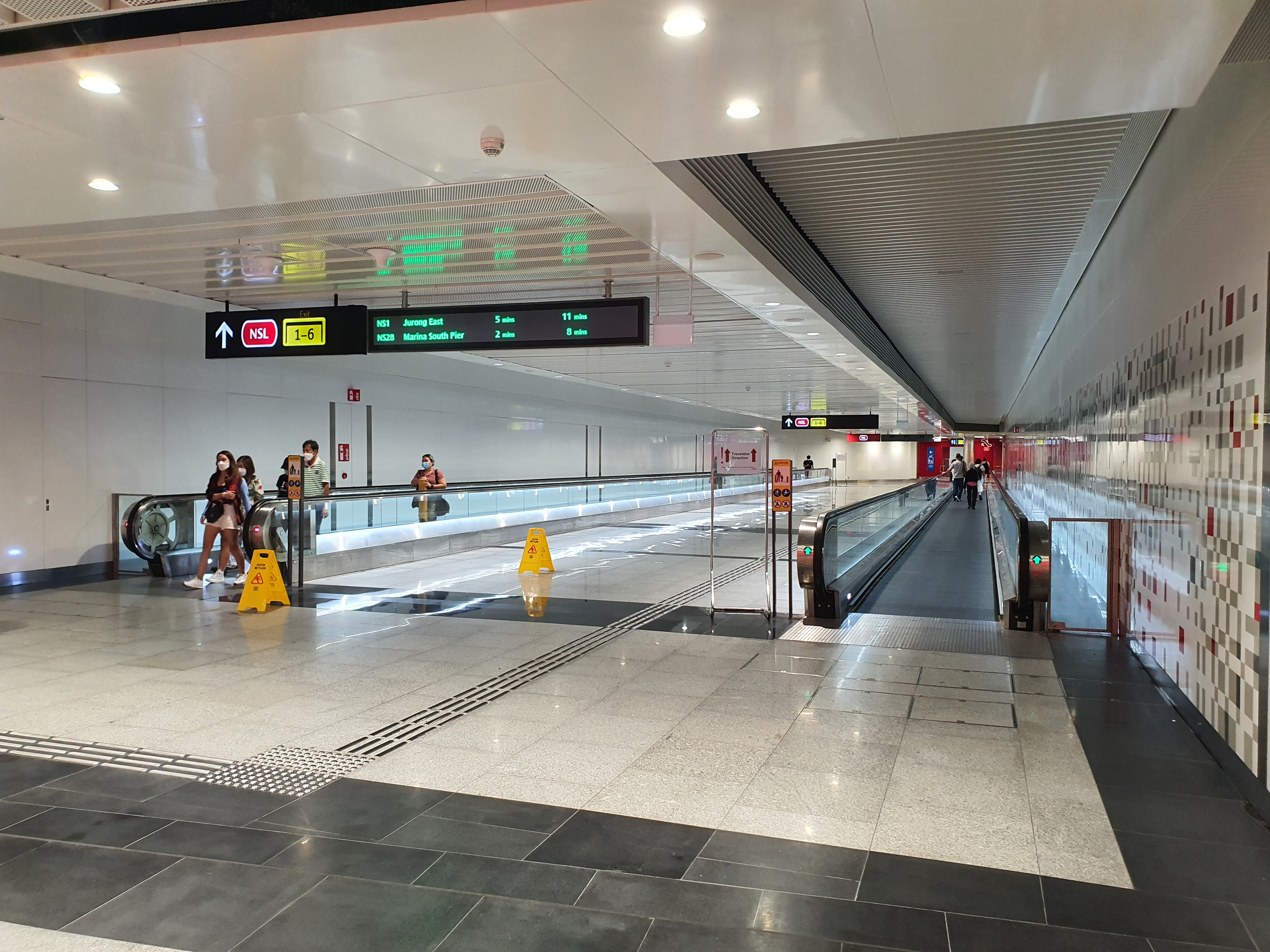
A linkway in Orchard

=== Non-operational ===
Non-operational stations with their Chinese, Malay, and Tamil names, along with their station code, line services, and conditions for opening
Station name			Station code (Note: Station codes in this column are displayed as they are in official government publications and news articles.)	Line	Condition for opening	Ref
English	Chinese	Tamil	Station code	Line	Condition for opening	Ref
Bukit Brown	武吉布朗	N/A	CC18	Circle Line	Sufficient demand for the station	
Marina South	滨海南	மரீனா சவுத்	TE21	Thomson–East Coast Line	In tandem with developments in Marina South	
Mount Pleasant	快乐山	மவுண்ட் பிளசண்ட்	TE10	Thomson–East Coast Line	In tandem with developments in Mount Pleasant	
Tagore	TBA			Thomson–East Coast Line	TBA	

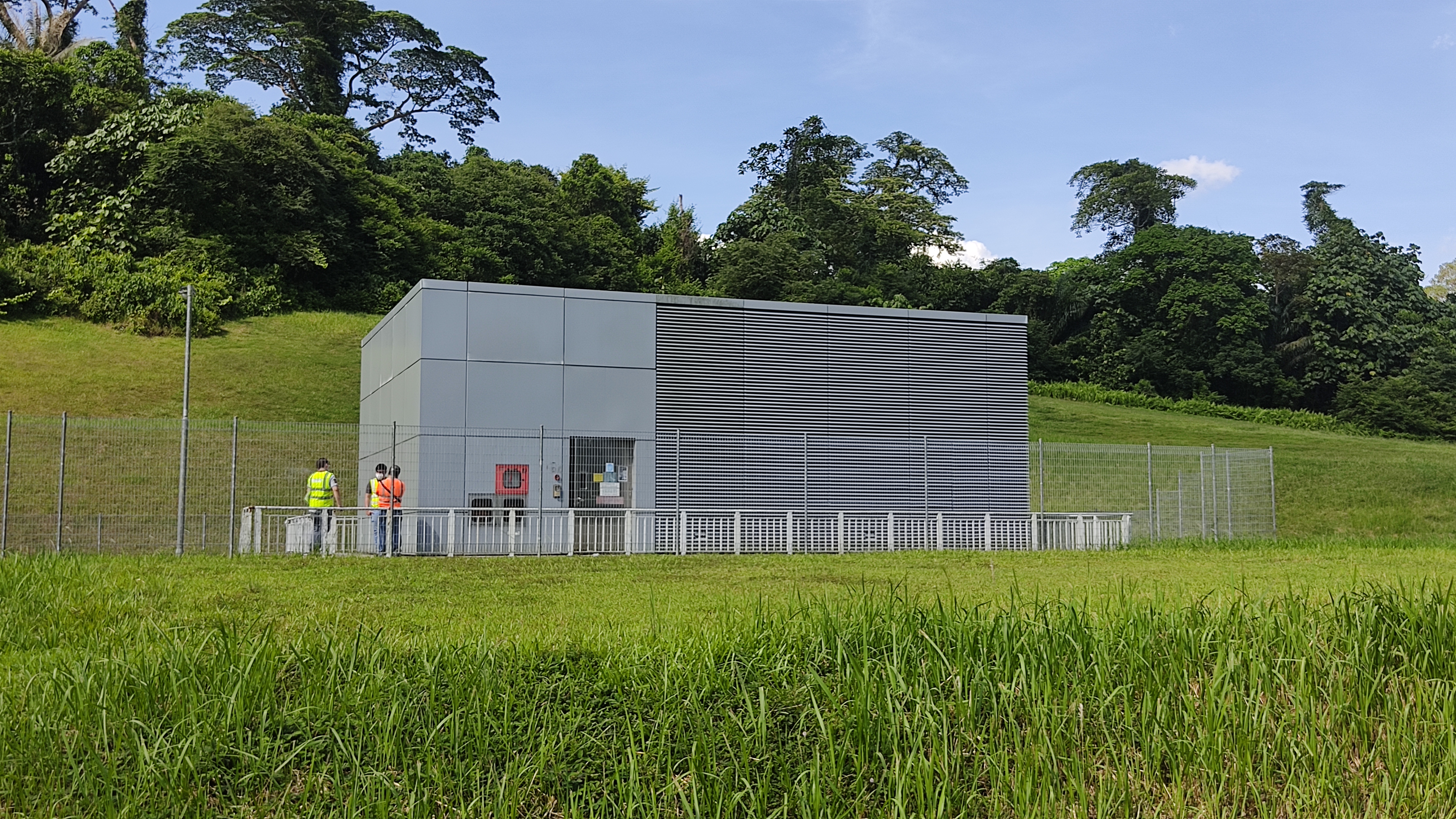
Bukit Brown's vent shaft

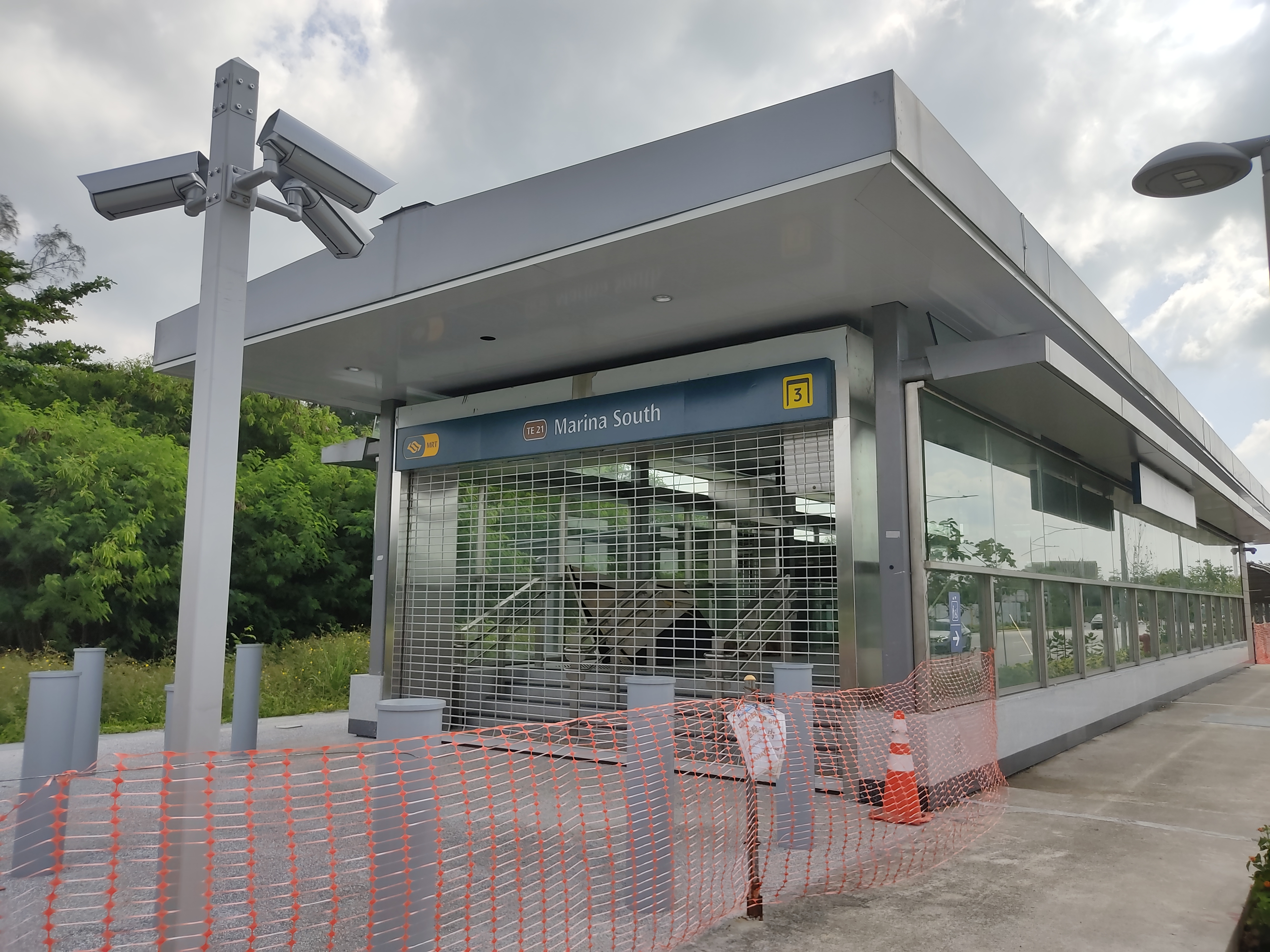
One of Marina South's entrances

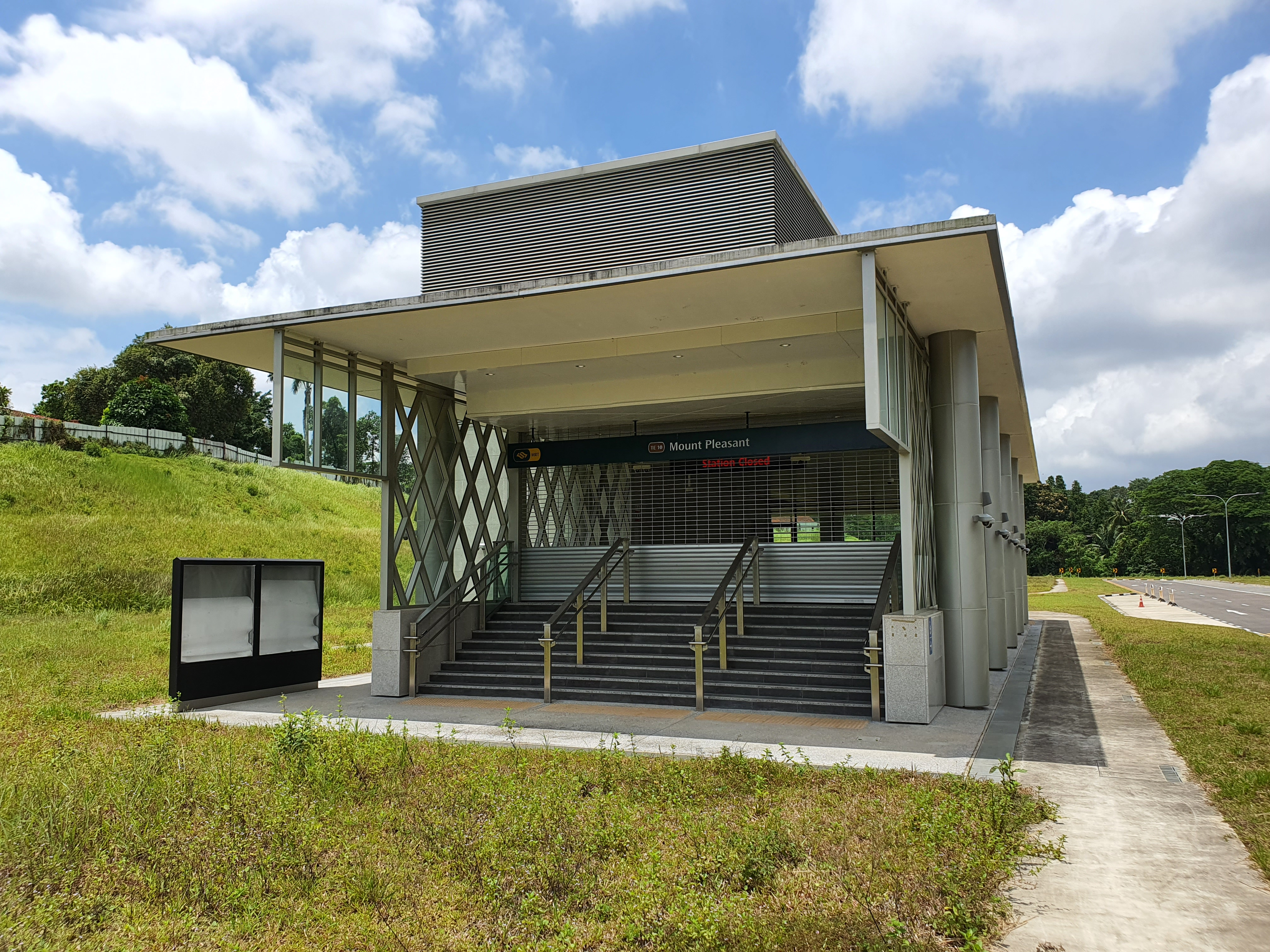
One of Mount Pleasant's entrances

=== Under construction ===
Under-construction stations with their Chinese, Malay, and Tamil names, along with their station code, line services, expected opening date, and transport connections
Station name			Station code	Line	Expected date of opening (Note: This column refers to the station's expected opening date. It does not include dates for future lines, renovations, or platform additions, which can be found in the articles for the individual stations.)	Connections	Ref
English	Chinese	Tamil	Station code	Line	Expected date of opening	Connections	Ref
Aviation Park ‡	航空园	ஏவியேஷன் பார்க்	CR2	Cross Island Line	2030		
Bahar Junction *	峇哈路口	N/A	JS7	Jurong Region Line	Mid-2028		
Bedok South	勿洛南	பிடோக் சவுத்	TE30	Thomson–East Coast Line	26 December 2026		
Bukit Batok West	武吉巴督西	N/A	JE3	Jurong Region Line	2028		
Choa Chu Kang West	蔡厝港西	N/A	JS2	Jurong Region Line	Mid-2028		
Corporation	企业	N/A	JS5	Jurong Region Line	Mid-2028		
Defu	德福	டெஃபு	CR7	Cross Island Line	2030		
Elias	伊莱雅	இலியாஸ்	CP2	Cross Island Line Punggol Extension	2032		
Enterprise	事业	N/A	JS9	Jurong Region Line	2029		
Founders' Memorial	建国先贤纪念园	தேச நிறுவனர்கள்	TE22A	Thomson–East Coast Line	End of 2028		
Gek Poh	玉宝	N/A	JW1	Jurong Region Line	Mid-2028		
Hong Kah	丰加	N/A	JS4	Jurong Region Line	Mid-2028		
Jurong Hill	裕廊山	N/A	JS11	Jurong Region Line	2029		
Jurong Lake District	裕廊湖区	ஜூரோங் லேக் வட்டாரம்	CR19	Cross Island Line	2032		
Jurong Pier ^	裕廊渡头	ஜூரோங் பியர்	JS12 CR21	Jurong Region Line; Cross Island Line (under planning)	2029		
Jurong Town Hall	裕廊镇大会堂	N/A	JE6	Jurong Region Line	2028		
Jurong West	裕廊西	N/A	JS6	Jurong Region Line	Mid-2028		
Loyang	罗央	லோயாங்	CR3	Cross Island Line	2030		
Maju	马裕	மாஜு	CR16	Cross Island Line	2032		
Nanyang Crescent	南洋弯	N/A	JW4	Jurong Region Line	2029		
Nanyang Gateway	南洋门	N/A	JW3	Jurong Region Line	2029		
Pandan Reservoir ‡	班丹蓄水池	N/A	JE7	Jurong Region Line	2028		
Pasir Ris East	巴西立东	பாசிர் ரிஸ் ஈஸ்ட்	CR4	Cross Island Line	2030		
Peng Kang Hill ‡	秉光山	N/A	JW5	Jurong Region Line	2029		
Riviera	里维拉	ரிவியாரா	CP3 – PE4	Cross Island Line Punggol Extension	2032	Riviera LRT station	
Serangoon North	实龙岗北	சிராங்கூன் நார்த்	CR9	Cross Island Line	2030		
Sungei Bedok ^	双溪勿洛	சுங்கை பிடோக்	DT37 TE31	Downtown Line; Thomson–East Coast Line	26 December 2026		
Tampines North	淡滨尼北	தெம்பினிஸ் நார்த்	CR6	Cross Island Line	2030		
Tavistock	达维士笃	தெவிஸ்தொக்	CR10	Cross Island Line	2030		
Tawas	大华士	N/A	JW2	Jurong Region Line	Mid-2028		
Teck Ghee	德义	டெக் கீ	CR12	Cross Island Line	2030		
Tengah	登加	N/A	JS3	Jurong Region Line	Mid-2028		
Tengah Park	登加公园	N/A	JE2	Jurong Region Line	2028		
Tengah Plantation	登加种植	N/A	JE1	Jurong Region Line	2028		
Toh Guan	卓源	N/A	JE4	Jurong Region Line	2028		
Tukang	都康	N/A	JS10	Jurong Region Line	2029		
Turf City	马城	டர்ஃப் சிட்டி	CR14	Cross Island Line	2032		
West Coast ^	西海岸	வெஸ்ட் கோஸ்ட்	CR18	Jurong Region Line (planned); Cross Island Line	2032		
Xilin	锡林	ஸீலின்	DT36	Downtown Line	26 December 2026		

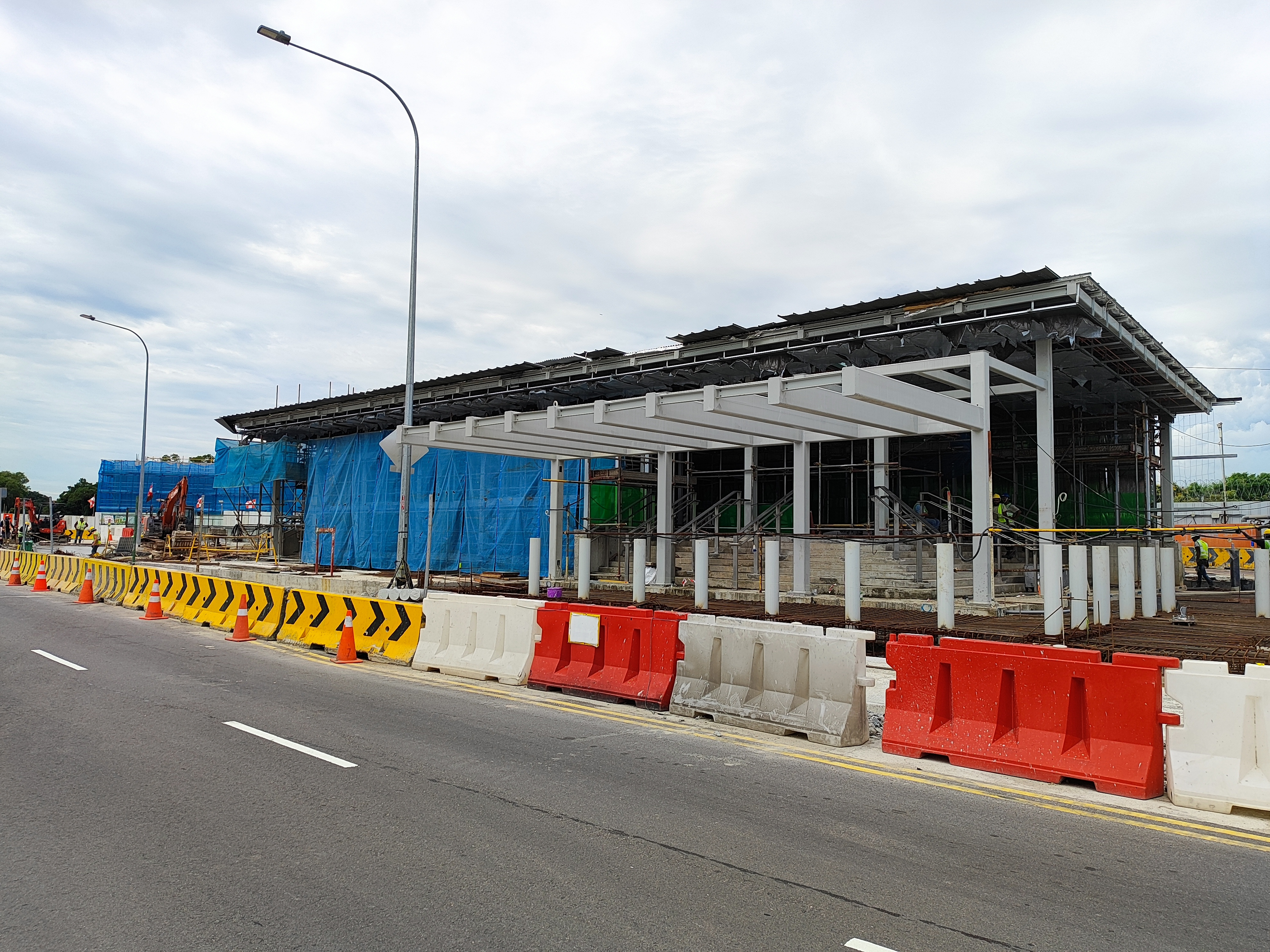
Sungei Bedok's construction site

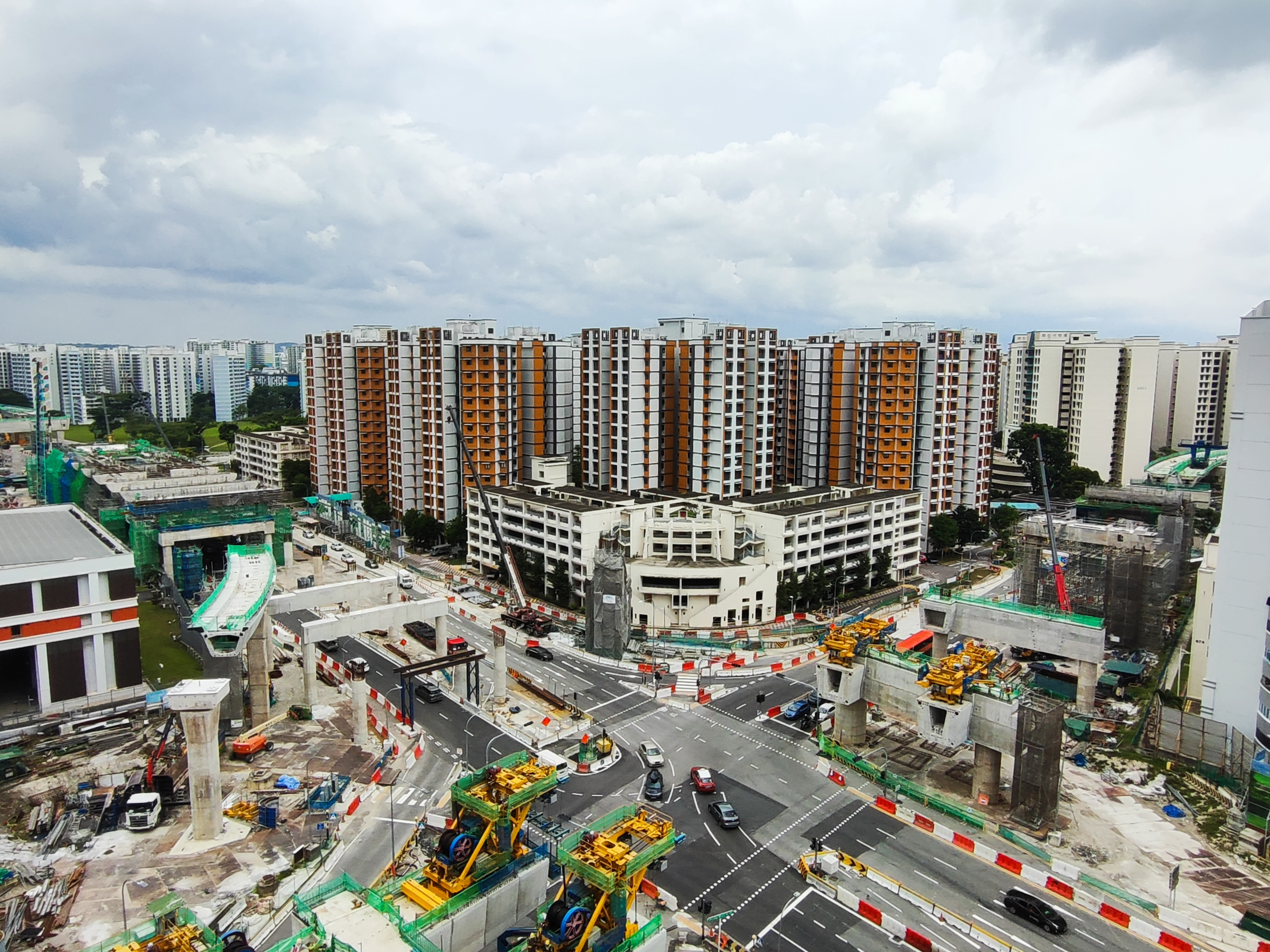
Bahar Junction's construction site

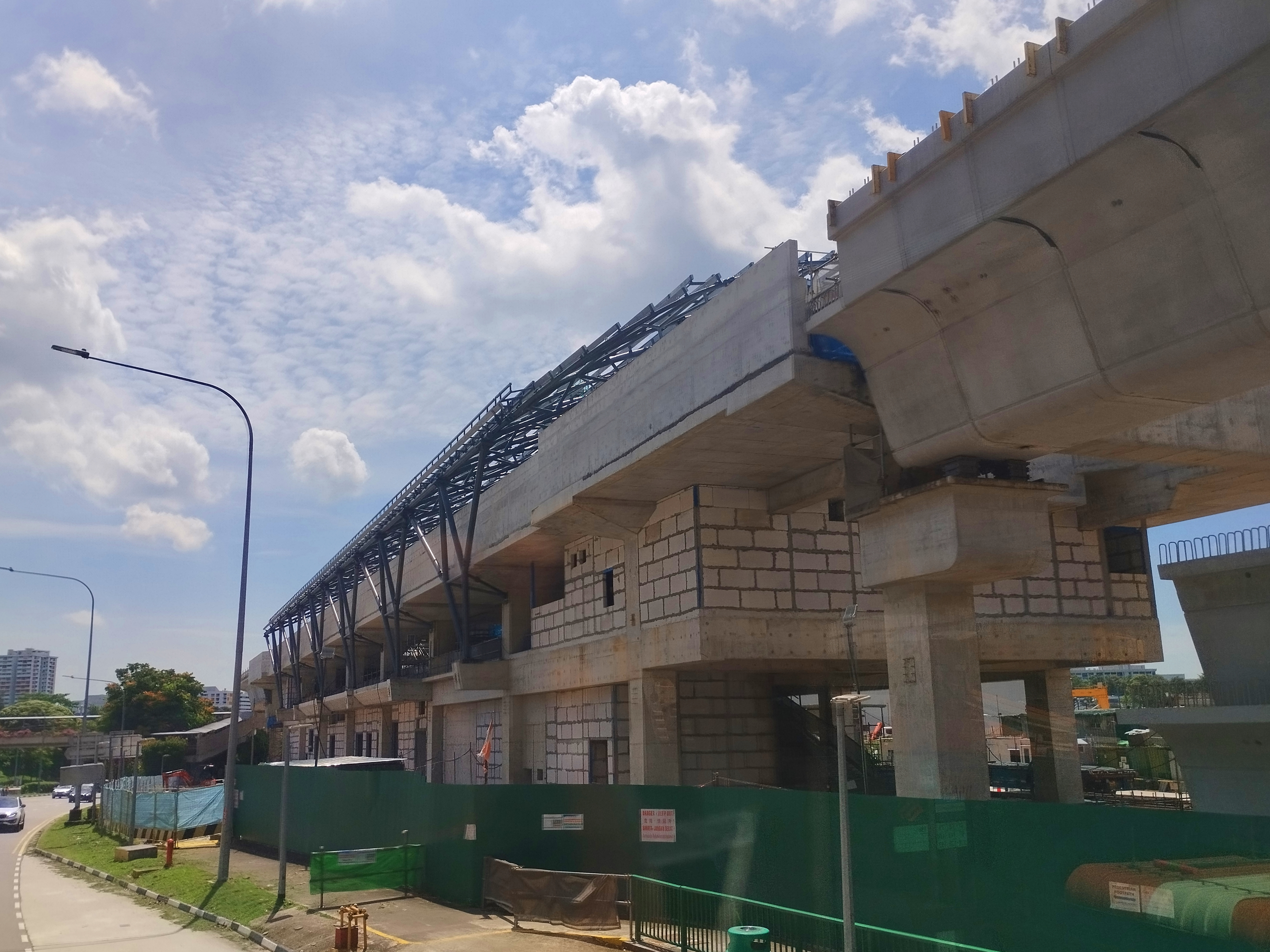
Jurong Town Hall's construction site

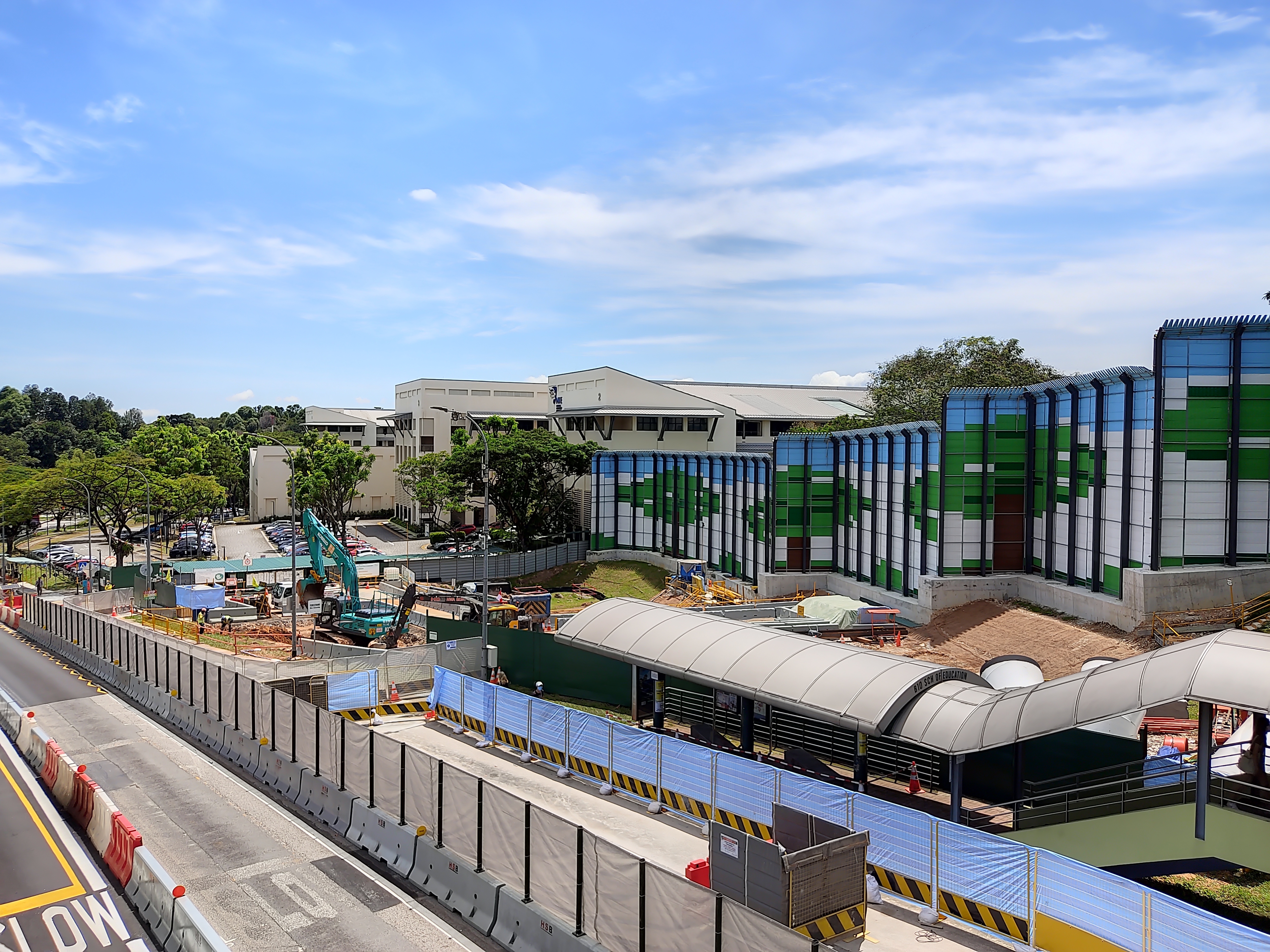
Nanyang Crescent's construction site

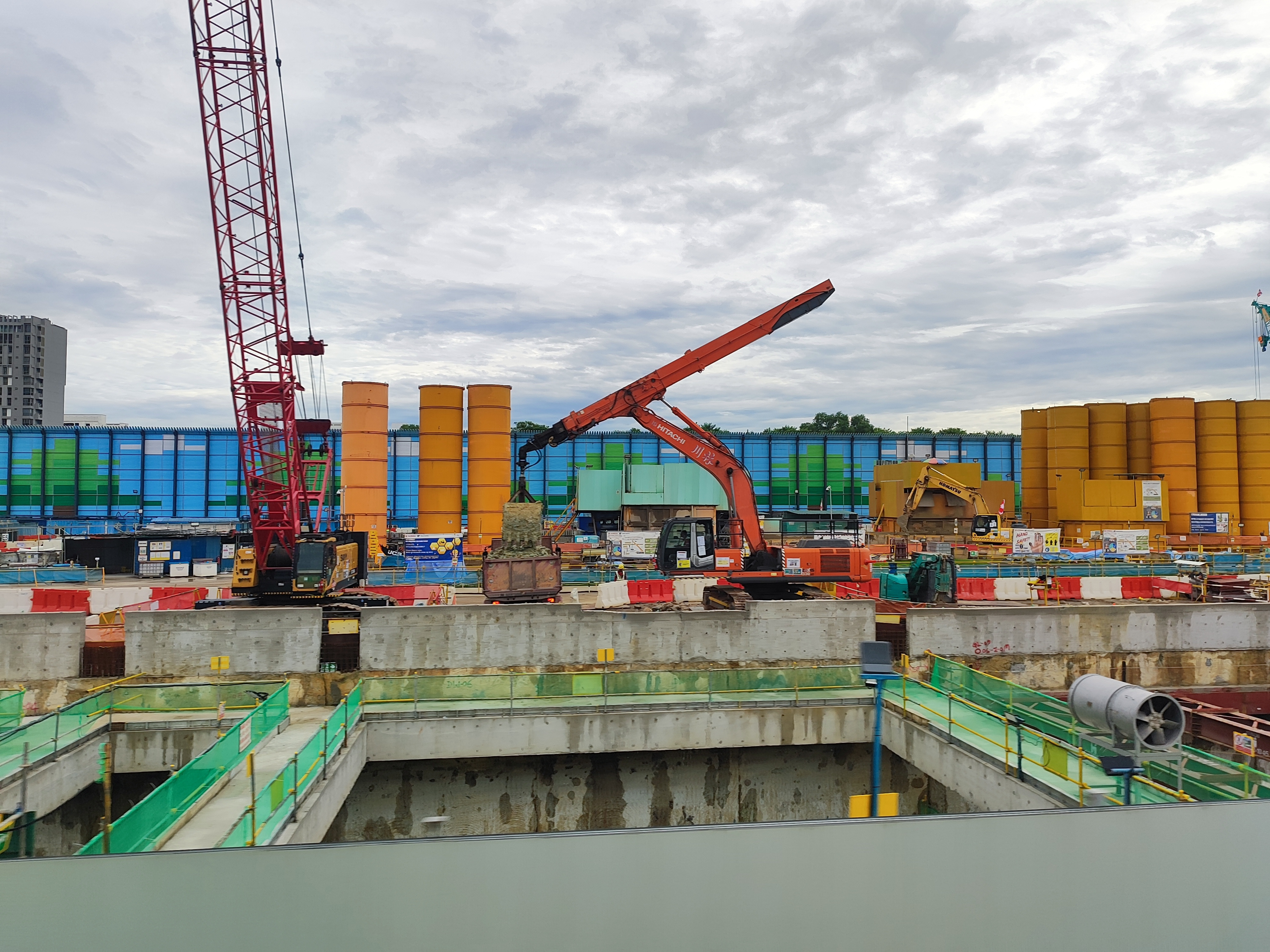
Defu's construction site

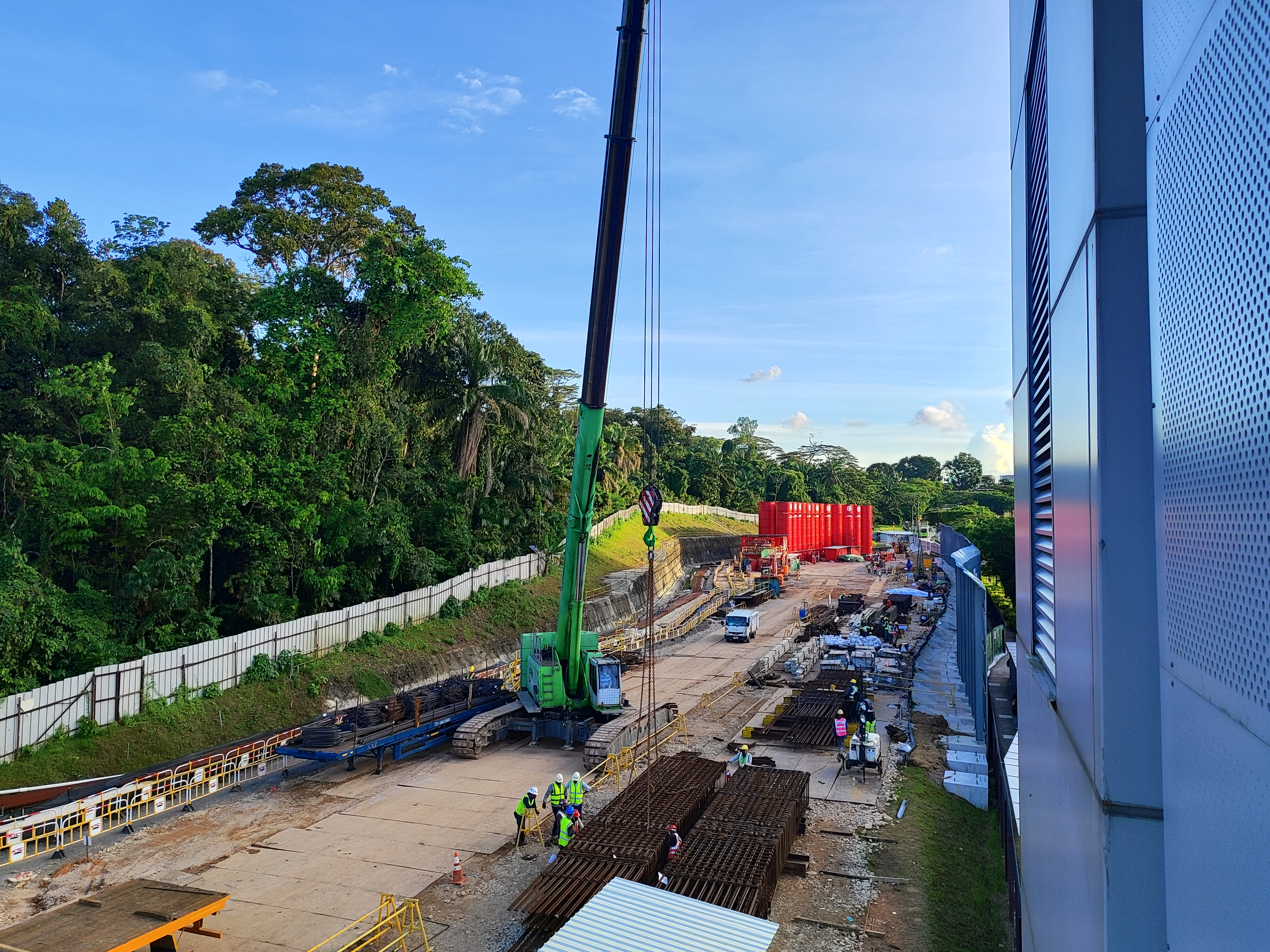
Maju's construction site

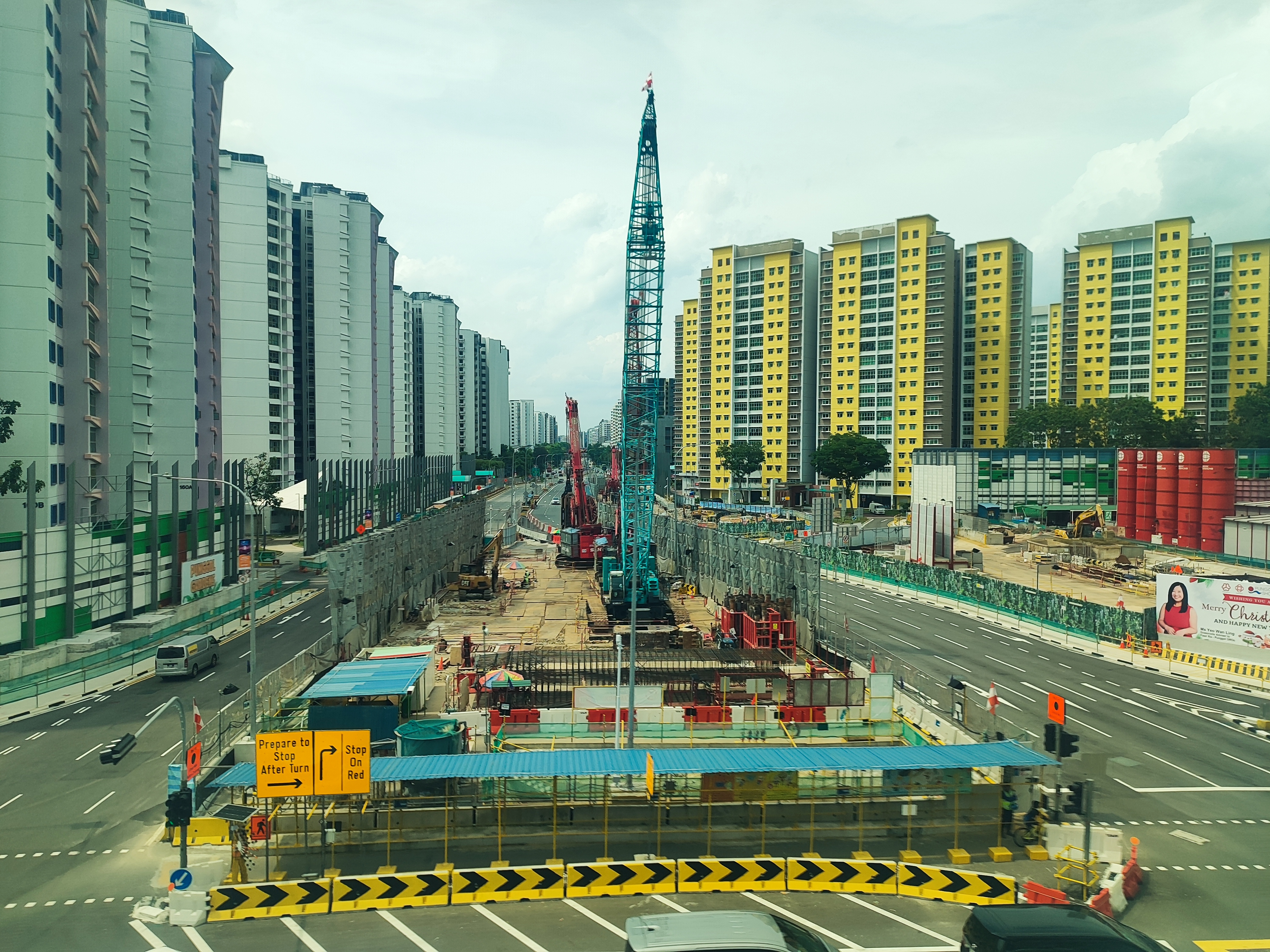
Riviera's construction site

=== Planned ===
Planned stations with their Chinese, Malay, and Tamil names, along with their station code, line services, expected opening date, and transport connections
Station name			Station code	Line	Expected date of opening	Connections	Ref
English	Chinese	Tamil	Station code	Line	Expected date of opening	Connections	Ref
Brickland	红砖	பிரிக்லேன்ட்	NS3A	North–South Line	2034		
Changi Terminal 5 ^	樟宜第五搭客大厦	சாங்கி ஐந்தாம் முனையம்	TE32 CR1	Thomson–East Coast Line; Cross Island Line	Mid-2030s	Changi Airport Terminal 5	
CR20 †	TBA	TBA	CR20	Cross Island Line	Late-2030s		
CR22 †	TBA	TBA	CR22	Cross Island Line	Late-2030s		
DE1 †	TBA	TBA	DE1	Downtown Line	2035		
JS2A †	TBA	TBA	JS2A	Jurong Region Line	Mid-2030s		
NE2 †	TBA	TBA	NE2	North East Line	TBA		
Sungei Kadut ^	TBA	TBA	NS6 DE2	North–South Line; Downtown Line	2035		

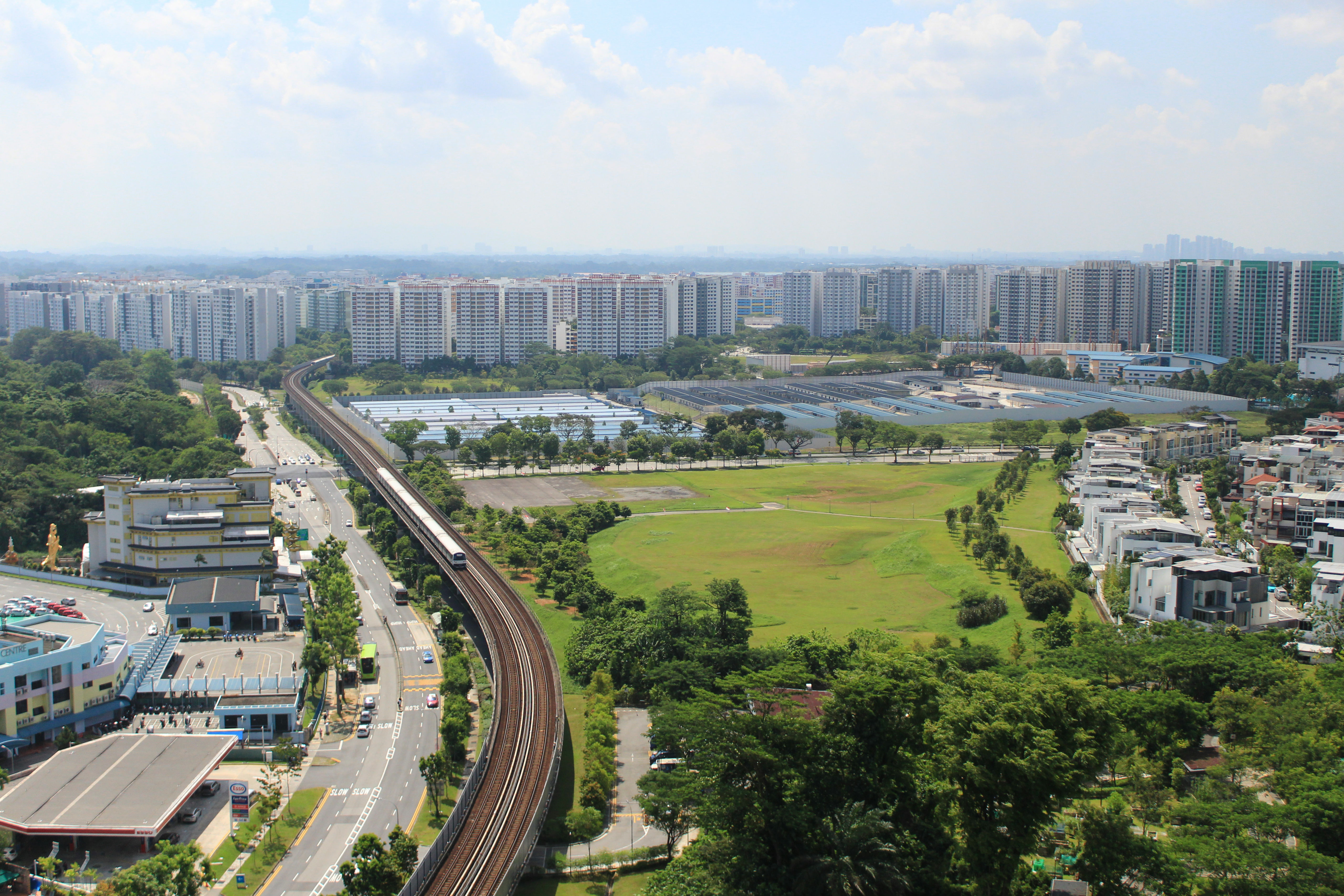
Brickland's site

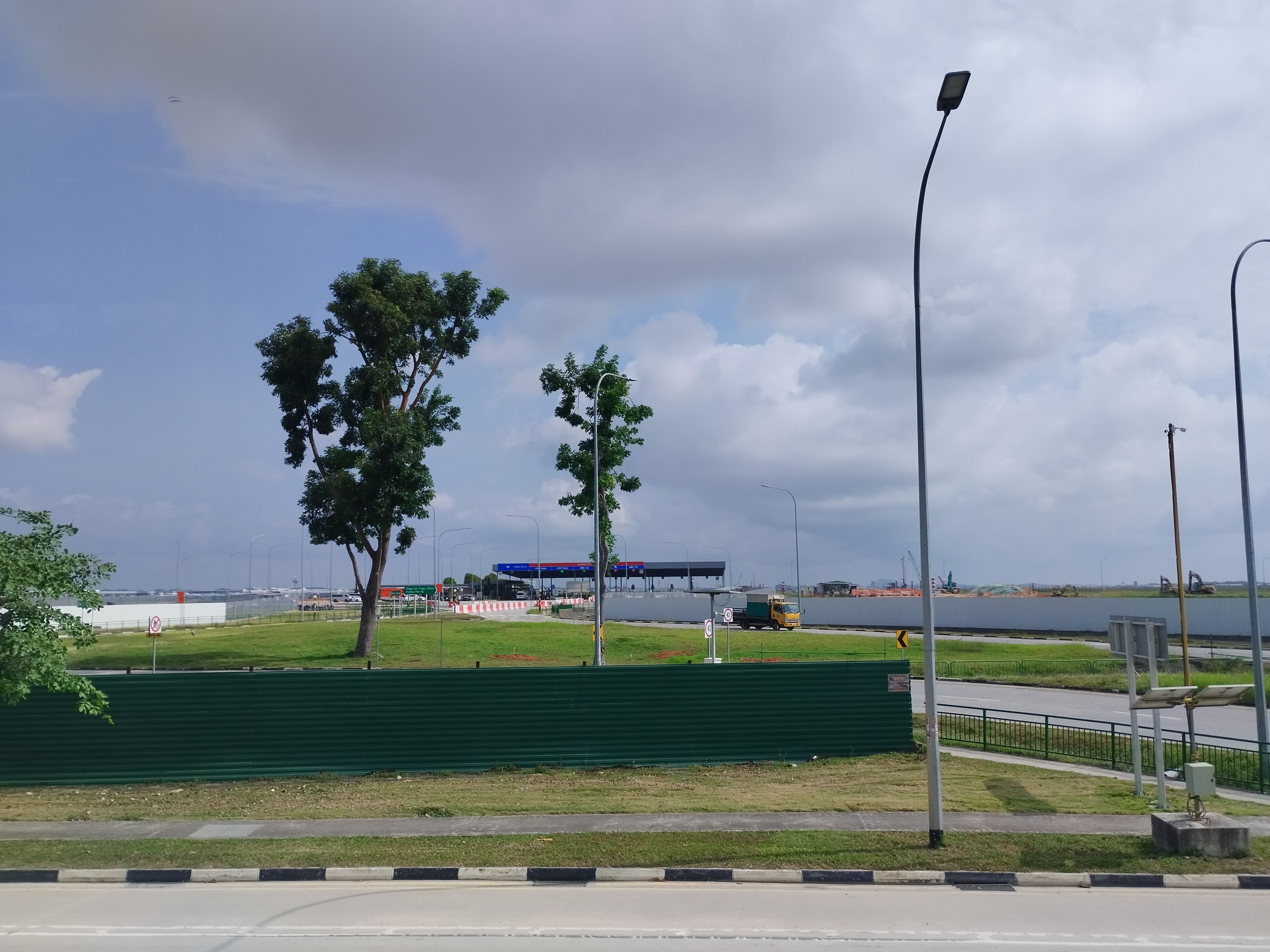
Changi Terminal 5's site

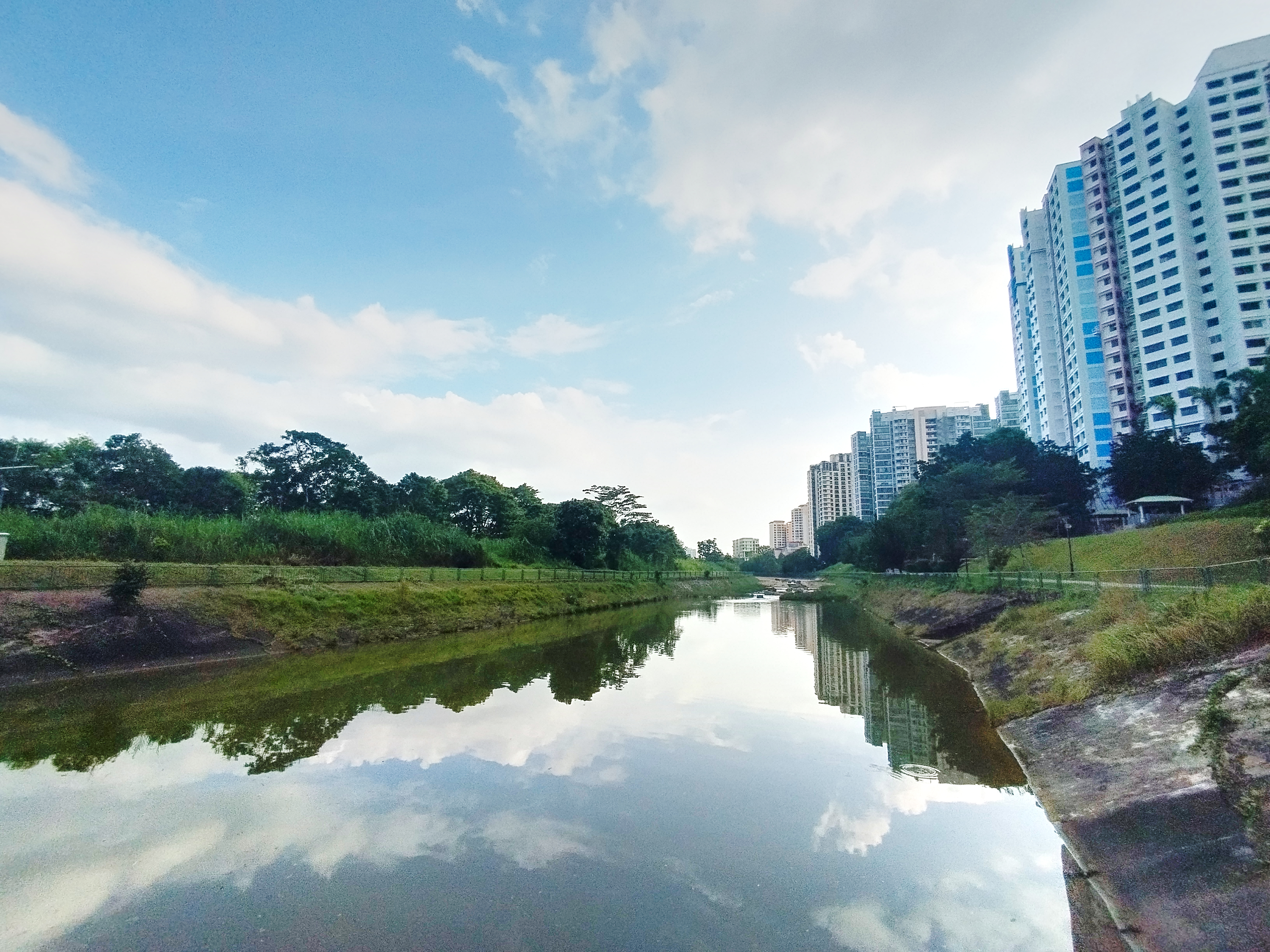
DE1's site

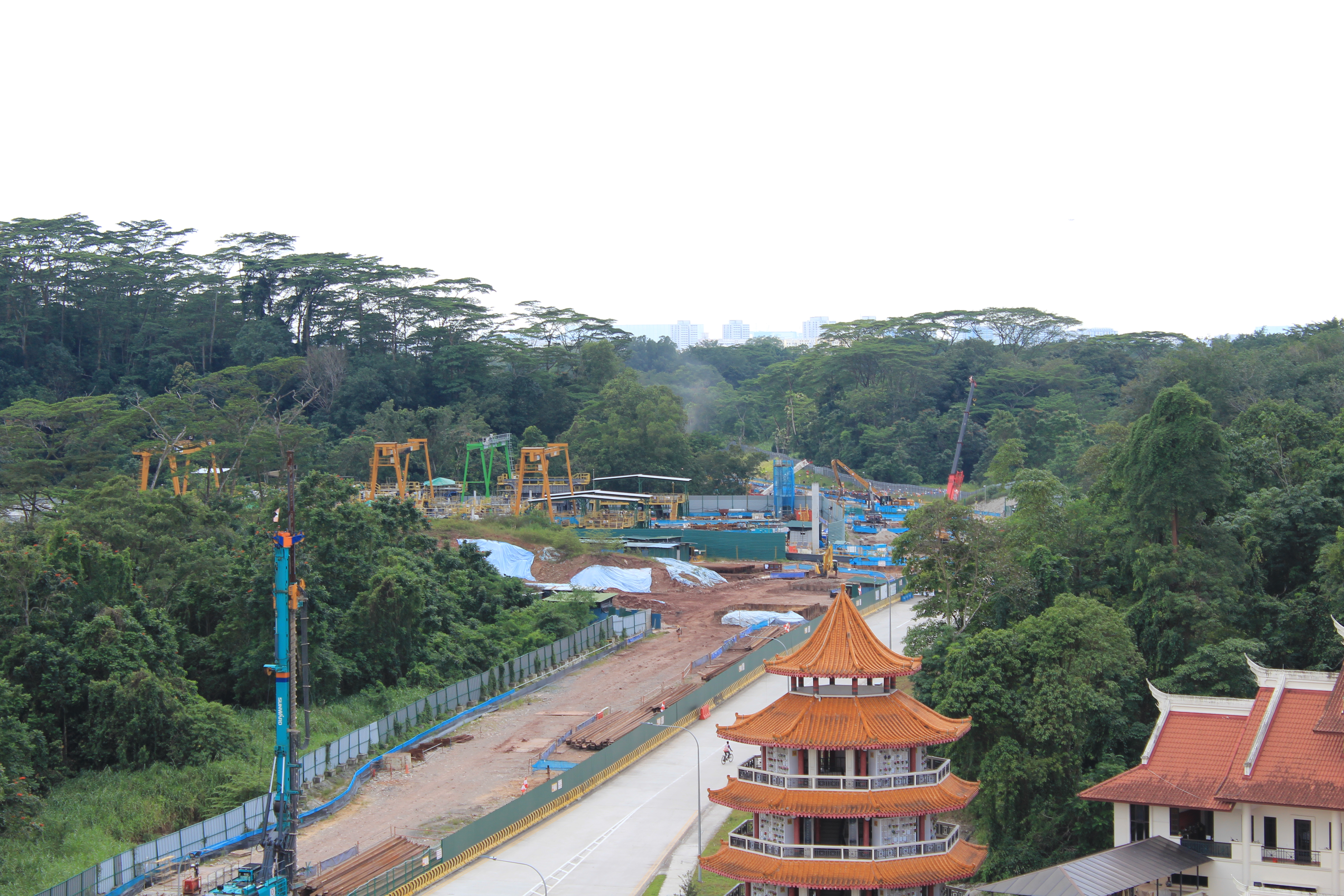
JS2A's site

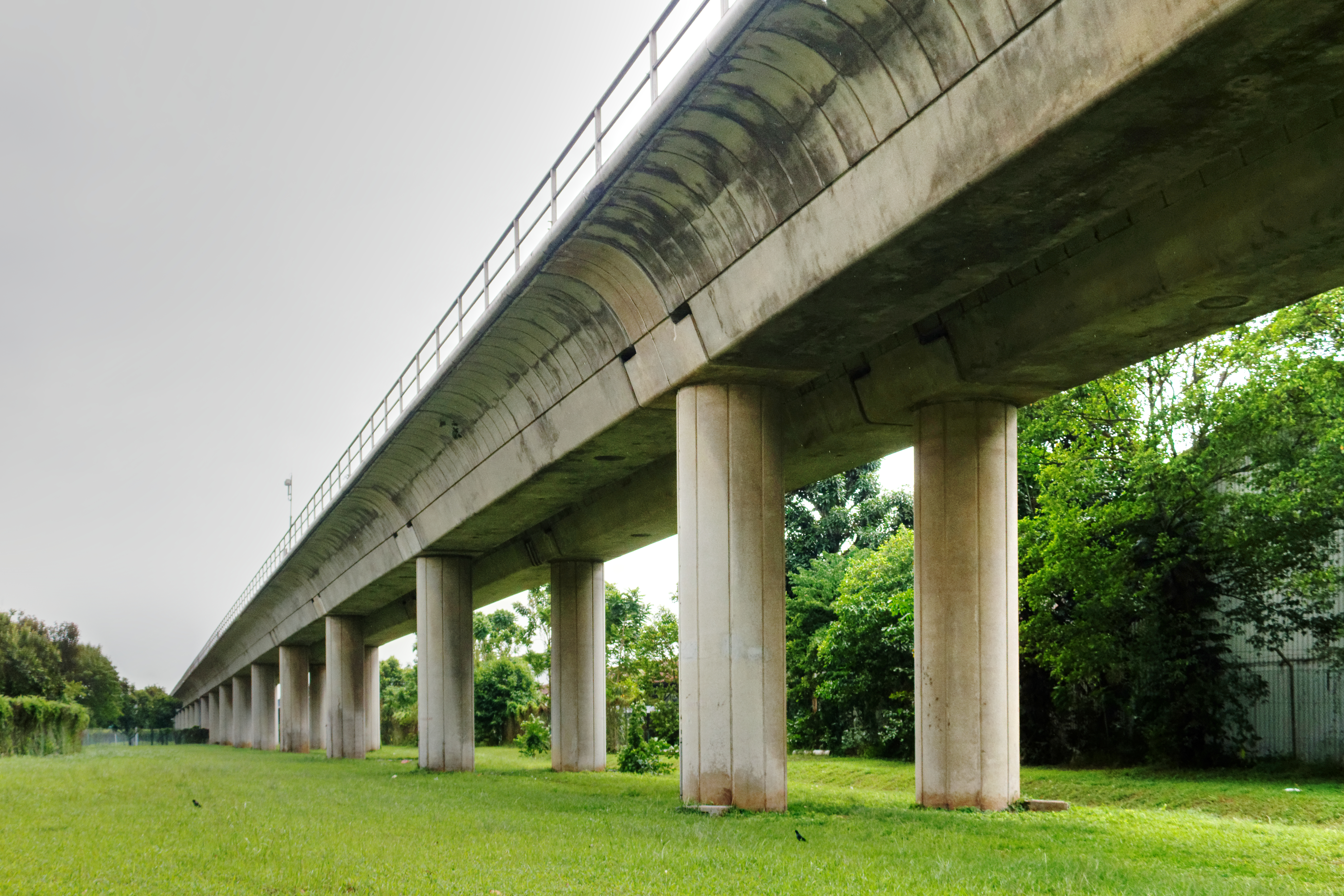
Sungei Kadut's site

== See also ==
- Mass Rapid Transit (Singapore)
- List of Singapore LRT stations

== Sources ==
=== Authored ===
- Begum, Shabana (28 August 2021). "Commuters on First Trains at New TEL2 Stations Reminisce About Inaugural 1980s MRT Rides". The Straits Times. Archived from the original on 28 August 2021.
- Cai, Weiqian (7 July 2025). 地铁跨岛线次阶段动工 2032年完成 [Cross Island Line second phase construction begins, to be completed in 2032]. Lianhe Zaobao (in Chinese). Archived from the original on 12 October 2025.
- Chelvan, Vanessa Paige (12 August 2025). "Circle Line to close early most Fridays and Saturdays, start late most weekends from Sept 5 to Dec 28". The Straits Times. Archived from the original on 30 January 2026.
- Chelvan, Vanessa Paige (30 January 2026a). "More Rides on MRT in 2025 as LRT use Fell; Bus Ride Numbers still Below Pre-Covid-19 Levels". The Straits Times. Archived from the original on 31 January 2026.
- Chelvan, Vanessa Paige (4 March 2026b). "New Jurong Region Line station Added in Tengah; Opening of Line Delayed to Mid-2028: Jeffrey Siow". The Straits Times. Archived from the original on 4 March 2026.
- Chew, Seng Kim; et al. (7 August 2002). "Local Flavour for Stops Along N-E Line". The Straits Times. p. 8.
- Chong, Clara (10 December 2019). "Construction of Jurong West, Bahar Junction stations on Jurong Region Line to start in 2020, end in 2026". The Straits Times. Archived from the original on 31 July 2023.
- Deng, Weiting (25 July 2025). 樟宜机场第五搭客大厦将建汤东线和跨岛线地铁转换站 [Changi Airport Terminal 5 will have an interchange station for the Thomson-East Line and the Cross Island Line MRT]. Lianhe Zaobao (in Chinese). Archived from the original on 25 January 2026.
- Deng, Weiting (10 October 2023). 地铁跨岛线榜鹅延长线开建 2032年料通车 [Construction begins on the Punggol extension of the Cross Island Line, expected to open in 2032]. Lianhe Zaobao (in Chinese). Archived from the original on 23 January 2026.
- Deng, Weiting (22 February 2022). 地铁跨岛线德福和淡滨尼北站建筑工程 料今年第二季展开 [Construction work on Defu and Tampines North stations on the Cross Island Line is expected to begin in the second quarter of this year]. Lianhe Zaobao (in Chinese). Archived from the original on 22 February 2022.
- Dhaliwal, Rav; Lim, Michael (8 November 1987). "All Aboard for the Subway Age". The Straits Times. p. 1. Archived from the original on 11 December 2020 – via NewspaperSG.
- Dhaliwal, Rav (4 November 1989). "East-enders Get Ticket to Ride as MRT Opens Line". The Straits Times. p. 23. Archived from the original on 14 April 2026 – via NewspaperSG.
- Dhaliwal, Rav (12 December 1987). "Shopping for Xmas the MRT Way..." The Straits Times. p. 1. Archived from the original on 24 January 2018 – via NewspaperSG.
- Dhaliwal, Rav (7 July 1990). "S'pore's Largest Project Built on Time and Below Budget: Dr Yeo". The Straits Times. p. 3. Archived from the original on 30 January 2026 – via NewspaperSG.
- Dhaliwal, Rav (13 March 1988). "Well Done, Says PM". The Straits Times. p. 1. Archived from the original on 16 January 2026 – via NewspaperSG.
- Hamzah, Aqil (4 November 2026). "Three new MRT stations to open on Dec 26, paving way for direct link to JB for residents in east". The Straits Times. Archived from the original on 4 November 2026.
- Hamzah, Aqil; Chelvan, Venessa Paige (31 July 2026). "4 new MRT stations to be built for Cross Island Line; interchanges at Jurong Pier, Gul Circle". The Straits Times.
- Ho, Stephanie (5 November 2013). "Mass Rapid Transit (MRT) system". National Library Board. Archived from the original on 19 March 2026.
- Jo, Yeo Sam (28 December 2015). "Thousands Check out Downtown Line 2 on Opening Day". The Straits Times. Archived from the original on 13 January 2021.
- Kok, Yufeng (7 January 2025). "DTL extension to Sungei Kadut to open in 2035, including new MRT station near Yew Tee Village". The Straits Times. Archived from the original on 30 January 2026.
- Lee, Li Ying (23 June 2024a). "Seven MRT Stations on TEL Open for Passenger Service". The Straits Times. Archived from the original on 23 June 2024.
- Lee, Nian Tjoe (13 November 2024). "Work starts on Cross Island MRT Line Punggol extension; over 70,000 daily journeys to be shortened". The Straits Times. Archived from the original on 30 January 2026.
- Li, Jingyi (9 May 2018). 裕廊区域线预计明年初动工兴建 [Construction of the Jurong Region Line is Expected to Begin Early Next Year]. Lianhe Zaobao (in Chinese). Archived from the original on 8 April 2022.
- Li, Jingyi (7 July 2023). 汤东线第四阶段七个地铁站明年启用 [Seven stations will Open Next Year as Part of TEL Stage 4]. Lianhe Zaobao (in Chinese). Archived from the original on 17 July 2023.
- Li, Simin (23 November 2021). 汤申—东海岸线第三阶段两个地铁站延迟启用 [The Opening of Two MRT stations in the Third phase of the Thomson-East Coast Line Project has Been Delayed]. Lianhe Zaobao (in Chinese). Archived from the original on 30 January 2026.
- Lim, Cheryl (27 February 2009a). "Boon Lay MRT Extension to Open on Saturday". CNA. Archived from the original on 28 February 2009.
- Lim, Cheryl (28 May 2009b). "Part of Circle Line Opens Today". CNA. Archived from the original on 28 May 2009.
- Lim, Jessie (13 November 2022). "Stations Buzzing on First Day of Operations for Third Stage of Thomson–East Coast Line". The Straits Times. Archived from the original on 1 February 2023.
- Lim, Kenneth (16 June 2017). "Tuas West Extension Opens After Six-Month Delay". CNA. Archived from the original on 31 March 2018.
- Lim, Kolette (1 November 2024a). "New bus interchange in Buangkok to open on Dec 1". The Straits Times. Archived from the original on 9 November 2024.
- Lim, Vanessa (10 December 2024b). "Punggol Coast MRT Station Opens, Enabling Commuters to Save 15 Minutes When Travelling to City Centre". CNA. Archived from the original on 10 December 2024.
- Ng, Keng Gene (23 November 2021). "Mount Pleasant, Marina South MRT Stations to Open in Tandem with Housing Developments". The Straits Times. Archived from the original on 23 November 2021.
- Ng, Keng Gene (10 September 2024). "Founders' Memorial's construction set to cost $335 million". The Straits Times. Archived from the original on 9 September 2024.
- Ong, Justin Guang-Xi (28 February 2025a). "Hume Station Opens After Years of 'Patience and Perseverance' from Residents". CNA. Archived from the original on 20 December 2025.
- Ong, Justin Guang-Xi (5 March 2025b). "New Tengah and Seletar MRT lines being studied, could be operational from 2040s". CNA. Archived from the original on 24 January 2026.
- Ong, Justin Guang-Xi (7 July 2025c). "Construction begins on 6 Cross Island Line Phase 2 stations; targeted for 2032 completion". CNA. Archived from the original on 7 July 2025.
- Ramesh, S. (20 June 2011). "Train Finally Arrives at Woodleigh MRT Station". CNA. Archived from the original on 4 May 2012.
- Richmond, Jonathan E. D. (16 April 2008). "Transporting Singapore—The Air‐Conditioned Nation". Transport Reviews. 28 (3). doi:10.1080/01441640701722363. Archived from the original on 7 July 2026 – via Taylor and Francis.
- Shaffiq, Alkhatib Idris (21 October 2017). "Downtown Line 3 Opens to Public". The Straits Times. Archived from the original on 6 April 2019.
- Sim, Royston (21 December 2013). "Downtown Line Stage 1 Officially Opened by PM Lee". The Straits Times. Archived from the original on 1 March 2021.
- Tan, Christopher (1 November 2019). "Canberra MRT station on North-South Line opens with green features that help reduce running costs". The Straits Times. Archived from the original on 19 February 2023.
- Tan, Christopher (10 January 2001). "Expo MRT station opens today". The Business Times. p. 15. Archived from the original on 30 January 2026 – via NewspaperSG.
- Toh, Ting Wei (25 May 2019). "New Sungei Kadut MRT station linking North-South and Downtown lines could shorten trips by 30 mins". The Straits Times. Archived from the original on 24 May 2022.
- Wong, Kai Yi (31 January 2020). "3 Stations on Thomson-East Coast Line Begin Operations". The Straits Times. Archived from the original on 5 February 2020.
- Wong, Man Shun (12 July 2026). "Three new Circle Line stations draw early morning crowds on opening day". The Straits Times. Archived from the original on 12 July 2026.
- Yeo, Geraldine (5 August 1996). "Commuters Jam Woodlands Extension". The Straits Times. p. 22. Archived from the original on 4 February 2026 – via NewspaperSG.
- Yeoh, Grace (18 January 2023a). "Construction of Cross Island Line begins, with 12 stations in Phase 1". CNA. Archived from the original on 18 January 2023.
- Yeoh, Grace (18 January 2023b). "Construction of Jurong Region Line begins, with 24 new MRT stations". CNA. Archived from the original on 13 January 2023.
- Yow, Daphne (30 December 2025). "Construction of new Brickland MRT station on North-South Line to begin in 2026". CNA. Archived from the original on 30 December 2025.

=== Anonymous sources ===
- "A Colourful Start for New MRT Service". The Business Times. 21 December 1988. p. 2. Archived from the original on 3 January 2026 – via NewspaperSG.
- தேச நிறுவனர்கள் நினைவிட ரயில் நிலையம் உருவாகும் [A Railway Station will be Built to Commemorate the Founding Fathers of the Nation]. Tamil Murasu (in Tamil). 7 January 2019. Archived from the original on 1 March 2026.
- 分析师：拟议中的实里达地铁线 可成狮城新山“重要衔接点” [Analysts: The Proposed Seletar MRT line Could Become a "Key Link" to Johor Bahru, Singapore]. 8world (in Chinese). 6 March 2025. Archived from the original on 30 January 2026.
- 地铁南北线红砖站料明年上半年动工 2034年投入服务 [Brickland Station on the North-South Line is Expected to Begin Construction in the First Half of Next Year and be Operational by 2034]. 8world (in Chinese). 30 December 2025. Archived from the original on 24 January 2026.
- குறுக்குத் தீவு ரயில் பாதையின் பொங்கோல் நீட்டிப்புக் கட்டுமானப் பணி தொடங்கியது [Construction Work on the Punggol Extension of the Cross Island Line has Begun]. Tamil Murasu (in Tamil). 10 October 2023. Archived from the original on 31 January 2026.
- குறுக்குத் தீவு ரயில் பாதை: இரண்டாம் கட்ட பணிகள் தொடங்கின [Cross-Island Line: Phase 2 Work Begins]. Tamil Murasu (in Tamil). 7 July 2025. Archived from the original on 31 January 2026.
- குறுக்குத் தீவு ரயில் பாதை: மாஜு நிலையத்துக்கான பணிகள் 2024ன் இரண்டாம் காலாண்டில் துவங்கும் [Cross-Island Line: Work on Maju Station to Begin in the Second Quarter of 2024]. Tamil Murasu (in Tamil). 31 January 2024. Archived from the original on 31 January 2026.
- குறுக்குத் தீவுப் பாதை – எப்படி கட்டங்கட்டமாக உருப்பெறுகிறது? [Cross Island Line – What is its Alignment?]. Seithi Mediacorp (in Tamil). 5 December 2019. Archived from the original on 25 January 2026.
- "Crowds Came from as Far as Hougang and Jurong". The Straits Times. 11 February 1996. p. 19. Archived from the original on 16 September 2025 – via NewspaperSG.
- "Early Stations' Bare Essentials". The Straits Times. 29 February 2020. Archived from the original on 29 February 2020.
- "List of Civil Defence Public Shelter (As of Jan 2025)" (PDF). Singapore Civil Defence Force. January 2025. Archived (PDF) from the original on 5 January 2026.
- "Marina South Pier MRT Station to Open This Sunday". Today. 17 November 2014. Archived from the original on 28 February 2021.
- "MRT at Changi Airport T5 to be an Interchange Station Linking TEL and CRL". CNA. 25 July 2025. Archived from the original on 22 January 2026.
- "MRT Station Roofs to Show Singapore's Cultural Mix". The Straits Times. 13 April 1987. p. 13. Archived from the original on 15 May 2020 – via NewspaperSG.
- "MRT transfers will begin this Saturday". The Straits Times. 24 October 1989. p. 3. Archived from the original on 11 September 2021 – via NewspaperSG.
- புதிய Brickland ரயில் நிலையம் - கட்டுமானம் அடுத்த ஆண்டு தொடங்கும் [New Brickland Train Station – Construction to Begin Next Year]. Seithi Mediacorp (in Tamil). 30 December 2025. Archived from the original on 30 January 2026.
- சாங்கி விமான நிலைய ஐந்தாம் முனையத்தில் புதிய MRT நிலையம் [New MRT Station at Changi Airport Terminal 5]. Seithi Mediacorp (in Tamil). 25 July 2025. Archived from the original on 24 January 2026.
- "OneMap". OneMap. 9 May 2026. Archived from the original on 3 May 2026.
- "Residents Get Special 'Shuttle Service' with Bukit MRT Line". The Straits Times. 11 March 1990. p. 15. Archived from the original on 17 June 2025 – via NewspaperSG.
- "Residents Welcome MRT Trains to Eastern End of S'pore". The Straits Times. 17 December 1989. p. 20. Archived from the original on 8 December 2020 – via NewspaperSG.
- "Roof to Make Heads Turn". The Straits Times. 20 April 1986. p. 12. Archived from the original on 12 December 2020 – via NewspaperSG.
- "Thomson Line – Contract 208". Noma Consulting. 9 January 2026. Archived from the original on 27 September 2025.
- "Types of Shelters". Singapore Civil Defence Force. 19 March 2026. Archived from the original on 19 March 2026.
- "Three More Stations for MRT System". The Business Times. 5 November 1988. p. 2. Archived from the original on 20 October 2017 – via NewspaperSG.

=== Primary works ===
- "An Inclusive Public Transport System – Making it Easier to Get Around". Land Transport Authority. 1 February 2026. Archived from the original on 19 April 2025.
- "Ang Mo Kio – Map". SMRT Journeys. 11 January 2026. Archived from the original on 10 January 2026.
- "Art in Transit". Land Transport Authority. 1 February 2026. Archived from the original on 23 June 2024.
- "Bedok – Map". SMRT Journeys. 30 January 2026. Archived from the original on 16 January 2026.
- "Bishan – Map". SMRT Journeys. 30 January 2026. Archived from the original on 13 January 2026.
- "Boon Lay – Map". SMRT Journeys. 6 March 2026. Archived from the original on 6 March 2026.
- "Buangkok NEL Station Commences Revenue Service Amid Great Fanfare". SBS Transit. 15 January 2006. Archived from the original on 29 August 2019.
- "Bukit Batok – Map". SMRT Journeys. 30 January 2026. Archived from the original on 17 June 2025.
- "Bukit Panjang – Map". SMRT Journeys. 30 January 2026. Archived from the original on 21 July 2025.
- "Changi Airport – Exits". SMRT Journeys. 30 January 2026. Archived from the original on 28 January 2026.
- Cheong, Colin (2012). The Circle Line, Linking All Lines (PDF). Singapore: Land Transport Authority. ISBN 9789814342025. OCLC 743194452. Archived (PDF) from the original on 4 February 2026.
- "Choa Chu Kang – Map". SMRT Journeys. 30 January 2026. Archived from the original on 6 March 2026.
- "Circle Line". Land Transport Authority. 29 May 2026. Archived from the original on 29 May 2026.
- "Circle Line Extension – Train Service Information" (PDF). SMRT Journeys. 15 November 2022. Archived from the original (PDF) on 15 November 2022.
- "Circle Line from Bartley to Dhoby Ghaut to Open 17 April". SMRT Journeys. 21 June 2011. Archived from the original on 21 June 2011.
- "Circle Line – Stages 4 & 5 of Circle Line". Land Transport Authority. 17 September 2010. Archived from the original on 19 December 2011.
- "Completion of the Changi Airport MRT Extension". Ministry of Transport. 6 February 2002. Archived from the original on 21 August 2020.
- "Downtown Line". Land Transport Authority. 29 May 2026. Archived from the original on 29 May 2026.
- "Eunos – Map". SMRT Journeys. 30 January 2026. Archived from the original on 30 September 2024.
- "Government Terms Translated". Gov.sg. 24 January 2026. Archived from the original on 24 January 2026.
- "Joint News Release by the Land Transport Authority (LTA) & SLA - Jurong Region Line: Enhancing Connectivity in the West". Land Transport Authority. 21 September 2019. Archived from the original on 21 September 2019.
- "Joo Koon – Map". SMRT Journeys. 18 January 2026. Archived from the original on 26 October 2020.
- "Jurong East – Map". SMRT Journeys. 18 January 2026. Archived from the original on 6 March 2026.
- Lui, Tuck Yew (13 January 2012). Speech by Mr Lui Tuck Yew at the Opening Ceremony of the Circle Line Extension on 13 January 2012 (Speech). Archived from the original on 2 July 2020.
- "Marina South Pier – Map". SMRT Journeys. 18 January 2026. Archived from the original on 17 January 2026.
- "New Rail Financing Framework". Land Transport Authority. 1 February 2026. Archived from the original on 1 February 2026.
- "North East Line Opens for Passenger Service!". Land Transport Authority. 20 June 2003. Archived from the original on 3 December 2007 – via Web Archive Singapore.
- "Pasir Ris – Map". SMRT Journeys. 18 January 2026. Archived from the original on 18 January 2026.
- "Rail Network". Land Transport Authority. 30 January 2026. Archived from the original on 16 July 2025.
- "Rail System Map – (MRT/LRT, Including Lines Under Construction)". Land Transport Authority. 28 April 2008. Archived from the original on 28 April 2008.
- "Sembawang – Map". SMRT Journeys. 18 January 2026. Archived from the original on 12 January 2026.
- Shanmugaratnam, Tharman (7 October 2011). Speech by Mr Tharman Shanmugaratnam at the Circle Line Opening Ceremony on 7 Oct 2011 (Speech). Archived from the original on 1 May 2020.
- "System Map". Land Transport Authority. 12 July 2026. Archived from the original on 11 July 2026.
- "System Map" (in Chinese). Land Transport Authority. 12 July 2026.
- "System Map" (in Malay). Land Transport Authority. 12 July 2026. Archived from the original on 11 July 2026.
- "System Map" (in Tamil). Land Transport Authority. 12 July 2026.
- "Tampines – Map". SMRT Journeys. 30 January 2026. Archived from the original on 18 January 2026.
- "Thomson-East Coast Line – Journeys to the East". Land Transport Authority. 30 January 2026. Archived from the original on 25 January 2026.
- "Toa Payoh – Map". SMRT Journeys. 30 January 2026. Archived from the original on 14 June 2025.
- "Train Service Information – HarbourFront". SBS Transit. 30 January 2026. Archived from the original on 16 February 2022.
- "Train Service Information – Hougang". SBS Transit. 30 January 2026. Archived from the original on 17 January 2026.
- "Train Service Information – Punggol". SBS Transit. 30 January 2026. Archived from the original on 25 December 2020.
- "Train Service Information – Punggol Coast". SBS Transit. 30 January 2026. Archived from the original on 10 December 2024.
- "Train Service Information – Sengkang". SBS Transit. 30 January 2026. Archived from the original on 2 October 2020.
- "Train Service Information – Serangoon". SBS Transit. 30 January 2026. Archived from the original on 4 December 2021.
- "Tuas Link – Map". SMRT Journeys. 30 January 2026. Archived from the original on 18 January 2026.
- "Woodlands – Map". SMRT Journeys. 30 January 2026. Archived from the original on 6 August 2024.
- Yeo, Cheow Tong (23 October 2001). Speech by Mr Yeo Cheow Tong at the Official Opening of Dover Station on 23 Oct 2001 (Speech). Ministry of Transport. Archived from the original on 5 September 2020.
- "Yio Chu Kang – Map". SMRT Journeys. 30 January 2026. Archived from the original on 18 January 2026.
- "Yishun – Map". SMRT Journeys. 30 January 2026. Archived from the original on 18 January 2026.
