= Bukit Brown Cemetery =

Cemetery in Novena, Singapore

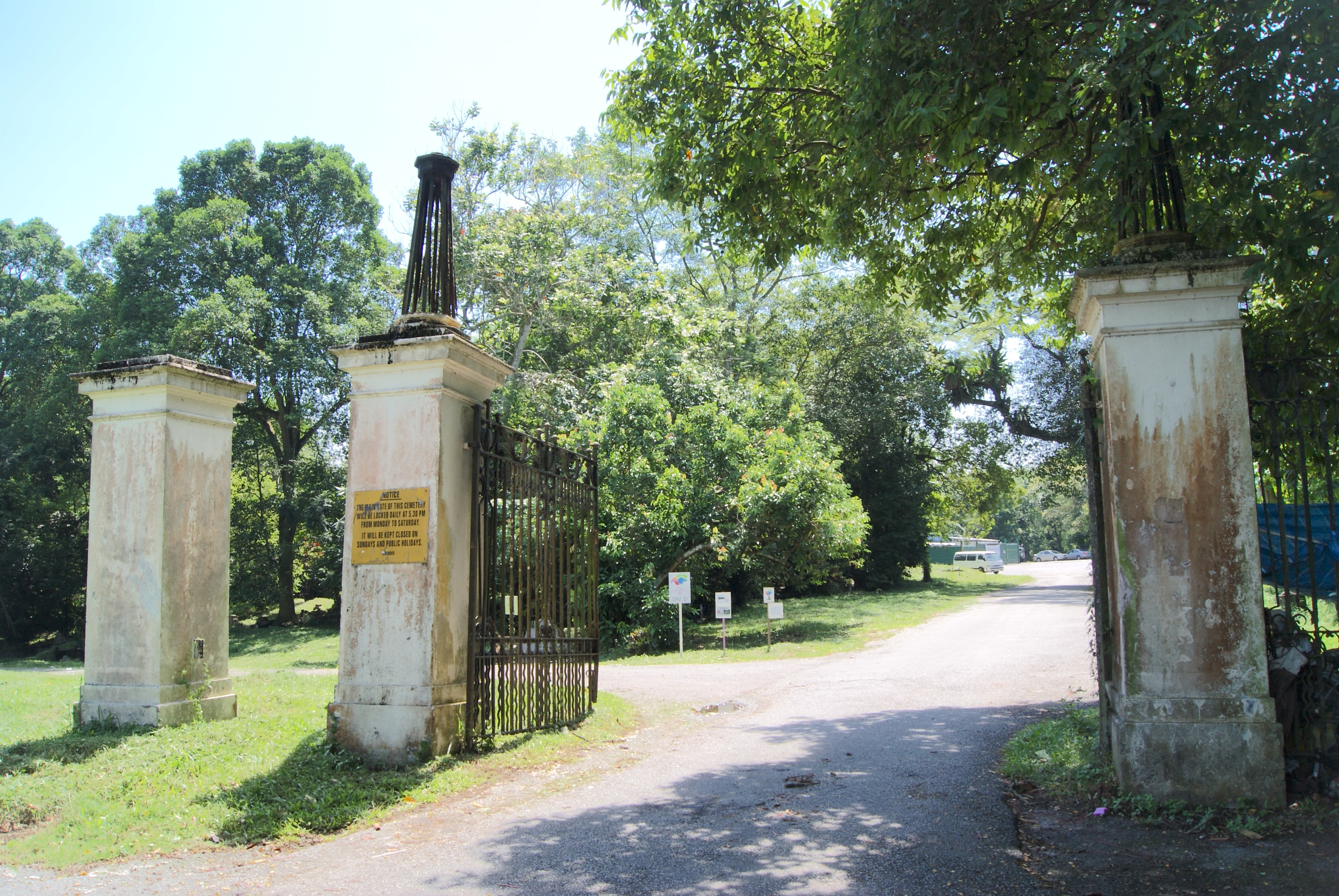
- Main gate to Bukit Brown Cemetery in 2013
- Interactive map of Bukit Brown Cemetery

Details
- Established: 1 January 1922
- Closed: 1973
- Location: 36C Lor Halwa, Singapore 298637
- Country: Singapore
- Coordinates: 1.3361°N 103.8230°E
- Type: Chinese
- Size: 173 to 213 acres (70 to 86 ha)
- No. of graves: 100,000

Bukit Brown Cemetery, also known as the Bukit Brown Municipal Cemetery or the Bukit Brown Chinese Cemetery, is located in Novena in the Central Region of Singapore. The site of the cemetery was originally owned by George Henry Brown, a British merchant. It became known as Brown's Hill, which was translated into Malay as Bukit Brown. The site was eventually given to the Seh Ong Kongsi, who opened a private clan cemetery there in the 1870s.

Beginning in the 1880s, cemeteries in Singapore grew rapidly. In 1887, the Legislative Council passed a bill that limited their creation, particularly limiting Chinese cemeteries. The Chinese community called for the creation of a municipal cemetery, having few options for burying their dead, with notable supporters of the concept including Tan Kheam Hock and Lim Boon Keng. The Municipal Commission began looking for suitable sites and settled on the Seh Ong Kongsi's land, acquiring the site in 1919 through compulsory acquisition.

Three years later, the Commission opened Bukit Brown Cemetery. Although initially unpopular with the Chinese community, after some modifications, use increased. By 1929, forty percent of Chinese buried in Singapore were interred at Bukit Brown Cemetery. The cemetery ran out of unreserved plots in 1944, and when the last burials were held, the cemetery was closed in 1973, containing about 100,000 graves. In 2011, the government designated the area for residential development, leading to protests from activists who believed the cemetery should be preserved. The following year, around 3,700 graves were exhumed to build an eight-lane highway. The cemetery was since designated as "at risk" on the 2014 World Monuments Watch, and there have been proposals to designate it a national monument.

Bukit Brown Cemetery is believed to be the largest Chinese cemetery outside of China, and is the burial location of many of Singapore's earliest pioneers. Preservation advocates support maintaining Bukit Brown and other nearby cemeteries for their vegetation, wildlife, and heritage. Traditional Chinese festivals are regularly held at these cemeteries.

== Etymology ==
The cemetery and the surrounding area are referred to as Bukit Brown (bukit meaning hill in Malay), after George Henry Brown, the original owner of the land where the cemetery is situated. The cemetery is also known as the Bukit Brown Municipal Cemetery or the Bukit Brown Chinese Cemetery. The name was the first official designation in Singapore to by a hybrid of multiple languages, including both English and Malay. Brown named the hill where the cemetery is located Mount Pleasant.

== History ==
=== 1800s: Early establishments ===
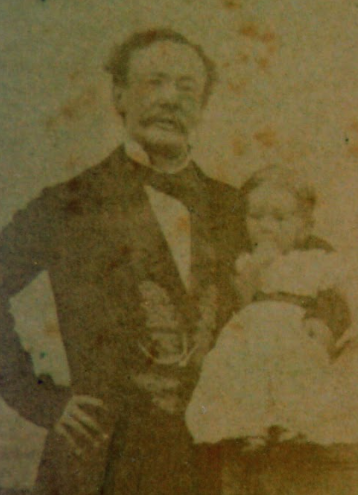
George Henry Brown in 1863 with his daughter Charlotte Ellen

George Henry Brown (1826–1882) was a nineteenth century British merchant and ship owner who arrived in Singapore (then part of the Straits Settlements) in the 1840s and lived there until his death after an accident in Penang on 5 October 1882. He owned three ships and made horse carriages.

Brown's business G. H. Brown & Co was located at Raffles Place. Brown married Ellen Brown (1827–1903) in 1854 and they had multiple children. Brown was known for his interest in music; he played the organ at St. Andrew's Cathedral. Brown also owned multiple plots of land in the colony; these included a plot that had hilly terrain, which he called Mount Pleasant. Brown built a house he called Fern Cottage at Mount Pleasant. His attempts to grow nutmeg and coffee on the site were unsuccessful. The land was referred to as Brown's Hill, locally translated into Malay as Bukit Brown. It was listed as Bukit Brown by British map makers.

Brown later sold the land to Indian Chettiar Mootapa Chitty and Chinese businessman Lim Chu Yi, who in turn sold the land to Ong Hew Ko, Ong Ewe Hai, and Ong Chong Chew. The trio gave the land to the Seh Ong Kongsi (Note: "Kongsi" is a Hokkien transcription meaning a firm, partnership, or society, and was widely used in the names of Chinese institutions in the 19th-century.) in 1872 who, sometime in the 1870s, turned the land into a private cemetery for their members, leading it to be known as Seh Ong Cemetery; the land was initially planned to be used as a village for Chinese immigrants. The Hokkien Huay Kuan also buried their clan members there.

=== 1900–2000: Bukit Brown Cemetery ===
==== Background ====
In early colonial Singapore, various ethnic communities built cemeteries according to their practices; for example, the Malays buried their dead in sand ridges while the Chinese preferred hillsides. Prior to 1857, cemeteries in Singapore were considered "communal responsibilities" and the British government exerted little control over burial locations from the multiple ethnic communities. However, by the 1880s, expansion efforts of the city centre were restricted by the scarcity of suitable land; surrounding land around the city was deemed unusable as it was either swampland or taken up by cemeteries.

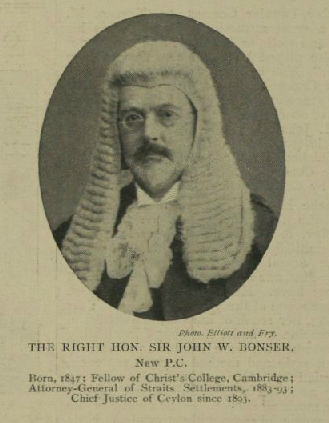
Attorney-General of the Straits Settlements John Winfield Bonser (pictured) stated of Chinese geomantic practices to be "a farrago of superstitious and ignorant nonsense".

Due to the Chinese belief in burying their dead on hillsides, many suitable pieces of land for residences were taken up by Chinese cemeteries. This belief led to concerns about sanitation, as the dead occupied the highest and more desirable sites, while the living resided on lower, more swampy land. Chinese cemeteries were increasingly seen by the authorities as both insanitary and restricting future development, leading to growing contention between the British authorities and Chinese communities in Singapore.

In 1887, a bill, which authorised the regulation, licensing, and inspection of cemeteries, was created in an attempt to control the development of cemeteries, particularly targeting Chinese cemeteries. When it was first introduced at a Legislative Council meeting, it was considered controversial by the Chinese community as it attacked their spaces and ignored their funerary practices. Seah Liang Seah, a Chinese councillor, requested a postponement of the bill as it "seriously affected the interests of the Chinese community, mostly those of the respectable class." Following multiple petitions by the Chinese community, the bill was postponed and subsequently left in abeyance until 1896, when the issue of burials was reintroduced.

The reintroduced bill was updated, giving the control of burial grounds to the Municipal Commission rather than the Legislative Council. The Commission could license, inspect burial grounds, close burial grounds if they were deemed unsafe, and impose penalties for improper corpse disposal. The control being given to the Commission was also important to the Chinese, as their views were considered more represented on that body than on the Council, which governed at a larger colonial level. Another difference between the 1896 bill and the 1887 bill was that private burial grounds would be allowed if licensed, instead of being fully prohibited. These restrictions led to private Chinese cemeteries becoming more prevalent, with a lack of public cemeteries for poor Chinese labourers, who resorted to illegally dumping their dead along five-foot ways and public places in the hopes that authorities who discover the bodies would bury them.

==== Municipal acquisition and creation of Bukit Brown ====
Talks on the creation of a municipal Chinese cemetery had been ongoing since the 1880s, following complaints of restrictions placed on existing Chinese cemeteries. In the early twentieth century, following closures of cemeteries with maximum occupancies, older cemeteries being redeveloped, and fewer private cemeteries being made, the creation of a municipal cemetery became more important. Due to the urgency of the situation, some Chinese did not mind being buried in a municipal cemetery if it meant ignoring traditional burial methods involving geomancy.

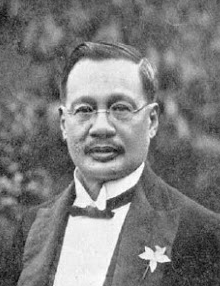
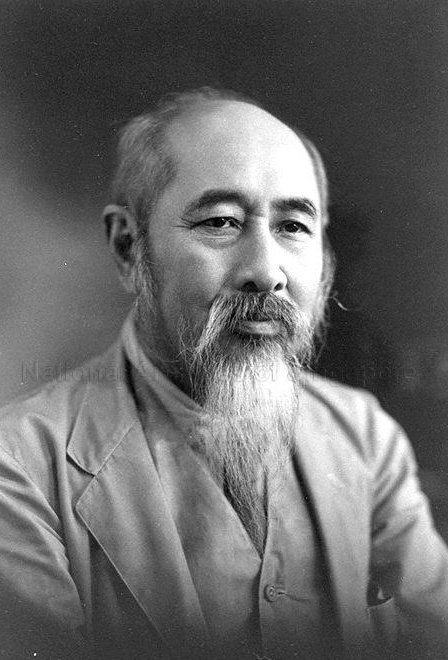
(L–R) Tan Kheam Hock and Lim Boon Keng were supporters of the establishment of a municipal cemetery for the Chinese.

The first official mention of a municipal Chinese cemetery was as early as 1904, when a group of Chinese residents, including Chinese social activist Lim Boon Keng, suggested that the commissioners "set aside a burial ground for their use to be managed on the lines of the Christian Cemetery". In 1906, Lim again suggested the inception of a proper burial site for the Chinese community, which the Commission unanimously agreed to. Straits-born businessman Ching Keng Lee also agreed on its importance, as it helped Chinese people of lower or middle income to afford burials. Singaporean politician Tan Kheam Hock also supported the establishment of a public Chinese cemetery. In Song Ong Siang's One Hundred Years' History of the Chinese in Singapore (1923), Tan was described as their "remembrancer" on the Municipal Board. After Bukit Brown Cemetery was opened, Tan managed the cemetery until his death.

Given the breadth of support for a municipal cemetery, the Municipal Commission began sourcing suitable locations. The Hokkien cemetery at Keppel Harbour and the cemetery at Holland Road were initially considered for use, but were eventually rejected. Another option was at Bidadari, where the existing Bidadari Cemetery was already located, but the Commission rejected it as "the burial customs of the Chinese were incompatible with the general ambience of a site already consecrated to the Christian dead." The municipal president further stated that "there might be clashing and inconvenience" if burials from different traditions happened to take place at the same time. In a meeting on 26 October 1917, the Municipal Commission announced their selection of the Seh Ong Cemetery, particularly due to its size and cost. Tan later brought up whether progress had been made in acquiring land at Bukit Brown to re-purpose it as a Chinese burial ground in a Municipal meeting in December. Following this decision, the Seh Ong Kongsi stated:

The trustees preferred to retain the land for the use of their own kongsi. There was sufficient land to last the Seh Ong Kongsi for 200 years and they preferred to reserve it for themselves rather than sell it and make use of it for other kongsis or races of Chinese who were short of burial grounds. [sic]

After multiple negotiations with the Seh Ong Kongsi, where they refused to give up the land every time, the commissioners decided that "the only other course left [for the Commission was] to approach the government to appropriate the land in spite of the unwillingness of the owners". In 1919, the Municipal Commission acquired a portion of the Seh Ong Kongsi's land through compulsory acquisition; they additionally acquired other nearby parcels of land. Two years were then spent on creating the layout for the cemetery, building footpaths and facilities, hiring staff, and establishing by-laws for the cemetery. The by-laws were created by a subcommittee of the Municipal Commission, which included commissioners Tan and See Tiong Wah, a municipal health officer, an engineer, and a legal adviser.

==== Opening of Bukit Brown and subsequent use ====
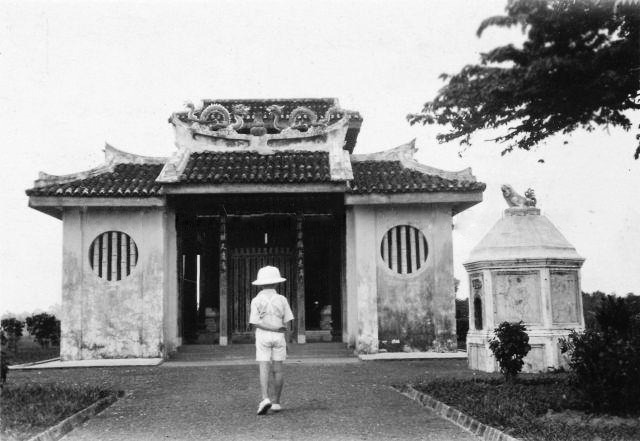
The temple at Bukit Brown Cemetery in 1929

The cemetery was officially opened as Bukit Brown Municipal Cemetery on 1 January 1922. In 1923, the road leading to Bukit Brown Cemetery was named Bukit Brown Road, with another nearby road being named Kheam Hock Road after Tan. A cemetery temple was built, and a priest who sold joss sticks and candles was hired; the temple was modelled on the Thian Hock Keng Temple in Telok Ayer. When it opened, Bukit Brown Cemetery was not initially popular with the Chinese; its first burial occurred in August 1922. The municipal president stated it was "not utilised to the extent which we had anticipated", with the main reasons being the size and layout of the grave plots, although these were put in place to maximise space. Bukit Brown Cemetery was separated into two sections – "general" and "pauper" – to make it more inclusive. The general section's plots were about 14 by 8 feet (4.3 m × 2.4 m) and cost $50 Strait whilst the pauper section's plots were 8 by 4 feet (2.4 m × 1.2 m). The pauper section was also located in a low-lying area that was regularly flooded, but there were no monetary cost for plots.

In addition to the small grave plots, they were laid out in rows in groups of ten. This fixed positioning of the plots was unpopular with the Chinese as they preferred having individualised plots that followed traditional geomancy practices; the municipal authorities preferred the fixed positions. Due to the limited plot sizes, families tended to use two burial plots for one burial. Another complaint was the Commission's inconsistency in enforcing the layout rules; some graves took up two or more plots despite the fact that the by-laws required one grave per plot. These larger plots were owned by wealthier individuals, leading to further complaints about social classes. The Municipal Commission eventually consulted with the Chinese Advisory Board, who amended the by-laws to better suit Chinese preferences. They changed the sizes of the burial plots, expanding the sizes of plots to 20 by 10 feet (6.1 m × 3.0 m) in the general section and 10 by 5 feet (3.0 m × 1.5 m) in the pauper section. Plot layouts were also changed to face either south or east and spaces for paths were left after every sixth row of graves.

These changes resulted in Bukit Brown Cemetery becoming more popular among the Chinese community. More rest houses and wells were built, and gardeners were hired to maintain the grounds. In the mid 1920s, the Singapore Improvement Trust began clearing graves in the Tiong Bahru area, with new plots offered at Bukit Brown for those affected that only cost the amount for removing the graves. By 1929, 40% of the dead among the Chinese community in Singapore were buried at Bukit Brown Cemetery. In 1941, Choa Chu Kang Cemetery was established as Bukit Brown Cemetery and Bidadari Cemetery were both running out of space. During the Japanese occupation, mass communal trenches were dug to bury thousands of unidentified victims of Japanese bombings. Research in 2014 by activists suggests that Bukit Brown was a key battleground between the Japanese and British troops due to its high terrain. According to archaeologist and military historian Jon Cooper, the only tank engagement took place at Kheam Hock Road. Some of the deaths of the Sook Ching massacre also likely took place in Bukit Brown's forested areas.

By 1944, Bukit Brown Cemetery had reached its allotted number of burials and no further burials were allowed except for those who had reserved plots. In 1946, more grave plots were released for people whose reservations had been taken up during the Japanese occupation and used for pauper burials. The following year, Bukit Brown Cemetery and Choa Chu Kang Cemetery were discussed in a municipal meeting by L. Rayman, who was concerned about the land use by the cemeteries. An amendment that limited the size of burial plots was later passed. In 1951, S$63,180 was spent by the Municipal Commission to maintain Bukit Brown Cemetery alongside two other cemeteries. S$17,040 was spent for maintenance whilst the remaining S$46,140 was for grass cutting. In 1965, the Public Works Department (PWD) exhumed 237 graves to realign Lornie Road off Adam Road. Bukit Brown Cemetery was closed for new burials in 1973, with about 100,000 graves. From 1992 to 1993, 600 graves were exhumed from nearby Chinese cemeteries to widen the Pan Island Expressway (PIE), which included Bukit Brown Cemetery.

=== 2000–present: Redevelopment plans for Bukit Brown and conservation efforts ===
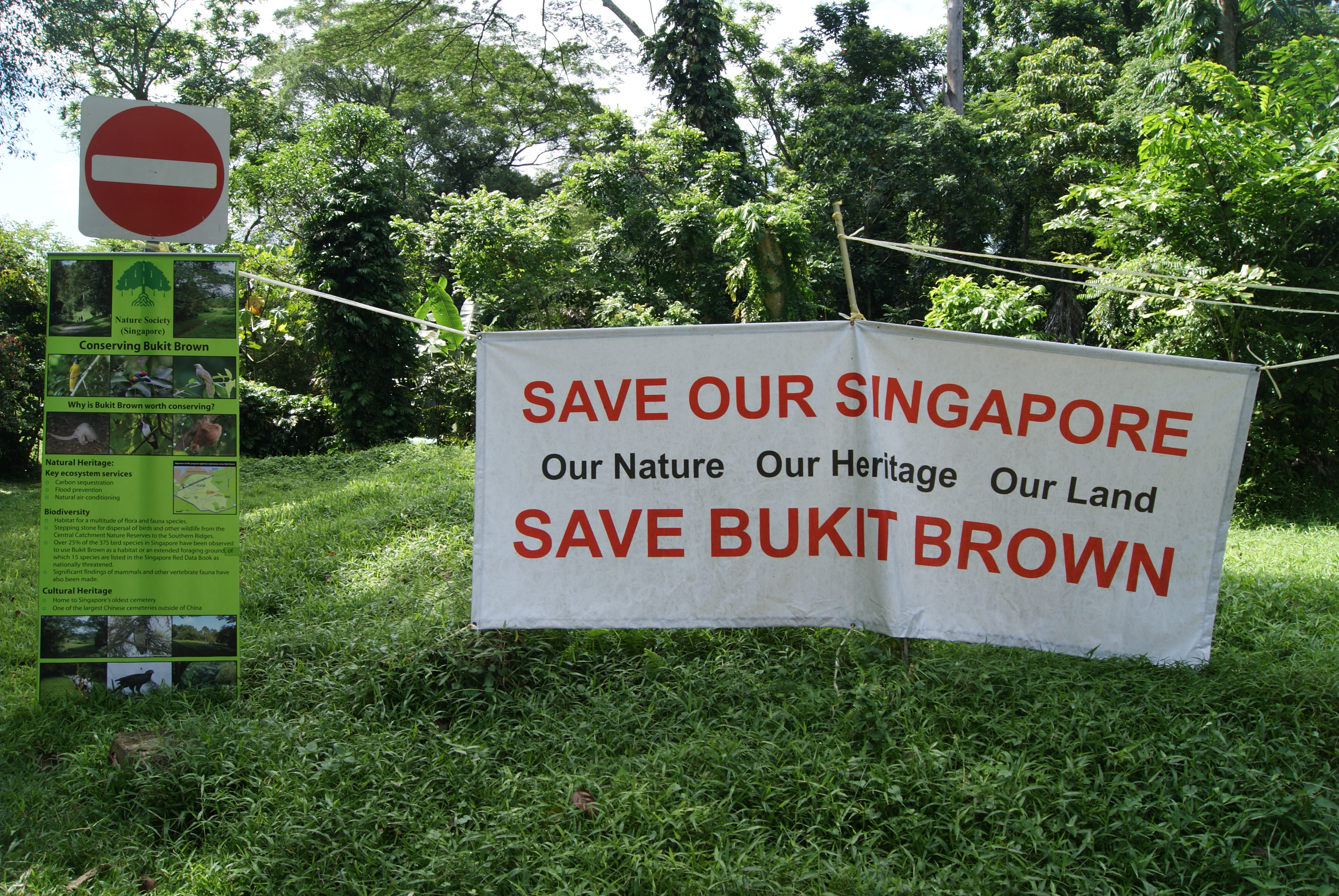
A banner opposing the building of Lornie Highway

In 2011, the area was designated for residential development, (Note: Bukit Brown had already been designated for residential development since the 1991 Concept Plan.) leaving many activists upset, as they felt that the cemetery was "a distinctive slice of the multi-ethnic country's fast disappearing heritage" and that it should be preserved. Early movements against the redevelopment plans started on Facebook, when a group titled Heritage Singapore – Bukit Brown Cemetery was launched on the platform. After the Ministry of National Development stated their plans to convert the cemetery into a housing estate by 2030, along with constructing a new road to reduce traffic on the PIE, more groups were formed such as the Rojak Librarian, All Things Bukit Brown, and SOS Bukit Brown. In 2012, National Development Minister of State Tan Chuan-Jin announced that 5,000 graves would be exhumed to make way for a new, eight-lane Lornie Highway that would cut through the cemetery, the aforementioned road to reduce traffic.

During a budget debate, Tan acknowledged the importance of heritage conservation in Singapore, but restated that the highway would have to be built to improve connectivity to the northern–northeastern region and reduce traffic congestion on the existing Lornie Road. Tan also stated that the Urban Redevelopment Authority (URA) was in the process of documenting the graves at the cemetery. On 19 March 2012, the number of graves to be exhumed was reduced to 3,746, after several consultations; those consulted for the process include the Singapore Hokkien Huay Kuan, the Singapore Heritage Society (SHS), academics, and grave experts. This was followed by a closed-door meeting between Tan and selected representatives. However, many left unconvinced, and a critical statement of the government's choices was published later that day in a collaboration between seven activist groups. Tan later responded on Facebook, stating that the meeting was only to announce the details of the highway and was not a consultative session. Furthermore, a documentation project – that was helmed by anthropologist Hui Yew-Foong – was formed by Tan as a "major government concession"; this later found controversy, however, when journalist Han Yongmei reported that only S$250,000 was provided as funding for a documentation project of such a size expected to be completed within a year.

Other criticisms included drawing similarities to Wanqingyuan's redevelopment into the Sun Yat Sen Nanyang Memorial Hall, specifically on the high cost of government funds being used to maintain the building instead of on gravestones at Bukit Brown Cemetery. Tan refuted these claims by stating that Bukit Brown was a large burial ground, while Sun Yat Sen was a memorial hall. Golf courses were also brought up by the SHS's Liew Kai Khiun, as there were "22 golf courses and three temporary golf sites [which] occupied 88 per cent of the 1,600 hectares of land used for sports and recreation in 2000, or 2.2 per cent of total land area". In support of Liew's view, an editorial brought up the 1986 demolition of the National Theatre, which only benefited a few people. On the other hand, former politician Goh Choon Kang disagreed on the comparison of Bukit Brown and golf courses, stating that the dead should make way for the living. Some writers also ironically brought up the use of government spending on artificially maintaining the Gardens by the Bay, while Bukit Brown was a product of the natural environment.

The Land Transport Authority (LTA) was also criticised for keeping their biodiversity impact assessment private, with political scientist Chong Ja Ian insisting that studies carried out by the government with taxpayers' money should be made public. The Lee Kuan Yew School of Public Policy's Paul Barter referenced the issue later and stated that "the cost-and-benefit assumptions were not made public [...] so people are naturally skeptical because they don't see the analysis." Bukit Brown activists further contemplated launching a judicial review against the government, but an analysis by the School of Law's Jack Tsen-Ta Lee found this unlikely to actually halt the construction of the highway. Following Lee's analysis, SOS Bukit Brown pushed for a public petition, calling the government's actions "unpragmatic and insufficiently thought-through".

Construction of the Lornie Highway began in 2011, and was expected to be completed by 2016, but was eventually completed in 2018. During construction, Bukit Brown Road was replaced with a section of Lornie Highway. Exhumed remains were either reinterred into smaller plots or cremated by the National Environment Agency (NEA). A bridge was built underneath to help animals pass through and the highway was aligned in such a way that it would avoid existing streams in the area. The highway itself was built 5 to 10 metres (16 to 33 ft) above depressed ground. Despite this, Ho Hua Chew of the Nature Society (Singapore) (NSS) stated that birds and plant-life would remain affected by the highway.

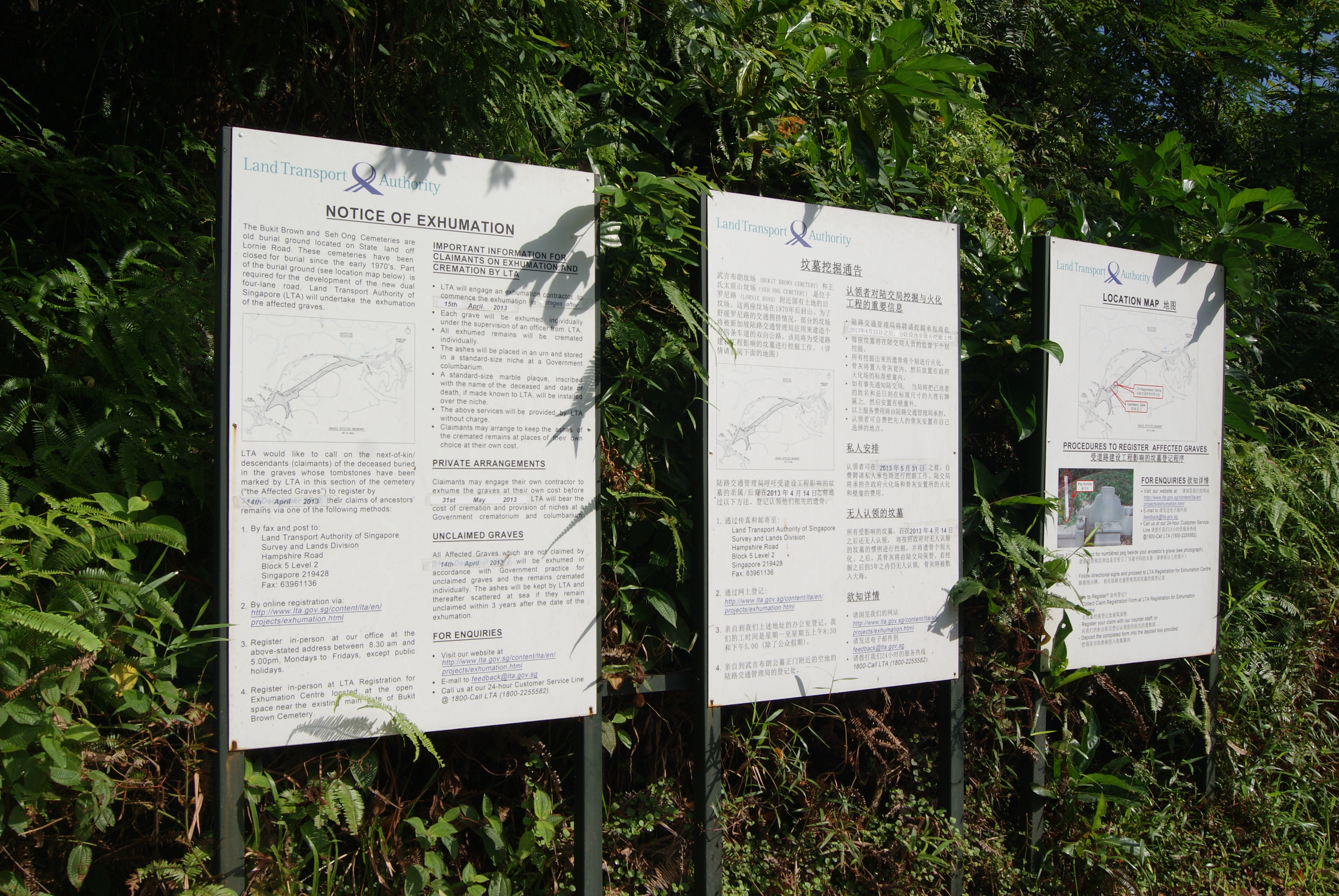
A notice at Bukit Brown Cemetery about the exhumation of graves

The National Archives of Singapore (NAS) digitised and released the burial registers of Bukit Brown Cemetery between April 1922 and December 1972 online, as well as a map of the cemetery to help descendants check if their ancestor's graves were affected by the development. It was also revealed that, in 2011, the rest of the cemetery would make way for a new public housing town in about 40 years time. In 2014, a bush fire broke out at the cemetery that was the about the size of "1½ football fields" which took the Singapore Civil Defence Force (SCDF) 2 hours to put out. The World Monuments Watch listed Bukit Brown Cemetery as an "at risk site" on their 2014 list.

In 2015, following the Singapore Botanic Gardens gaining UNESCO World Heritage Site status, Bukit Brown Cemetery and other sites were suggested as other potential World Heritage Sites. However, as cemeteries such as Bukit Brown or Jalan Kubor Cemetery were "neither a building nor a monument", they were unable to obtain national monument status, making it unlikely they would receive UNESCO World Heritage Site status. In 2016, Bukit Brown Cemetery's gates, which were installed in the 1920s, were removed from their original posts, cleaned and repaired, and reinstalled at the mouth of a new access road near its original location. In 2017, the SHS launched a self-guided trail through Bukit Brown Cemetery that took visitors around 25 gravestones. In 2021, the Kwong Wai Siew Peck San Theng (KWSPST), partnering with the National Heritage Board, began cataloguing 1,500 funerary artefacts from graves exhumed in the Lornie Highway construction. They were later displayed at the KWSPST Early Chinese Burial Artefacts Gallery, which opened in 2025. In August 2024, Bukit Brown conservation groups opened an outdoor display called Sounds of the Earth, which featured 80 unclaimed artefacts that were collected in 2013 during the construction of Lornie Highway.

== Geography ==
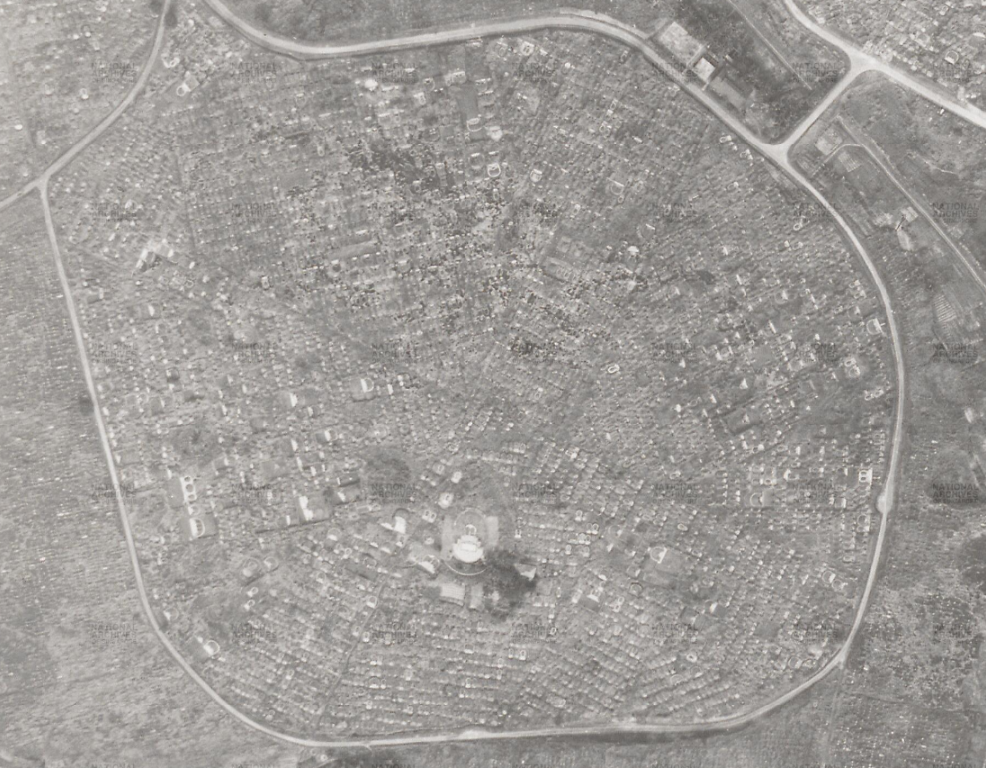
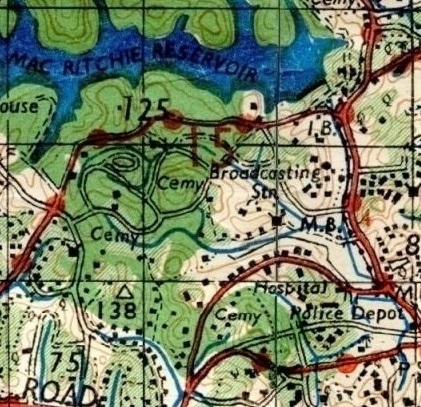
Top: An aerial view of Bukit Brown Cemetery, taken in 1946
Bottom: Detail of Bukit Brown Cemetery on a 1945 map of Singapore, labelled "Cemy"

Bukit Brown Cemetery is located in Novena in the Central Region of Singapore. Built attractions around the cemetery include the Singapore Polo Club and the Old Police Academy. (Note: The Old Police Academy is currently undergoing redevelopment to be integrated with the new Mount Pleasant planning area while a part of Singapore Polo Club was acquired by the Singapore Land Authority for redevelopment.) Bukit Brown Cemetery is bordered by the PIE to the south and Thomson Road to the east, and is bisected by Lornie Highway. Besides Bukit Brown Cemetery, the area within the roads contains multiple other cemeteries of different sizes. Due to this, the terms "Bukit Brown" or "Greater Bukit Brown" can be used to refer to the collection of cemeteries as a whole.

Kampong Kheam Hock or Kheam Hock Village, a kampong village, formerly existed along Kheam Hock Road. In 1949, a municipal survey estimated there were 250 huts at the village whilst in 1984, an estimated 200 families lived there. Kampong Kheam Hock was listed for development in 1984; the village was demolished and its residents were moved to Housing and Development Board (HDB) flats in Potong Pasir and Hougang.

In 2017, SHS released a digital, self-guided trail of Bukit Brown Cemetery called the Bukit Brown Wayfinder. The guide divided a small section of the cemetery into three blocks with signs to direct users to 25 gravestones. Two non-operational Mass Rapid Transit (MRT) stations are located in the Bukit Brown area; Mount Pleasant MRT station, which is planned to be opened together with the Mount Pleasant planning area, and Bukit Brown MRT station, which will open once Bukit Brown Cemetery has been completely redeveloped.

=== Mount Pleasant Cemetery ===
Mount Pleasant Cemetery is located nearby Thomson Road, by the Old Police Academy. Formerly a part of Bukit Brown Cemetery, it was separated from Bukit Brown when the government exhumed six hundred graves in 1993 to widen the PIE. Mount Pleasant Cemetery experiences less visitors annually and is less well-maintained. The cemetery has a pathway leading inside and is popular amongst paranormal groups due to reported sightings of the Pontianak, a mythical creature from Malay folklore that is said to be a vengeful female spirit, originating from women who died during childbirth. Sightings of the Pontianak have been disputed to be monkeys living in the surrounding area.

The Mount Pleasant Cemetery is bordered by the Mount Pleasant planning area to the east. In November 2021, a portion of Mount Pleasant Cemetery was planned to be redeveloped by the HDB, URA, and the Singapore Land Authority to expand the Mount Pleasant planning area. An access road from the PIE was planned to have been built that would have cut through the cemetery. However, the road was later adjusted to be built elsewhere following an environmental evaluation, leaving Mount Pleasant Cemetery unaffected.

=== Seh Ong Cemetery ===
Seh Ong Cemetery was first established sometime in the 1870s. The land which the cemetery is located on was bought by Ong Hew Ko, Ong Ewe Hai, and Ong Chong Chew, who gave it to the Seh Ong Kongsi, a Hokkien clan. The Seh Ong Kongsi used the land as a village for Chinese immigrants before also coming to use the land as a cemetery by the 1870s. In 1919, the Municipal Commission acquired the land. In 1998, the LTA exhumed some graves from Seh Ong Cemetery for upgrading works to the PIE. The total amount of graves between Bukit Brown and Seh Ong is estimated to be around 200,000.

== Traditional practices ==
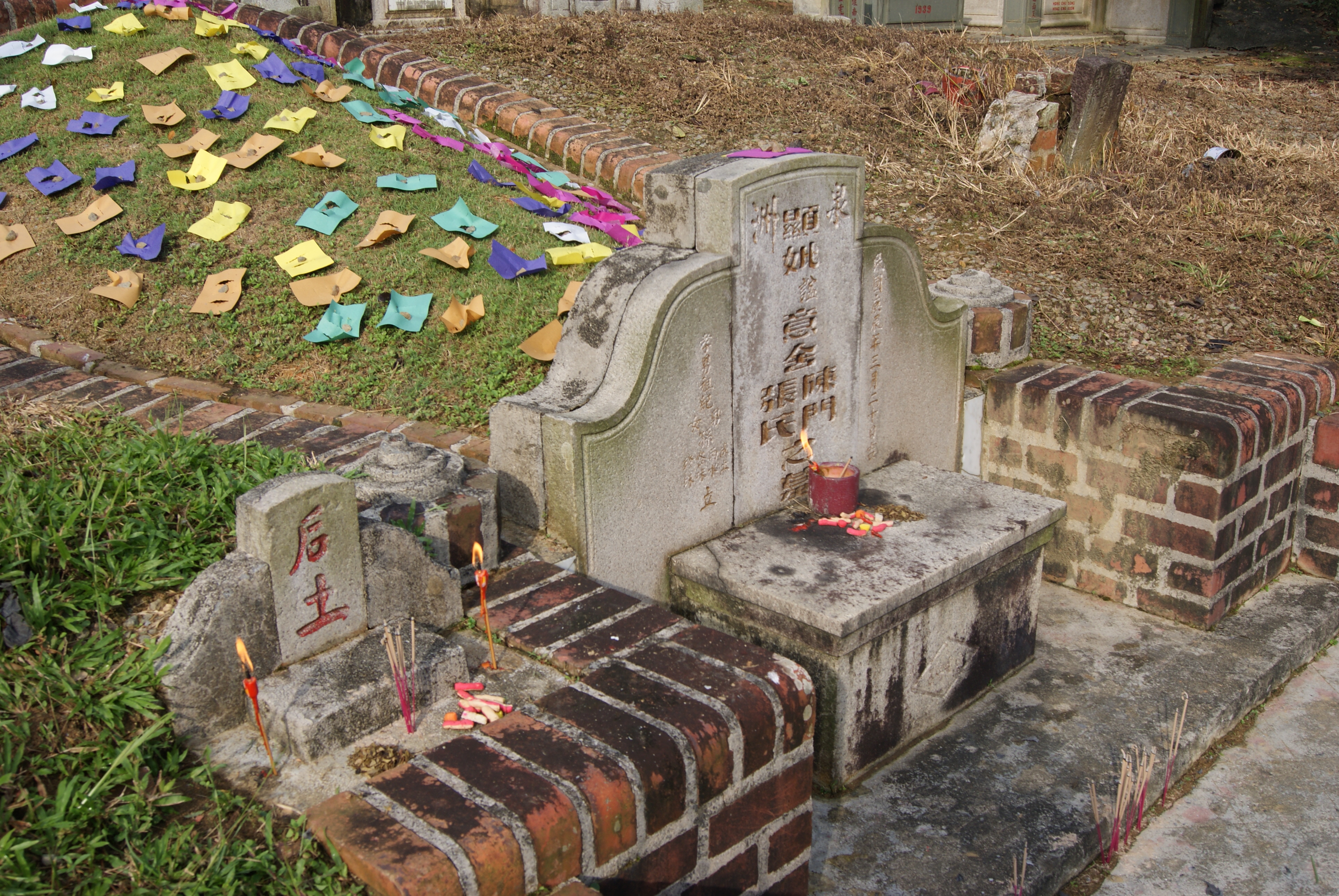
Coloured papers placed on a grave during the Qingming Festival

Due to Bukit Brown Cemetery's high Chinese population, traditional Chinese festivals are held there annually; these include the Qingming Festival, during which traffic police are required to regulate the high traffic flow into the cemetery. During the COVID-19 pandemic, the government advised visitors to Bukit Brown Cemetery and Mandai Crematorium and Columbarium to be in groups of four and to refrain from taking elderly family members with them. In April 2026, NEA called for more responsible burning practices after fires broke out in Bukit Brown during the Qingming Festival due to lit joss sticks and paper.

The Hungry Ghost Festival is another festival that is usually performed by representatives of Chinese temples who, despite having no relation to the deceased, perform rituals and make offerings to them. The representatives regard this as a form of charity because the deceased do not have descendants to perform the rituals for them. The Winter Clothes Festival, held during the tenth Lunar Month, is also held at Bukit Brown Cemetery. Although less commonly practised, it has been held annually since 1996 by the Heng Kang Tian Temple.

== Environment ==
=== Vegetation ===
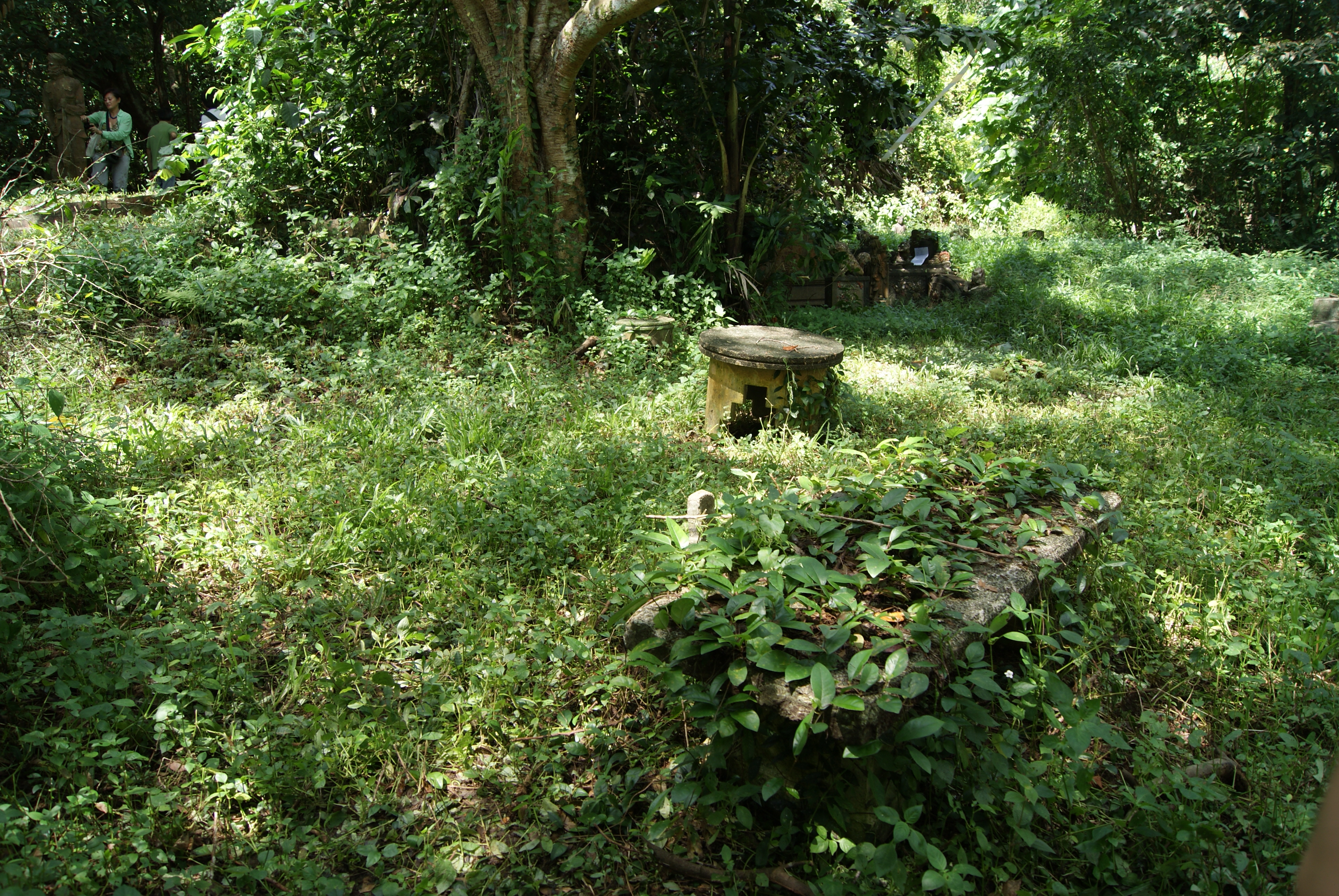
An overgrown bench and table

Due to its dense vegetation, Bukit Brown Cemetery helps to prevent flooding caused by surface runoff and serves as a carbon storage site. In a position paper, the SHS argued that the cemetery should be kept for these reasons. Other organisations requested that the government carry out "a comprehensive environmental impact assessment" of the cemetery; the NSS also carried out a position paper. Plants in the cemetery grounds include Campnosperma auriculatum (terentang) and Macaranga gigantea (giant mahang).

In the 1950s, Bukit Brown Cemetery was cleared of its vegetation, but soon became overgrown again. The cemetery's vegetation has been described as a "neglected space" with an "unrecognisable landscape". In 2014, a bush fire broke out that spread to an area of about "1½ football fields" which took the Singapore Civil Defence Force (SCDF) two hours to put out. A study carried out from 2019 to 2022 by the Lee Kong Chian Natural History Museum (LKCNHM) studied the plants at Bukit Brown Cemetery and surrounding cemeteries, referring to the entire area as Greater Bukit Brown. The area contained 233 species of plants, of which 158 were considered native. Of the 158 native species, 76 are considered nationally threatened. Plant species found at Greater Bukit Brown include:

- Ailanthus integrifolia
- Anodendron candolleanum
- Discospermum malaccense
- Hancea penangensis
- Microcos tomentosa
- Memecylon paniculatum
- Piper baccatum
- Prunus arborea
- Salacia korthalsiana
- Trigonachras acuta
- Xylopia magna

=== Wildlife ===
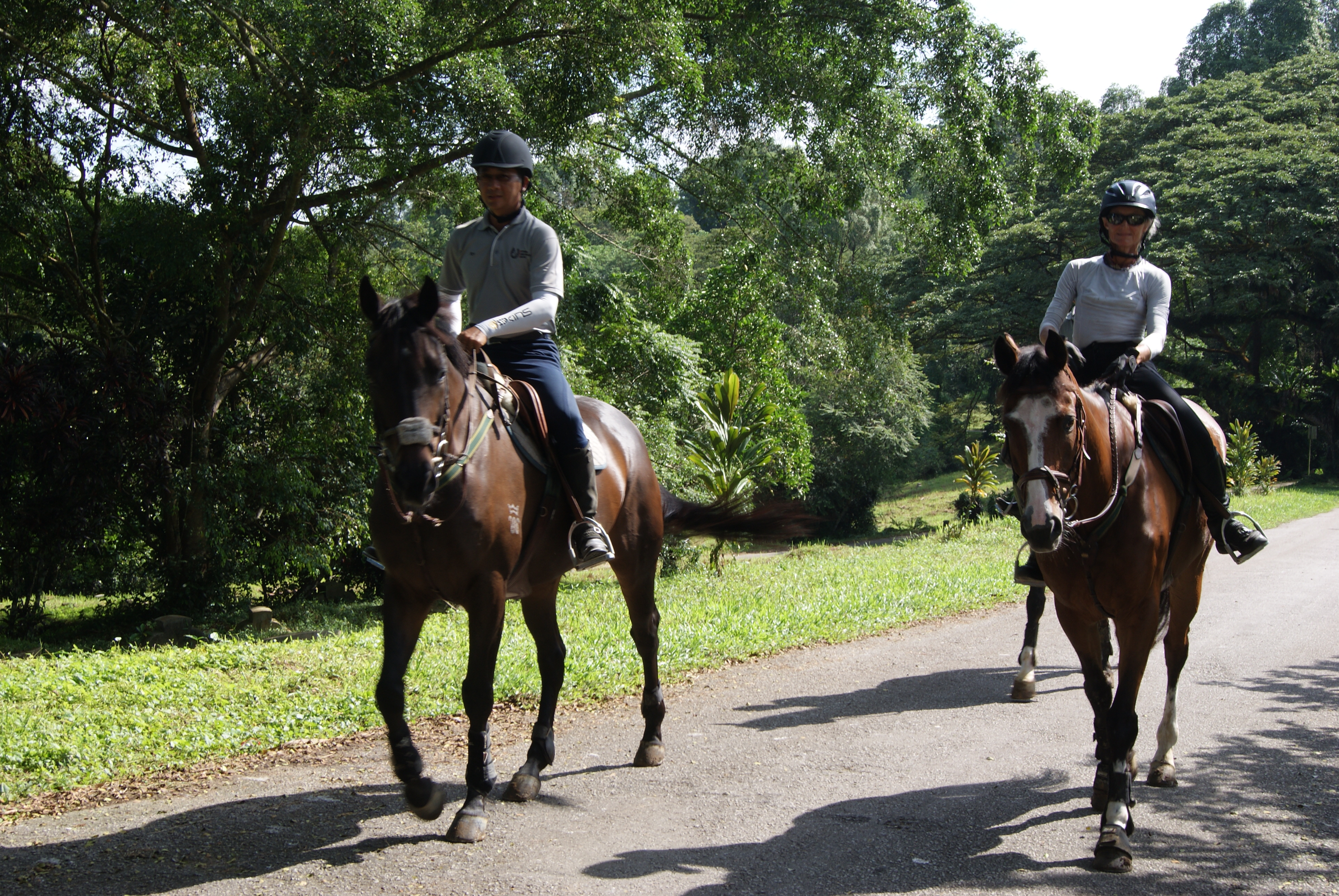
People on horseback at Bukit Brown Cemetery

Bukit Brown Cemetery is known for its wildlife, making it a popular location with photographers, nature lovers, and bird-watchers. The cemetery also serves as a green space for joggers, cyclists, and horse-riders, who are from the nearby Singapore Polo Club. In 2012, NSS recorded 90 resident and migrant birds, along with 48 species of other animals living at the cemetery. Mammals and birds seen at Bukit Brown Cemetery include the white-bellied woodpecker, the changeable hawk-eagle, the Sunda flying lemur, and the large flying fox.

From July 2012 to October 2012, LKCNHM studied fishes in two streams at Bukit Brown Cemetery, called Bukit Brown Stream and Mount Pleasant Stream. Eleven species of fish were found, of which four were considered native. The native fish species were the walking catfish, the Asian swamp eel, the Oxyeleotris marmorata, and the Penang betta. Additionally, from August 2022 to June 2023, six species of frogs were recorded from the Mount Pleasant Stream. The six frogs were the bengal toad, the crab-eating frog, the Malayan giant frog, the four-lined tree frog, the Mukhlesur's chorus frog, and the American bullfrog.

The area also serves as a foraging ground and habitat for wildlife. Animals such as the Pseudotajuria donatana and the Sunda flying lemur from MacRitchie Forest, which is located north of Bukit Brown Cemetery, use the area as an extended foraging ground. Bukit Brown Cemetery also serves to connect animals travelling from MacRitchie to other areas such as Mount Faber, Labrador, and Telok Blangah, which are located south of Bukit Brown.

== Graves ==
=== Architecture and design of graves ===
Graves at Bukit Brown Cemetery were built with a variety of materials from Europe and East Asia, and display traditional building techniques of the 1920s and 1930s. The structure of a grave commonly began with brick, that was typically sourced from Alexandra Brickworks or Jurong Brickworks, before being coated with plaster from Shanghai, China, although it was costly. Bricks from Malaysia's Kluang and Indonesia's Batam were also commonly used. The material culture of graves at Bukit Brown Cemetery show Singapore's position as a global hub at the time, along with the changing tastes of the Chinese community and their incorporation of European and Asian influences.

Graves also represented the varying social statuses of decedents through their decorations. For example, decorative tiles from Europe and Japan were imported by more wealthy Chinese. Other tiles, known as Peranakan tiles, were named after early Chinese immigrants to Singapore, who contributed to Straits Chinese culture. Graves were traditionally built on the sides of hills due to feng shui practices by the Chinese. The decorative tiles were usually made of ceramic, and sported art nouveau or art deco-like floral designs. Early tiles used came from the United Kingdom and Belgium, with later cheaper tiles originating from Japan. Such tiles were originally popular for the use of house decoration. Encaustic tiles originating from England were often used as domestic flooring in households, leading to their use in the flooring of a tomb's terrace.

Wealthier families would feature inscribed stone panels, stone reliefs, and statues by their graves. The materials for these structures came from quarries in Singapore or Malaysia. Additionally, some graves utilised white stone, which was used for statues, and green stone, used for intricate reliefs, that originated from Fujian, China. Shops selling sculpted stones imported from China were commonly found along Kheam Hock Road. Marble headstones with lead lettering imported from Europe were used for those with more "Western tastes". Some graves have oval-shaped ceramic portraits of the deceased on the headstone. Techniques for making these portraits emerged from France; this style reached Singapore around the early 20th-century. Samples of these portraits show that, despite early pieces arriving from Europe, local businesses were eventually able to recreate them.

Architecture of graves

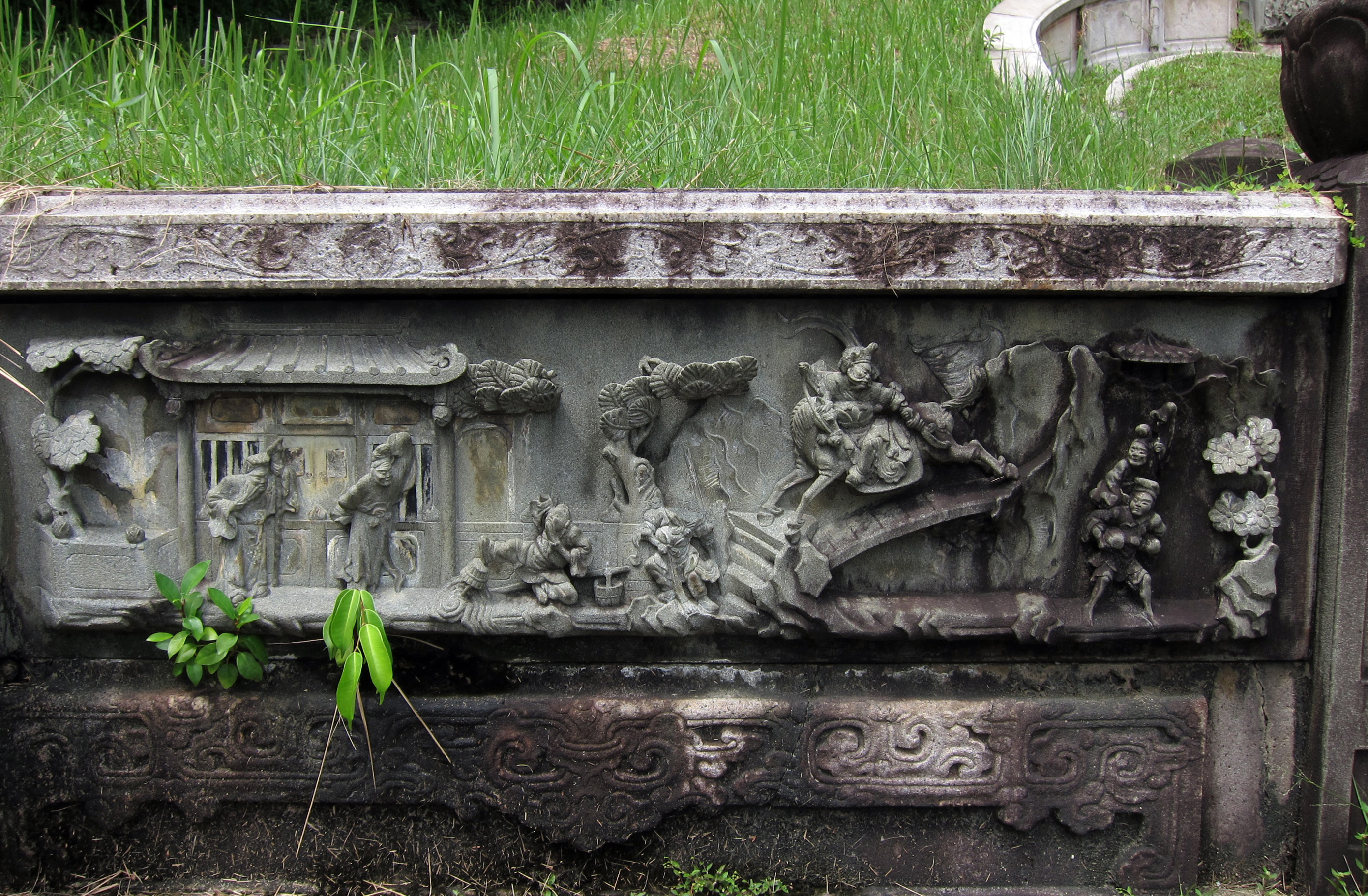
Carvings of the 24 Paragons of Filial Piety on a grave

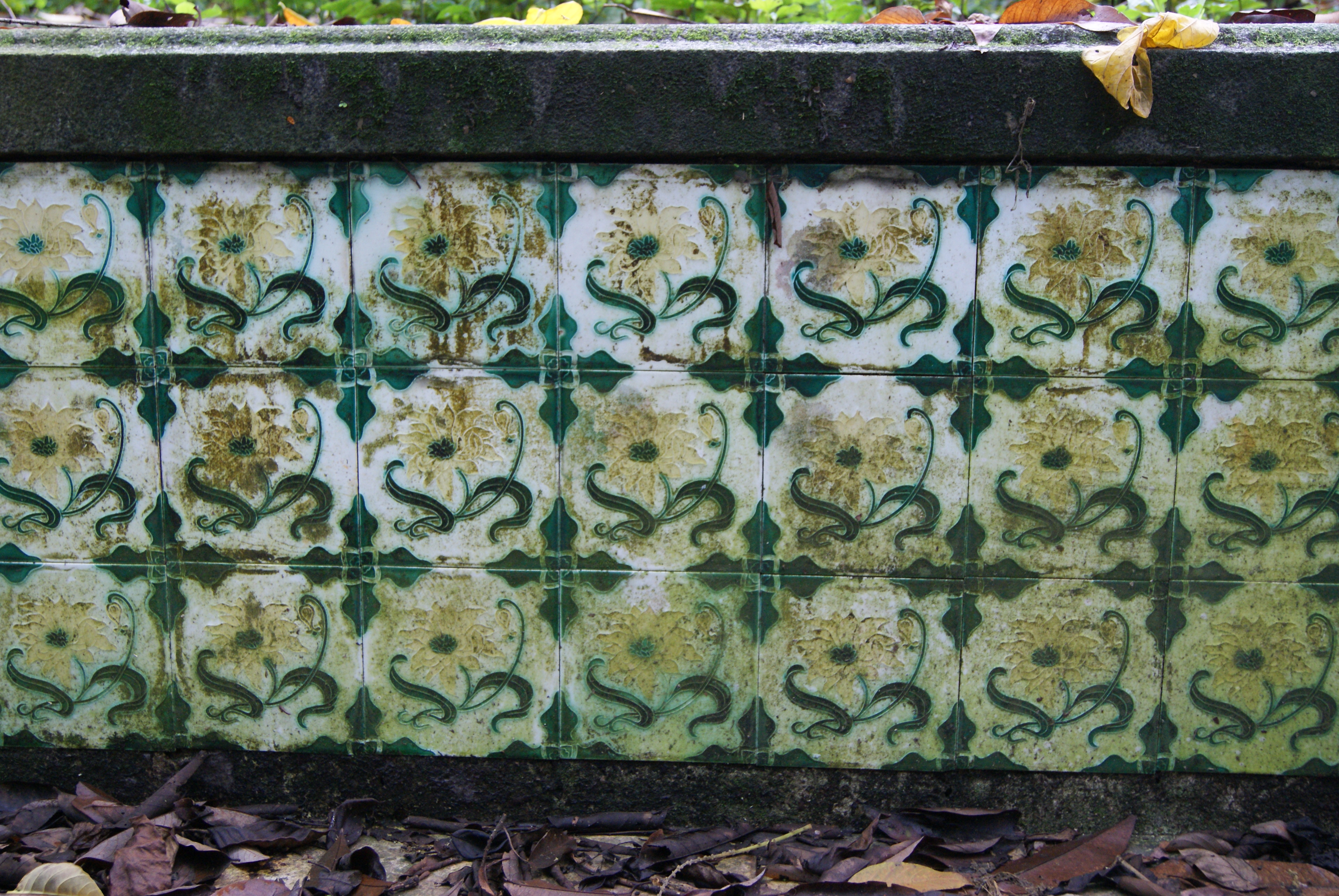
Tiles on the side of a grave with floral designs on them

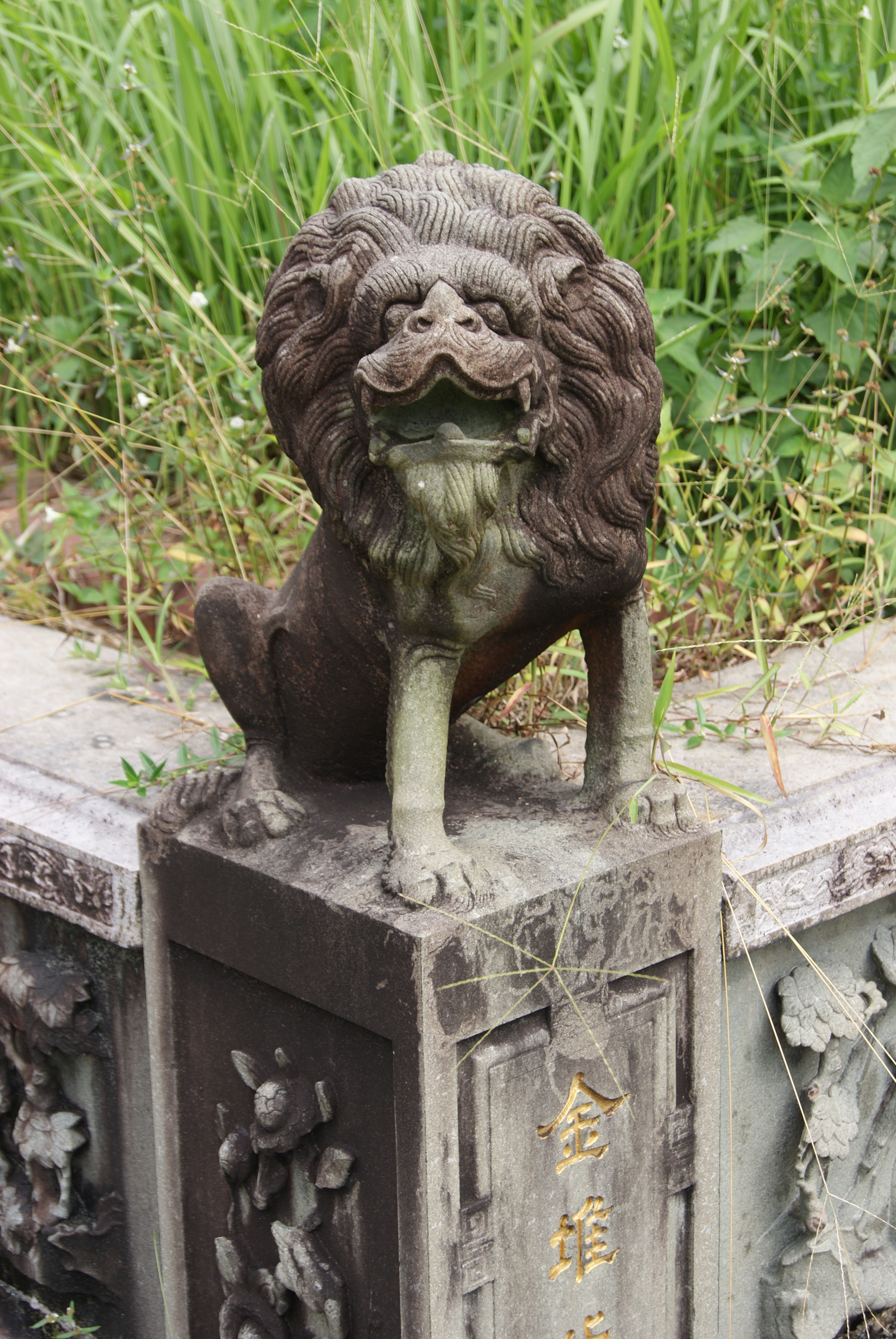
A Chinese stone lion statue on a grave

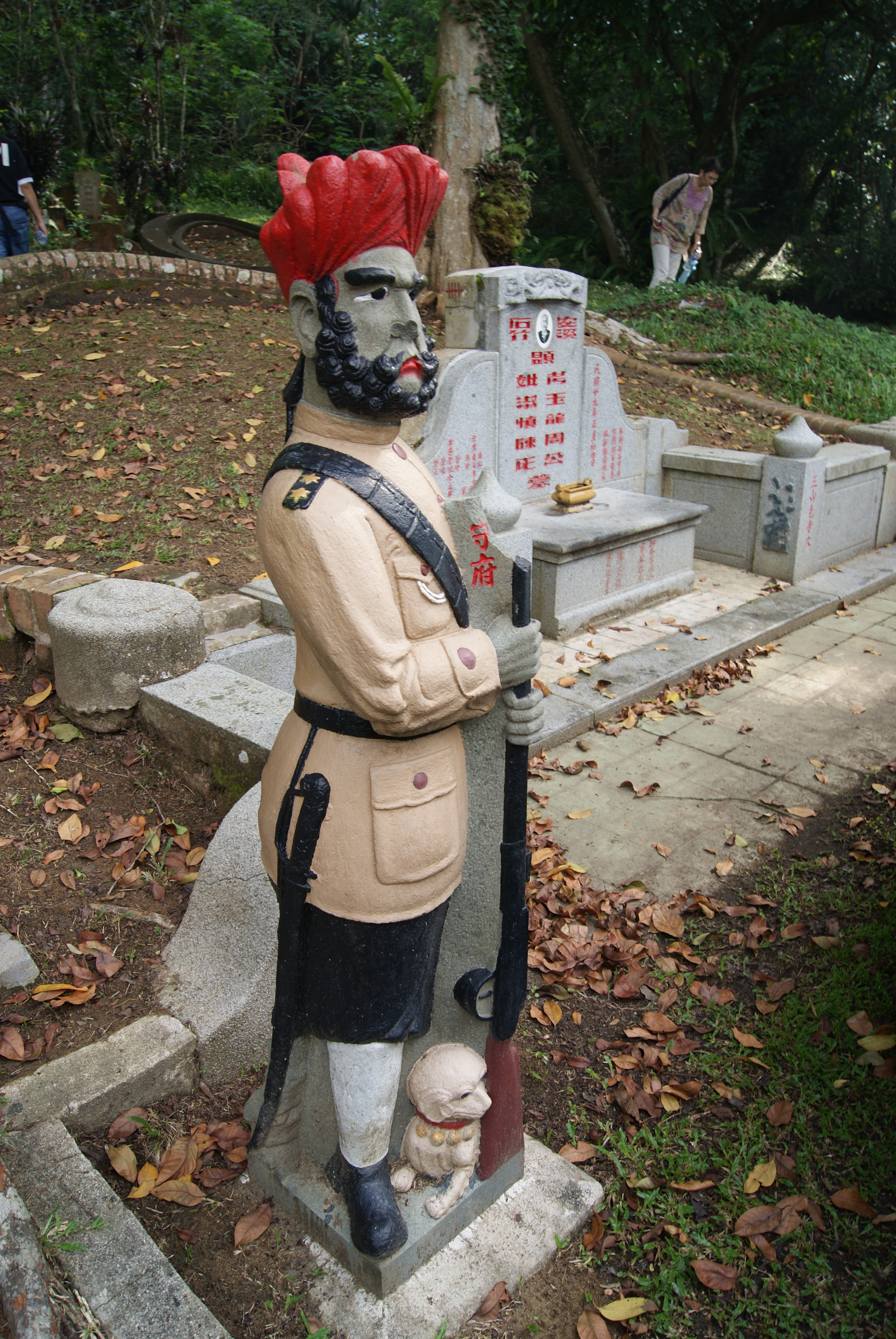
A sepoy statue standing by a grave; these statues were believed to act as guardians to the deceased

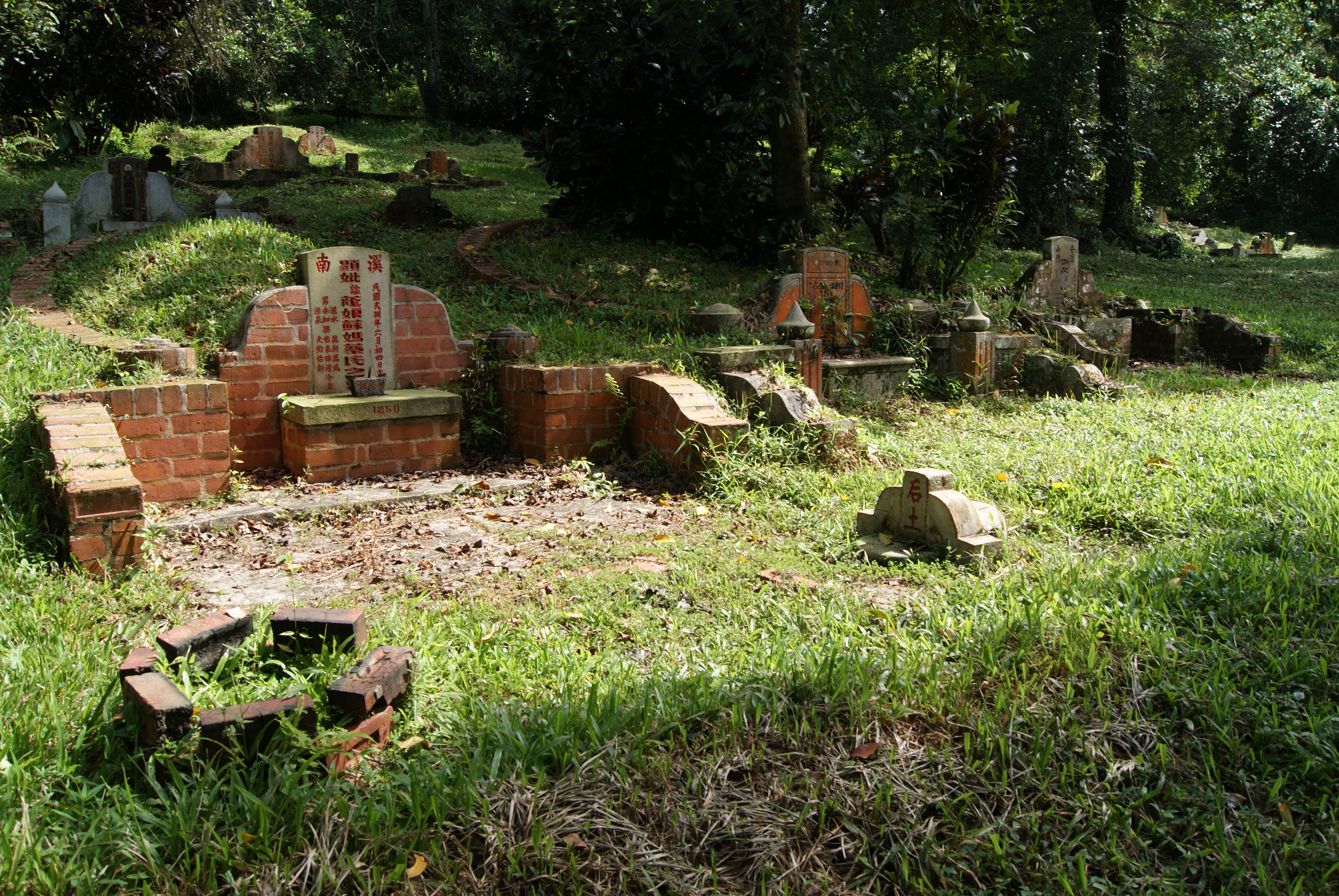
Grave built out of brick

=== Individual gravestones ===
==== Gravestone of Oh Sian Guan and Yap Suan Neo ====
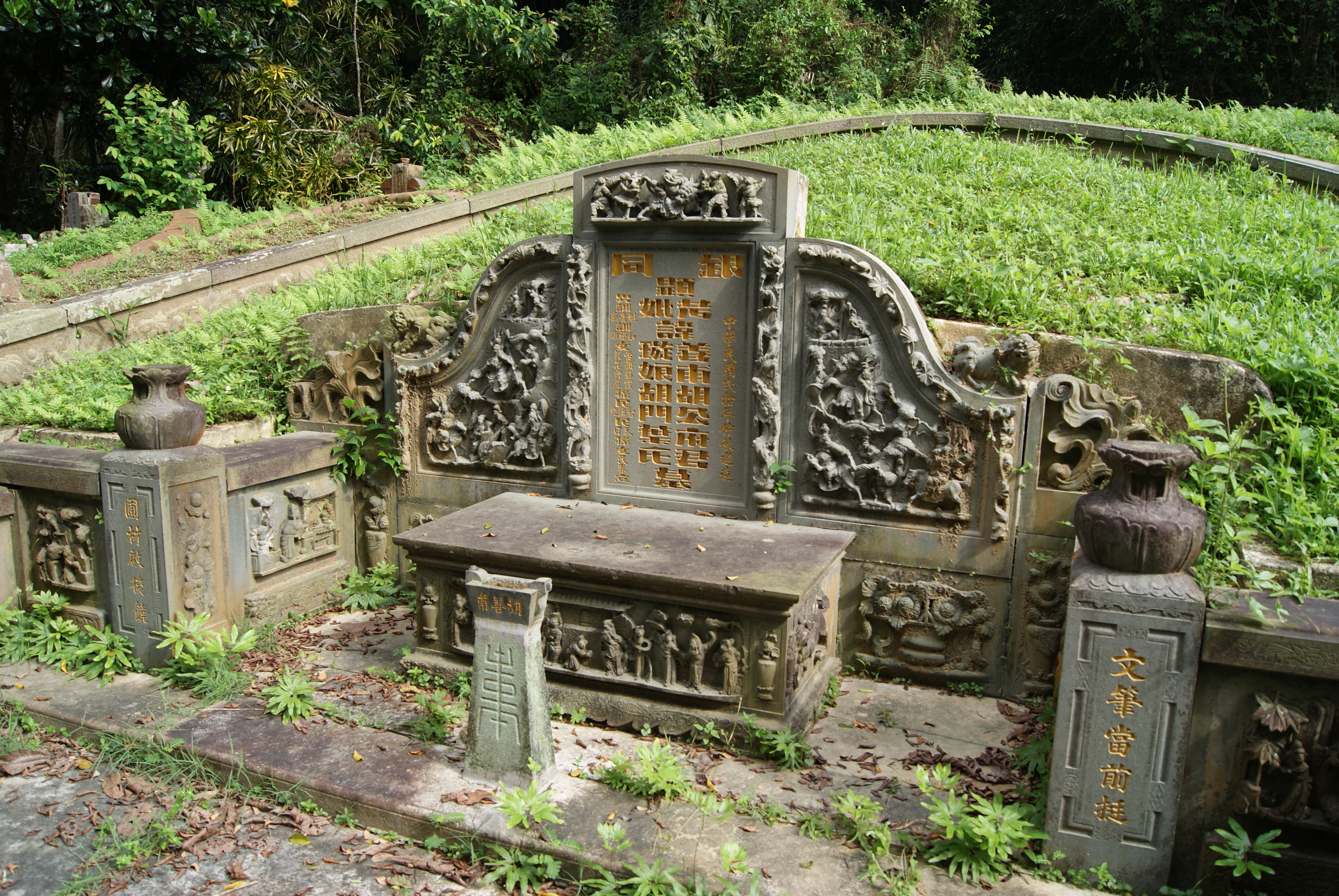
The gravestone of Oh and Yap

Oh Sian Guan (Chinese: 胡先愿; 1874–1943) and Yap Suan Neo (Chinese: 葉璇娘; 1876–1950) were born in Tong'an and Xiamen, respectively. Oh was a banker of Hokkien descent who moved to Singapore in 1907, running a business at Telok Ayer Street called Chin Kiat with Tan Tiong Sing. He later became the founding director of Oversea-Chinese Banking Corporation. His great-grandson is novelist Kevin Kwan. On the left side of their gravestone, there is a carving of the Chinese legend "Madam White Snake Rescues Xu Xian" on the tomb arm. It shows Bai Suzhen approaching the temple where Xu Xian is being held. On the right side of the gravestone, it shows a carving of Chinese folklore character Nezha fighting the Dragon Prince, Ao Guang, at his palace.

==== Gravestone of Ong Sam Leong and his family ====
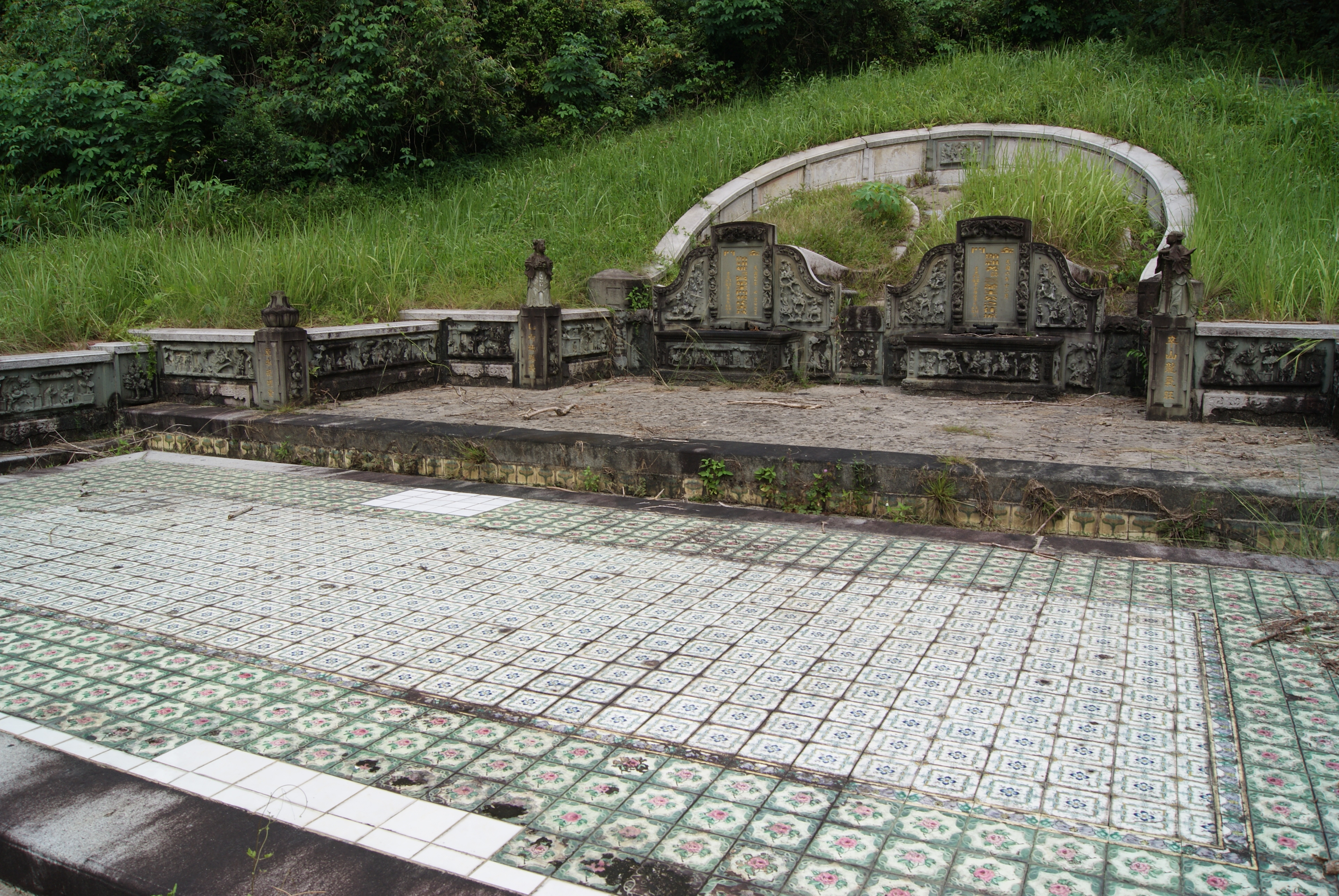
The gravestone of Ong and his family, the largest gravestone in Bukit Brown Cemetery

Ong Sam Leong (Chinese: 王三龙; 1857–1918) was a Straits-born businessman of Perankan descent. Ong owned multiple rubber plantations and sawmills and was known for signing a contract to supply workers to help mine phosphate at Christmas Island, Australia, which made him wealthy. Ong's gravestone is a larger plot located on higher ground; poorer people were given smaller plots by the foot of hills. The Ong family had bought the large plot on the highest hill in the cemetery before it was acquired by the government.

About the size of ten three-room HDB flats, Ong's gravestone is the largest in Bukit Brown Cemetery. Ong was buried with his wife Yeo Hean Neo (楊賢娘), his sons Ong Boon Tat (王文達) and Ong Peng Hock (王平福), and their wives Gwee Soon Neo (魏順娘) and Lim Yeok Quan (林育環), respectively. Ong and Yeo are buried in the main tomb in the centre whilst his sons and their wives are buried in two separate tombs located on the left and right of Ong's tomb. Ong's gravestone is typical of Chinese practices. The granite tiling of Ong's gravestone in the shape of a large half moon is known as the Bright Hall and, according to feng shui practices, gathers qi (气, pronounced "chee") to it. His tomb has two pairs of stone lions and statues of sepoys on either side to "guard" his tomb. Carvings on his gravestone include the story of Guan Lu helping to extend Zhao Yan's lifespan and some of the 24 stories of the Filial Pieties.

==== Gravestone of Lee Hoon Leong ====
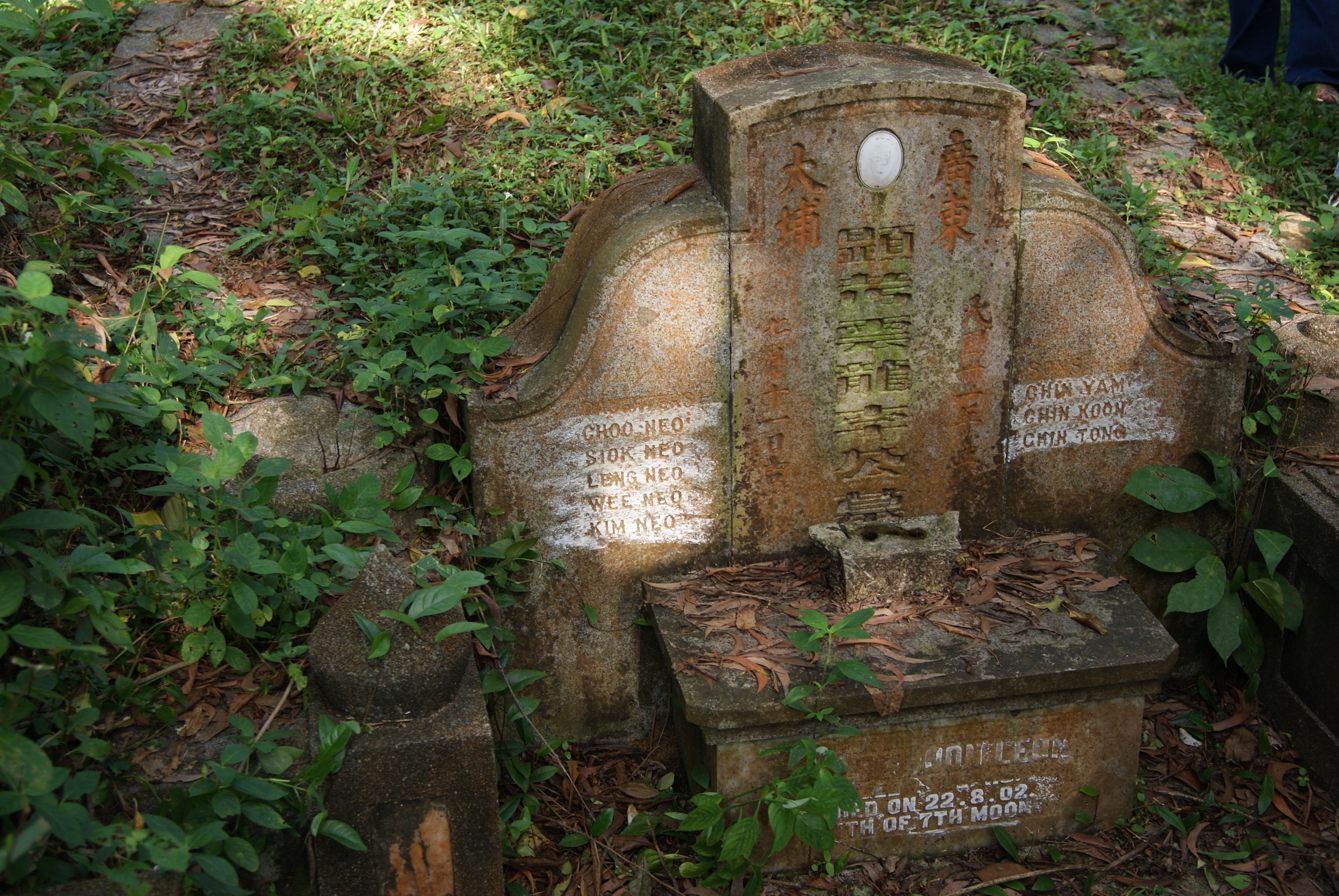
The gravestone of Lee

Lee Hoon Leong (Chinese: 李雲龍; 1871–1942) was a Straits-born Chinese businessman. Lee worked as a pharmacist and purser for the Heap Eng Moh Shipping Line. A member of the political Lee family, he was the father of Lee Chin Koon, grandfather of the first prime minister Lee Kuan Yew, and great-grandfather of the third prime minister Lee Hsien Loong. On his gravestone, his date of death is recorded as 2602, referring to the Japanese calendar's Koki Year. Gravestones recording the date of death using the Koki calendar are common on gravestones built during the Japanese occupation of Singapore, such as Lee's.

== Notable burials ==
Bukit Brown is believed to be the largest Chinese cemetery outside China. It is also the burial place of many of Singapore's earliest pioneers. Notable burials include:

- Tan Lark Sye (1897–1972), Singaporean businessman
- Ong Boon Tat (1888–1941), founder of New World Amusement Park
- Lim Chong Pang (1904–1956), Singaporean businessman and racehorse owner
- Tan Kim Ching (1829–1892), Singaporean politician and businessman
- Cheang Hong Lim (1825–1893), Chinese opium merchant and philanthropist
- Tan Kheam Hock (1862–1922), Singaporean politician
- See Tiong Wah (1886–1940), Singaporean businessman and politician
- Gan Teong Tat (1878–1969), Malaysian merchant and politician
- Lee Choo Neo (1895–1947), Singaporean physician
- Tay Koh Yat (1880–1957), Singaporean entrepreneur
- Tan Ean Kiam (1881–1943), Hokkien businessman and founder of OCBC Bank
- Chew Boon Lay (1851 or 1852–1933), Chinese businessman and namesake of Boon Lay
- Gan Eng Seng (1844–1899), Chinese philanthropist
- Koh Hoon Teck (1878–1956), Peranakan musician
- Khoo Kay Hian (1878–1966), Singaporean broker and founder of UOB-Kay Hian
- Chew Geok Leong (died 1939), Chinese physician and former Qing dynasty official
- Tan Boo Liat (1881–1934), Singaporean businessman and philanthropist

== See also ==
- Former cemeteries in Singapore
- Bukit Brown MRT station, a Mass Rapid Transit station named after Bukit Brown Cemetery
