= 2014 World Monuments Watch =

The World Monuments Watch is a flagship advocacy program of the New York-based private non-profit organization World Monuments Fund (WMF) that calls international attention to cultural heritage around the world that is threatened by neglect, vandalism, conflict, or disaster.

== 2014 Watch List ==
The 2014 Watch List was published on 8 October 2013.

| Country/Territory | Site | Location |
|---|---|---|
| Argentina | Church and Monastery of St. Catherine of Siena | Buenos Aires |
| Armenia | Bardzrakash St. Gregory Monastery | Dsegh, Lori Province |
| Belgium | Collegiale Sainte-Croix de Liege | Liège |
| Brazil | Serra da Moeda | Minas Gerais |
| Chile | Elevators of Valparaíso | Valparaíso |
| Chile | Palacio la Alhambra | Santiago |
| China | Pokfulam Village | Hong Kong (SAR) |
| Colombia | Ancient Ridged Fields of the San Jorge River Floodplain | Córdoba and Sucre Departments |
| Comoros | Funi Aziri Bangwe | Ikoni, Grande Comore |
| Ecuador | Remigio Crespo Toral Museum | Cuenca, Azuay Province |
| Egypt | Bayt Al-Razzaz | Cairo |
| Ethiopia | Yemrehanna Kristos | Amhara Region |
| France | Churches of Saint Merri and Notre-Dame-De-Lorette | Paris |
| Germany | Gaslight and Gas Lamps of Berlin | Berlin |
| Guatemala | Uaxactun | Petén Department |
| Guyana | Georgetown City Hall | Georgetown |
| India | Historic City of Bidar | Karnataka |
| India | House of Shaikh Salim Chishti | Fatehpur Sikri, Agra, Uttar Pradesh |
| India | Juna Mahal | Dungarpur, Rajasthan |
| Indonesia | Ngada Villages of Flores | Flores, Nusa Tenggara |
| Indonesia | Peceren and Dokan Villages | Karo District, North Sumatra |
| Indonesia | Trowulan | Mojokerto, East Java |
| Iraq | Khinnis Reliefs | Kurdistan Region |
| Italy | Farnese Aviaries | Rome |
| Italy | Historic Center of L'Aquila | L'Aquila, Abruzzo |
| Italy | Muro dei Francesi | Ciampino, Province of Rome, Lazio |
| Italy | Venice | Veneto |
| Japan | East Japan Earthquake Heritage Sites | Tōhoku and Kantō Regions |
| Japan | Sanro-Den of Sukunahikona Shrine | Ōzu, Ehime Prefecture, Shikoku |
| Jordan | Damiya Dolmen Field | Damiya, Jordan Valley |
| Kenya | Lamu Old Town | Lamu |
| Macedonia | Monastery of Poloshko | Kavadarci Municipality |
| Mali | Cultural Heritage Sites of Mali | |
| Mexico | Fundidora Park | Monterrey, Nuevo León |
| Mexico | Retablos de Los Altos de Chiapas | San Cristóbal de las Casas and Teopisca, Chiapas |
| Mozambique | Island of Mozambique | Nampula Province |
| Myanmar | Yangon Historic City Center | Yangon |
| Nigeria | Osun-Osogbo Sacred Grove | Osogbo, Osun State |
| Pakistan | Shikarpoor Historic City Center | Shikarpoor Municipality |
| Palestinian Territory | Ancient Irrigated Terraces of Battir | Bethlehem Governorate, West Bank |
| Peru | Capilla de la Virgen Concebida de Kuchuhuasi | Quispicanchi, Cusco |
| Peru | Cerro Sechín | Casma, Ancash |
| Peru | Chan Chan | Trujillo, La Libertad |
| Peru | Gran Pajatén | Mariscal Cáceres, San Martín |
| Portugal | Fort of Graça | Elvas, Alentejo |
| Portugal | Joanine Library of the University of Coimbra | Coimbra |
| Puerto Rico | Henry Klumb House | San Juan |
| Romania | Great Synagogue of Iaşi | Iaşi |
| Romania | Wooden Churches of Northern Oltenia and Southern Transylvania | Northern Oltenia and Southern Transylvania |
| Singapore | Bukit Brown | |
| Spain | Güell Pavilions and Garden | Barcelona |
| Spain | Iglesia Parroquial San Pedro Apóstol | Buenache de Alarcón, Cuenca |
| Syria | Cultural Heritage Sites of Syria | |
| Tanzania | Christ Church Cathedral and Former Slave Market Site | Stone Town, Zanzibar |
| Tanzania | Dar es Salaam Historic Center | Dar es Salaam |
| Tanzania | House of Wonders and Palace Museum | Stone Town, Zanzibar |
| Turkey | Cathedral of Mren | Digor, Kars |
| United Kingdom | Battersea Power Station | London |
| United Kingdom | Deptford Dockyard and Sayes Court Garden | London |
| United Kingdom | Grimsby Ice Factory and Kasbah | Grimsby, Lincolnshire |
| United Kingdom | Sulgrave Manor | Sulgrave, Northamptonshire |
| United States | Chinati Foundation | Marfa, Texas |
| United States | The Cloisters and Palisades | New York and New Jersey |
| United States | George Nakashima House, Studio and Workshop | Bucks County, Pennsylvania |
| United States | Gateway Arch National Park (Jefferson National Expansion Memorial) | St. Louis, Missouri |
| United States | Taliesin | Spring Green, Wisconsin |
| Venezuela | Ciudad Universitaria de Caracas | Caracas |
