= Tan Kheam Hock =

Singaporean politician

- 陈谦福
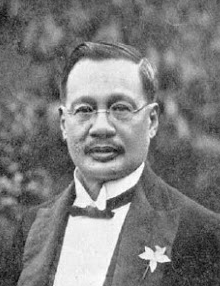
- Tan in One Hundred Years' History of the Chinese in Singapore (1923)
- Born: 18 June 1862; Penang, Straits Settlements
- Died: 21 April 1922 (aged 59); Singapore, Straits Settlements
- Resting place: Bukit Brown Cemetery

Tan Kheam Hock (Chinese: 陈谦福; 18 June 1862 – 21 April 1922) was a Singaporean politician and businessman. He was a member of the Municipal Commission of Singapore and several other organisations and a director of various companies.

== Early life and education ==
Tan was born in Penang on 18 June 1862. His father was Tan Teng Pong, a prominent and wealthy merchant. He attended the Penang Free School.

== Career ==
After graduating from the Penang Free School, he was employed at the Penang branch of the Mercantile Bank of India, London and China. After spending eight years at the bank, he moved to Kolkata, where he established a produce business. After spending two years there, he moved to Singapore in 1889 and joined the syndicate which monopolised spirit and opium farms until 1906. In the 1890s, he translated various Chinese works into Baba Malay.

In December 1901, he became the labour contractor for the Tanjong Pagar Dock Company, which later became the Singapore Harbour Board. In 1910, he was made a member of the Municipal Commission of Singapore, and advocated for the establishment of Bukit Brown Cemetery. In 1912, he was made a Justice of the Peace. He was the chairman of the Eastern United Assurance Co. Ltd..

He was the chairman or the director of various other companies, including Singapore Traders Ltd., Liberty Hall Ltd., Jesselton Ice Co., Sime, Darby & Co., Lunas Rubber Estates Ltd., Scudai Ltd., Muar Rubber Ltd., Craigielea Plantations Ltd., Indragiri Rubber Ltd., Titi Tin Ltd., Lingui Tin Ltd. and Singapore Building Corporation Ltd.. He was a committee or council member of the Chinese Advisory Board, the Singapore Po Leung Kuk, the Straits Chinese British Association, and the King Edward VII College of Medicine.

== Personal life and death ==
Tan was married and had nine sons, including Tan Chong Chew and Tan Chong Khee, and two daughters. He lived in the Penang Cot mansion on River Valley Road.

Tan died on 21 April 1922 after suffering an Apoplectic seizure. He was buried in the Alexandra Road Cemetery and his remains were later re-interred at the Bukit Brown Cemetery.

Kheam Hock Road was named after him.
