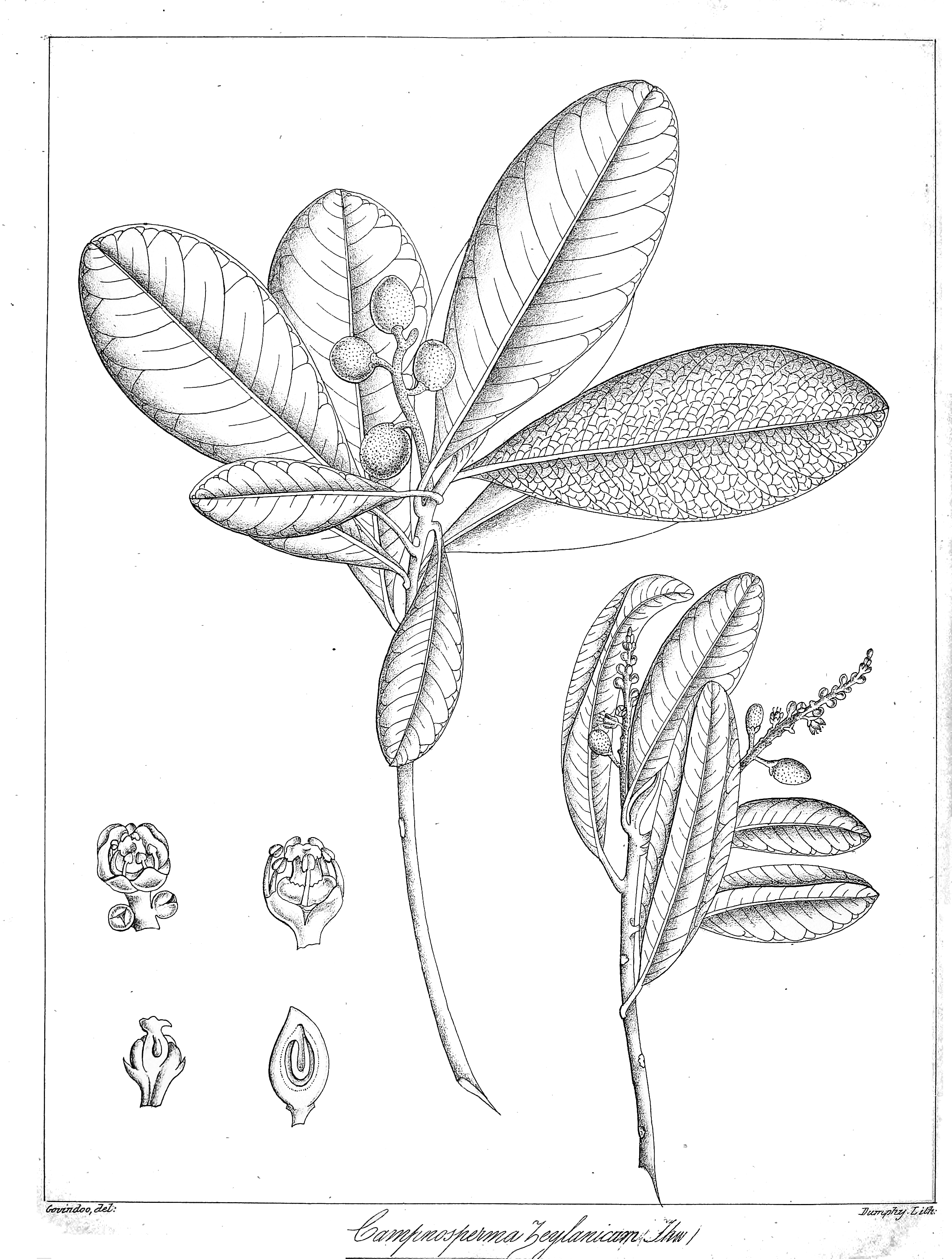
- from The Flora Sylvatica for Southern India

Conservation status
- Vulnerable (IUCN 2.3)

Scientific classification
- Kingdom: Plantae
- Clade: Tracheophytes
- Clade: Angiosperms
- Clade: Eudicots
- Clade: Rosids
- Order: Sapindales
- Family: Anacardiaceae
- Genus: Campnosperma
- Species: C. zeylanicum

Binomial name
- Campnosperma zeylanicum Thwaites

= Campnosperma zeylanicum =

Species of tree

Campnosperma zeylanicum is a species of flowering plant in the family Anacardiaceae. It is endemic to Sri Lanka.

== Culture ==
Known as අරිද්ද (aridda) in Sinhala.
