= Campnosperma coriaceum =

Conservation status
- Least Concern (IUCN 3.1)

Scientific classification
- Kingdom: Plantae
- Clade: Tracheophytes
- Clade: Angiosperms
- Clade: Eudicots
- Clade: Rosids
- Order: Sapindales
- Family: Anacardiaceae
- Genus: Campnosperma
- Species: C. coriaceum

Binomial name
- Campnosperma coriaceum (Jack) Hallier f. ex Steenis

Synonyms
- Coelopyrum coriaceum Jack; Buchanania macrophylla Blume; Buchanania racemiflora Miq.; Campnosperma griffithii Marchand; Campnosperma macrophyllum (Blume) Hook.f.

Species of flowering plant

Campnosperma coriaceum is a plant in the family Anacardiaceae. It is native to tropical Asia.

== Description ==
Campnosperma coriaceum grows as a tree up to 40 m (130 ft) tall with a trunk diameter of up to 90 cm (35 in). It has buttress roots, up to 2 m (7 ft) high, as well as stilt roots and pneumatophores. The brown bark may be cracked or scaly. The leathery leaves are obovate, oblong or elliptic and measure up to 36 cm (14 in) long and up to 15 cm (6 in) wide. The inflorescences, in panicles, feature yellow-green flowers. The ovoid fruits, ripening black, measure up to 1.8 cm (0.7 in) long.

== Taxonomy ==
Campnosperma coriaceum was first described as Coelopyrum coriaceum in 1822 by Scottish botanist William Jack in Malayan Miscellanies. In 1948, Dutch botanist Cornelis van Steenis transferred the species to the genus Campnosperma. The type specimen was collected in Sumatra. The specific epithet coriaceum means 'leathery', referring to the leaves.

== Distribution and habitat ==
Campnosperma coriaceum is native to Thailand, Sumatra, Peninsular Malaysia, Borneo and New Guinea. Its habitat is in swamps or in dipterocarp forests, at elevations to about 500 m (1,600 ft).

== Conservation ==
Campnosperma coriaceum has been assessed as least concern on the IUCN Red List. However, the species' swamp and lowland forest habitat is threatened by conversion for agricultural and urban development purposes. The species is not present in any protected areas.

== Uses ==
In Papua New Guinea, the timber of Campnosperma coriaceum is used for lightweight items. The wood produces an oil that is locally applied as an insect repellent and for skin decoration.
