= Campnosperma seychellarum =

Conservation status
- Critically Endangered (IUCN 3.1)

Scientific classification
- Kingdom: Plantae
- Clade: Tracheophytes
- Clade: Angiosperms
- Clade: Eudicots
- Clade: Rosids
- Order: Sapindales
- Family: Anacardiaceae
- Genus: Campnosperma
- Species: C. seychellarum

Binomial name
- Campnosperma seychellarum Marchand

Species of tree

Campnosperma seychellarum is a species of plant in the family Anacardiaceae. It is endemic to Seychelles. It is threatened by habitat loss.
