= Lim Chong Pang =

Singaporean businessman and racehorse owner (1904–1956)

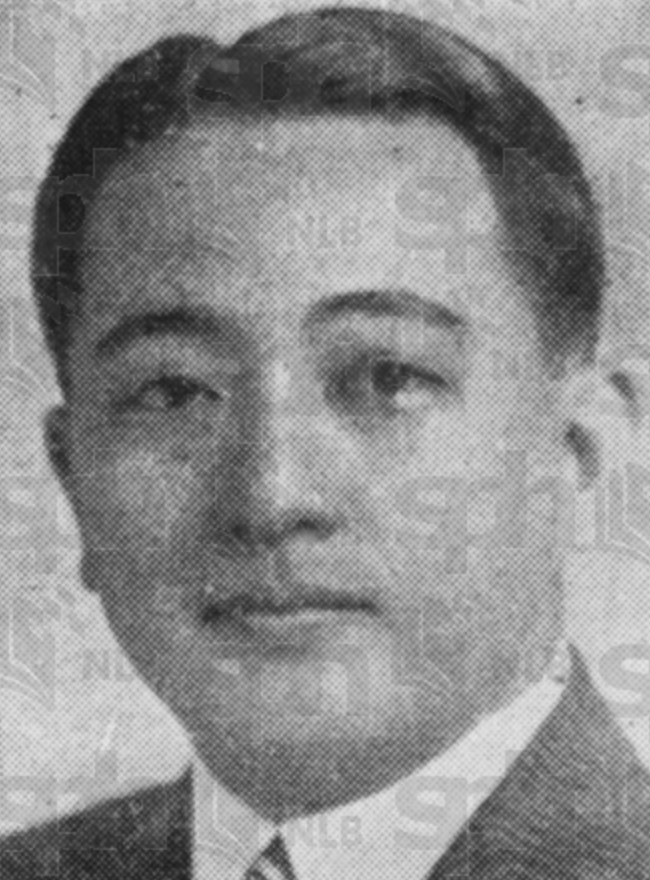
Lim Chong Pang

Lim Chong Pang (Chinese: 林忠邦; 6 June 1904 — 21 July 1956) was a Singaporean businessman and a racehorse owner. He was a member of the Singapore Rural Board from 1929 to 1938.

== Early life and education ==
Lim was born in Singapore on 6 June 1904. He was the son of rubber tycoon Lim Nee Soon. He attended the Saint Andrew's School in Singapore and St Stephen's College in Hong Kong.

== Career ==
After graduating from college, Lim returned to Singapore in 1920 and took over his father's business, diversifying it into various other areas including property and estate management. He leased out residential plots in the Westhill Estate to labourers involved in the construction of a naval base for 50 cents per month. He was also involved in the construction of a bridge over the Seletar River. In 1929, he became a member of the Singapore Rural Board, and was the youngest member of the board. He retired from the board in December 1938. In the same year, he renamed the Apollo Theatre in Geylang to the Garrick Theatre. In the following year, he was made a Justice of the Peace. He also established the Sultan Theatre in the Westhill Estate. He was also a committee member of the Chinese Chamber of Commerce, and the honorary treasurer for the Oleh Oleh Party, which had been established to assist the War Fund. He and his family left for Bangalore, India a few days before the Fall of Singapore.

Lim was a prominent figure in the Singapore film industry. In 1945, he established the South-East Asia Film Company. He served as the president of the Indian Motion Picture Distributors Association of Singapore, as well as a board member of the Cinematograph Exhibitors Association of Singapore and the Federation of Malaya. He also served as the director of the Overseas Assurance Corporation, a member of the board of governors of Saint Andrew's School, the vice-president of the school's Old Boys Association, a committee member of the St Hilda's School, a trustee of the Gan Eng Seng Free School and a member of the Board of Visitors of the St John’s Island Quarantine Station.

== Personal life and death ==
Lim married Lee Poh Neo, the daughter of businessman Lee Choon Guan. He was a prominent racehorse owner. His horses won more than 100 races from 1946 to 1956, and he served the vice-president of the Owners and Trainers Association of Malaya.

Lim died on 21 July 1956, and his funeral was held on 23 July. He was buried in the Bukit Brown Municipal Cemetery. Following his death, the government renamed Westhill Estate to Chong Pang Village.
