= Tay Koh Yat =

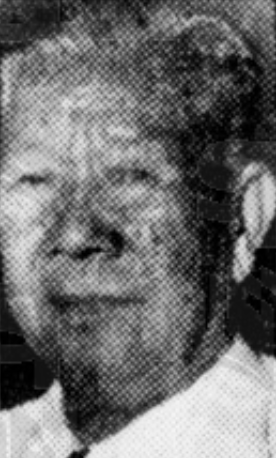
Tay in 1953

Tay Koh Yat (1880 — 29 January 1957) was an entrepreneur and a leader of the Chinese community in Singapore.

== Early life ==
Tay was born in Kinmen in 1880. He came to Singapore at the age of 22.

== Career ==
In 1910, he joined Chop Guan Seng Hin. In 1912, he established the Guan Soon Company. He established the Aik Seng Hin Company in 1921. The following year, he established the Chin Joo Seng Company, which imported Indonesian produce into Singapore. He established the Tay Koh Yat Bus Company in 1938. The company had become the largest Chinese bus company in Singapore by 1949.

In 1941, he was made the commander of the Chinese Civil Defence. Prior to the Fall of Singapore, he fled to Indonesia, where he remained for the rest of the war. During the Japanese occupation of Singapore, he was the second on the "most wanted" list of the Japanese. He returned to Singapore after the end of the war and began compiling a list of members of the Chinese Civil Defence who had been killed in the war. He then requested compensation from the government to the members' families.

In the 1947, he was appointed the chairman of the Singapore Chinese Massacre Appeal Committee, which sought to prosecute Japanese war criminals. In the following year, he was awarded the Certificate of Honour, and was elected as the chairman of the board of the Chung Shing Jit Pao. In the following year became the president of the Thong Chai Medical Institution. He was on the board of directors of the Singapore Chinese Chamber of Commerce, and served as the chairman of the Kim Mui Hoey Kuan. In December 1950, he was awarded the OBE.

== Death ==
He died on 29 January 1957. His funeral procession followed the route of the buses owned by his company before arriving at the Bukit Brown Cemetery, where he was buried.
