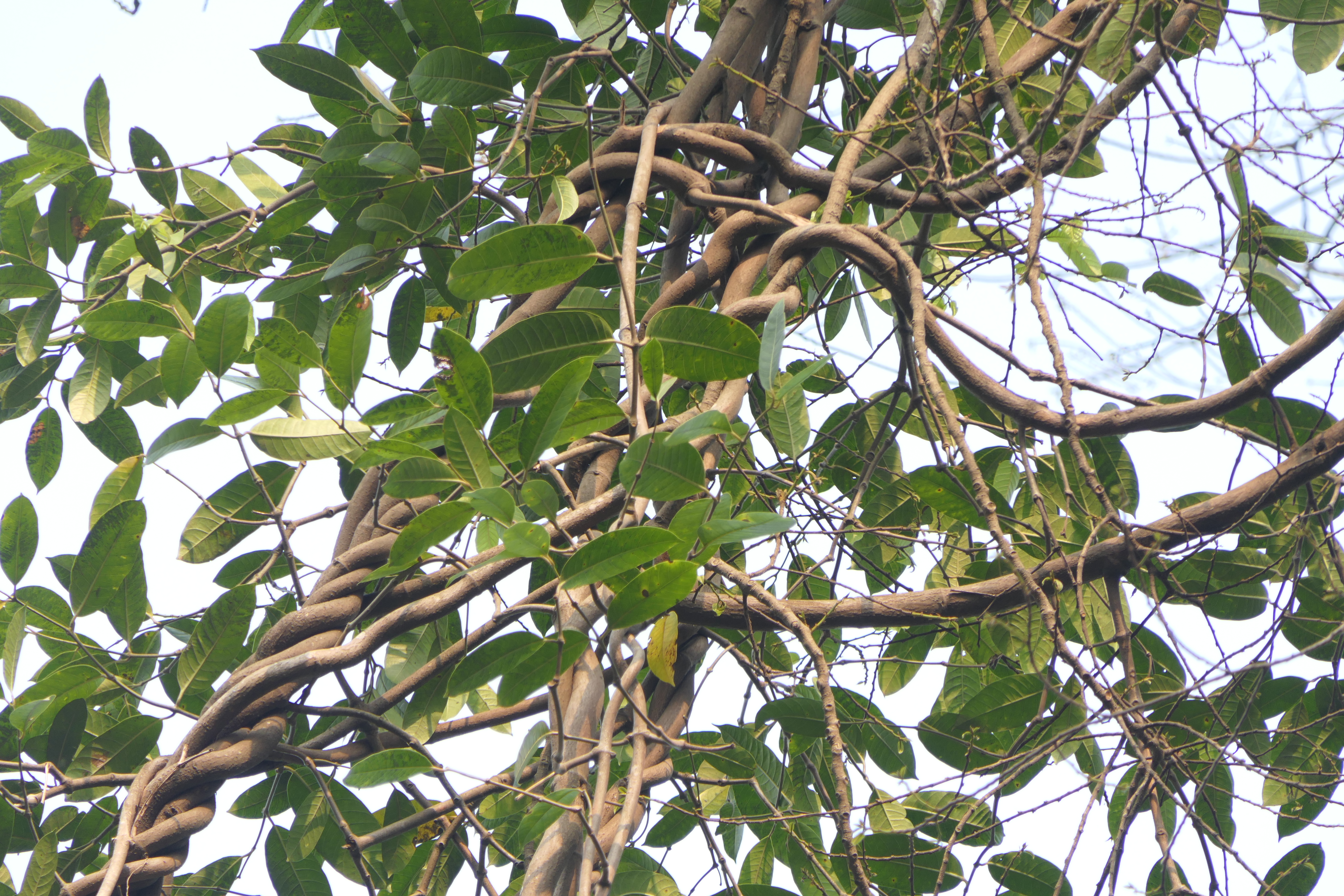

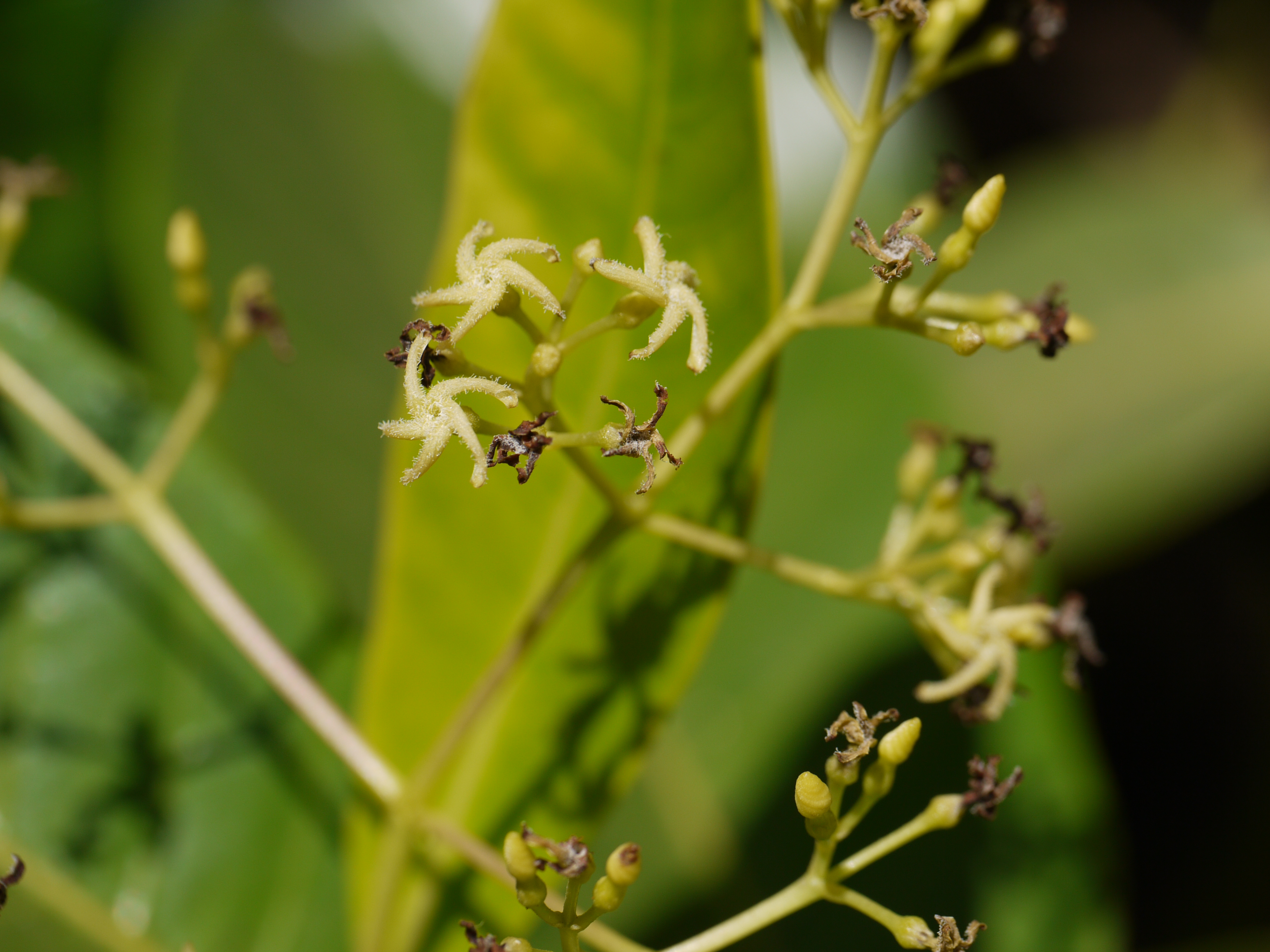

Scientific classification
- Kingdom: Plantae
- Clade: Tracheophytes
- Clade: Angiosperms
- Clade: Eudicots
- Clade: Asterids
- Order: Gentianales
- Family: Apocynaceae
- Genus: Anodendron
- Species: A. parviflorum

Binomial name
- Anodendron parviflorum (Roxb.) I.M.Turner

Synonyms
- Anodendron lanceolatum King & Gamble; Anodendron manubriatum (Wall. ex Steud.) Merr.; Anodendron moluccanum Miq.; Anodendron paniculatum A.DC.; Anodendron rhinosporum Thwaites; Anodendron sutepense Kerr; Anodendron tenuiflorum (Miq.) Miq.; Echites manubriatus Wall. ex Steud.; Echites paniculatus Roxb., nom. illeg.; Echites parviflorus Roxb.; Echites polyanthus Wall., nom. nud.; Echites trichotomus Desf., nom. rej.; Epigynum parviflorum (Roxb.) Hook.f.; Gymnema nepaulense J.Graham; Ichnocarpus paniculatus Moon, nom. nud.; Strophanthus balansae Franch.; Tabernaemontana tenuiflora Miq.

= Anodendron parviflorum =

Species of plant

Anodendron parviflorum is a species of flowering plant in the family Apocynaceae, native to tropical Asia. It was first described by William Roxburgh in 1832 as Echites parviflorus.

== Distribution ==
Anodendron parviflorum is found in most of tropical Asia, from the Indian subcontinent through Indochina to Malesia.

== Conservation ==
Anodendron rhinosporum was assessed as "critically endangered" in the 1998 IUCN Red List, where it is said to be native only to south-west Sri Lanka. As of February 2023, this species is regarded as a synonym of Anodendron parviflorum, which has a very much wider distribution throughout tropical Asia.
