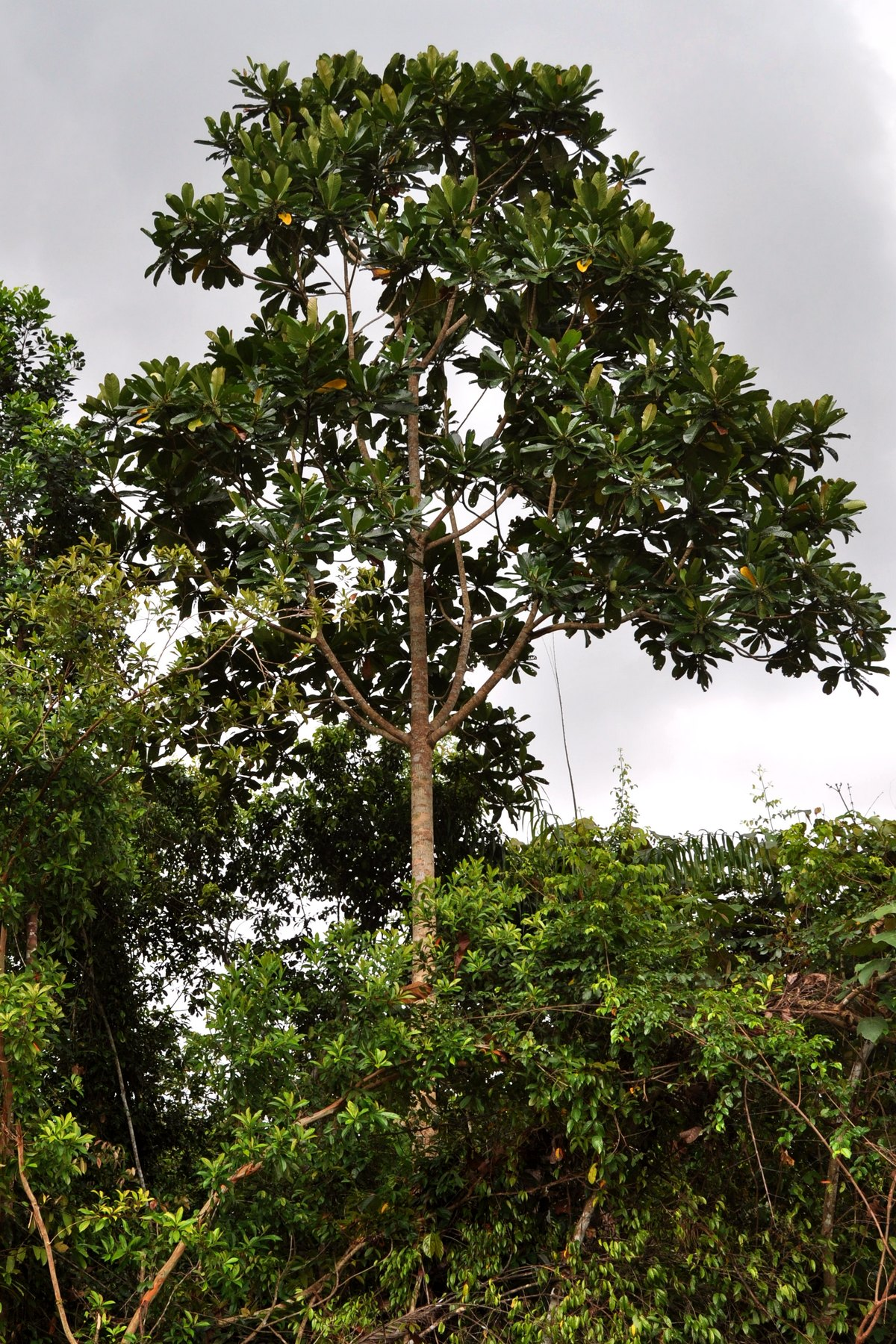
- Campnosperma auriculatum in Sumatra

Scientific classification
- Kingdom: Plantae
- Clade: Tracheophytes
- Clade: Angiosperms
- Clade: Eudicots
- Clade: Rosids
- Order: Sapindales
- Family: Anacardiaceae
- Subfamily: Anacardioideae
- Genus: Campnosperma; Thwaites

Synonyms
- Coelopyrum Jack; Cyrtospermum Benth.; Drepanospermum Benth.

= Campnosperma =

Genus of flowering plants

Campnosperma is a genus of rainforest trees in the Cashew Family (Anacardiaceae). They are found in the East Indies, south Asia and the Seychelles.

== Species ==
As of July 2020, the Plants of the World Online accepts 14 species:

- Campnosperma auriculatum (Blume) Hook.f.
- Campnosperma brevipetiolatum Volkens
- Campnosperma coriaceum (Jack) Hallier f.
- Campnosperma gummiferum (Benth.) Marchand
- Campnosperma lepidotum Capuron ex Randrianasolo & J.S.Mill.
- Campnosperma micranteium Marchand
- Campnosperma montanum Lauterb.
- Campnosperma panamense Standl.
- Campnosperma parvifolium Capuron ex J.S.Mill. & Randrianasolo
- Campnosperma schatzii Randrianasolo & J.S.Mill.
- Campnosperma seychellarum Marchand
- Campnosperma squamatum Ridl.
- Campnosperma zacharyi Randrian. & Lowry
- Campnosperma zeylanicum Thwaites
