= Campnosperma squamatum =

Conservation status
- Least Concern (IUCN 3.1)

Scientific classification
- Kingdom: Plantae
- Clade: Tracheophytes
- Clade: Angiosperms
- Clade: Eudicots
- Clade: Rosids
- Order: Sapindales
- Family: Anacardiaceae
- Genus: Campnosperma
- Species: C. squamatum

Binomial name
- Campnosperma squamatum Ridl.

Synonyms
- Campnosperma minus Corner

Species of tree

Campnosperma squamatum is a tree in the cashew and sumac family Anacardiaceae. The specific epithet squamatum means 'scaly', referring to the leaf surface.

== Description ==
Campnosperma squamatum grows as a tree up to 25 metres (80 ft) tall with a trunk diameter of up to 55 cm (22 in). Its yellowish-grey bark is smooth to scaly. The flowers are greenish yellow. The roundish fruits measure up to 1.7 cm (1 in) in diameter and are coloured green and white when fresh. The tree is a food source for gibbons in Sabangau National Park in Kalimantan.

== Distribution and habitat ==
Campnosperma squamatum grows naturally in Peninsular Malaysia, Singapore and Borneo. Its habitat is in lowland areas: in swamps, kerangas forests and hill forests up to 600 m (2,000 ft) altitude.
