= Jurong Brickworks =

- Industry: Brick making industry
- Predecessor: Sin Chow Kee
- Founder: Wee Thiam Gee (1887–1934)
- Defunct: 2005; 21 years ago
- Successor: Chan Wah Chip|Koh Eng Poh
- Subsidiaries: JBW Enterprise|Jurong Tile Works

Jurong Brickworks (Chinese: 裕廊砖厂; pinyin: Yù láng zhuān chǎng) was a private brick manufacturing plant located in Singapore's Jurong area. Originally known as Sin Choon Kee Brickworks (新春记; Xīn chūn jì), it was renamed Jurong Brickworks in the 1930s after being acquired by Chan Wah Chip and Koh Eng Poh. The plant, which was located at 13 milestone, later moved to 11 milestone, and became one of Singapore's largest private brick makers, producing over three million bricks per month in the 1970s.

It was closed down in 2005 to make way for the Tengah New Town development.

== History ==
During the 1930s, the plant's sales were affected by an economic downturn caused by the fall of rubber prices. After a closure of seven to eight months, the plant's owner, Wee Thiam Ghee, died at the age of 47 on 21 January 1934. Shortly after, Chan Wah Chip and Koh Eng Poh bought over the plant and increased production to 750,000 bricks per month. The bricks were mainly supplied to British colonial military departments, Singapore harbour board, and the Singapore Improvement Trust.

=== World War 2 ===
During Japanese occupation in World War II, production at the plant ceased, and most of the workers left. However, one employee, Wan Hong Cheong, was paid as a foreman to manage the empty brick kilns. After seven months, the Japanese military took over the operation and management of the plant and hired back a portion of the workers to produce around 1000 bricks per week. Production remained low compared to before, and the workers were given 15kg of rice per month for their work.

=== 1970s ===
In the late 1970s, the plant had over 50 shareholders and 140 workers. It switched to using fully automated brick making machines, which helped increase production to over three million bricks per month. In addition to its brickmaking work, it held two other subsidiaries: Jurong Tile Works, which manufactured and sold tiles and clay products, and JBW Enterprise, an investment holding company. In 1983, Jurong Brickworks announced its plan to be publicly listed on the Singapore Stock Exchange, offering to put up four million shares for sale to the public but its application was turned down by SES. Jurong Brickworks' legacy includes its contribution to the construction industry in Singapore and its eventual expropriation by the government in the early 21st century.

=== Production ===
Initially, brickmaking was a labour-intensive process that involved several manual steps. Workers dug a pit into the top layer of the soil and added water to it. Then, they employed the use of cows or buffaloes to step on the soil until it became a 'gluey paste.' Once the clay was ready, workers would manually mould the bricks, which were then left to dry until most of their moisture had evaporated. Finally, they were sent to a man-made kiln to heat up, a process known as the "open-mouth kiln" in Chinese, which later changed to the British "red hair kiln." With the advent of fully automated brick-making machines, the raw materials were mixed using machines, and the bricks were printed into blocks, enabling a production of up to 100,000 bricks a day.
