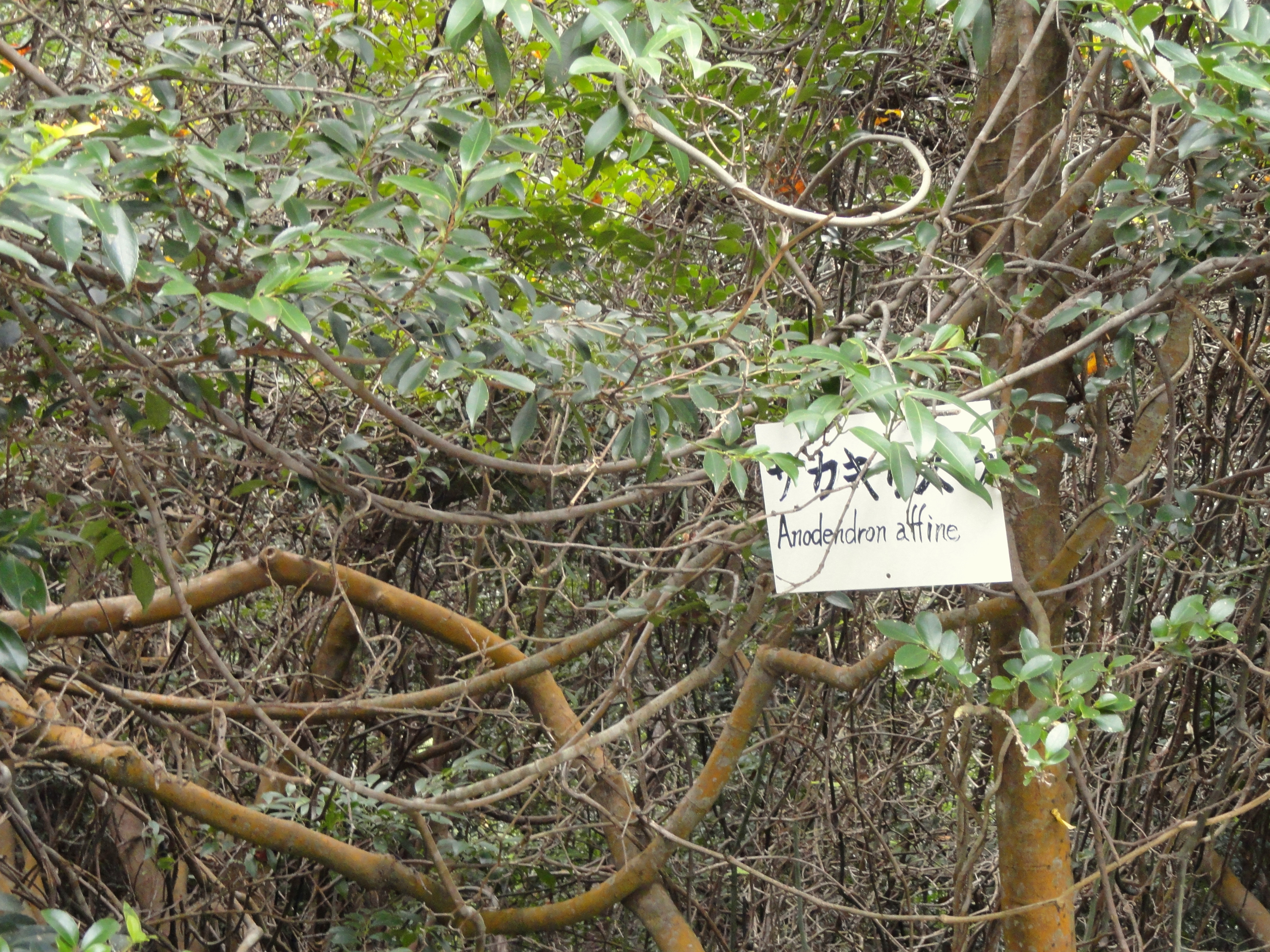
- Anodendron affine

Scientific classification
- Kingdom: Plantae
- Clade: Tracheophytes
- Clade: Angiosperms
- Clade: Eudicots
- Clade: Asterids
- Order: Gentianales
- Family: Apocynaceae
- Subfamily: Apocynoideae
- Tribe: Apocyneae
- Genus: Anodendron; A.DC.

Synonyms
- Anadendron Wight, unintentional typo; Formosia Pichon

= Anodendron =

Genus of flowering plants

Anodendron is a genus of plant in the family Apocynaceae first described as a genus in 1844. It is native to most of tropical Asia: China, the Indian subcontinent, Southeast Asia, New Guinea, and some islands of the western Pacific.

== Species ==
As of February 2023, Plants of the World Online accepted the following species:

1. Anodendron affine (Hook. & Arn.) Druce - China (Fujian, Guangdong, Guangxi, Guizhou, Hainan, Hubei, Hunan, Sichuan, Taiwan, Yunnan, Zhejiang), Japan, Ryukyu Islands, Philippines, Vietnam, Laos, Thailand, Myanmar, Bangladesh
2. Anodendron axillare Merr. - Philippines, Borneo, W Malaysia, Java, Sumatra
3. Anodendron benthamianum Hemsl. - Taiwan
4. Anodendron borneense (King & Gamble) D.J.Middleton - Borneo, Palawan
5. Anodendron candolleanum Wight - Thailand, W Malaysia, Borneo, Java, Sumatra, Philippines
6. Anodendron coriaceum (Blume) Miq. - Thailand, W Malaysia, Borneo, Java, Bali, Lombok, Timor, Flores
7. Anodendron gracile (King & Gamble) D.J.Middleton - Borneo, Palawan, W Malaysia
8. Anodendron howii Tsiang - Guangxi, Hainan
9. Anodendron nervosum Kerr - Yunnan, Assam, Laos, Thailand, Vietnam, Java, Sumatra
10. Anodendron oblongifolium Hemsl. - Borneo, Philippines, Maluku, New Guinea, Bismarck Archipelago, Solomon Islands, Vanuatu
11. Anodendron parviflorum (Roxb.) I.M.Turner – tropical Asia
12. Anodendron pauciflorum Hook.f - Borneo, W Malaysia, Sumatra
13. Anodendron punctatum Tsiang - Cambodia, Thailand, Guangxi, Hainan, Sichuan
14. Anodendron seramense D.J.Middleton - Maluku
15. Anodendron tubulosum (Ridl. ex Burkill & M.R.Hend.) D.J.Middleton - W Malaysia, Sumatra
16. Anodendron whitmorei D.J.Middleton - Maluku, New Guinea, Solomon Islands
17. Anodendron wrayi King & Gamble - W Malaysia
