= Khinnis Reliefs =

Assyrian rock relief in Iraq

Coordinates: 36.757630°N 43.417360°E

- Bavian Reliefs
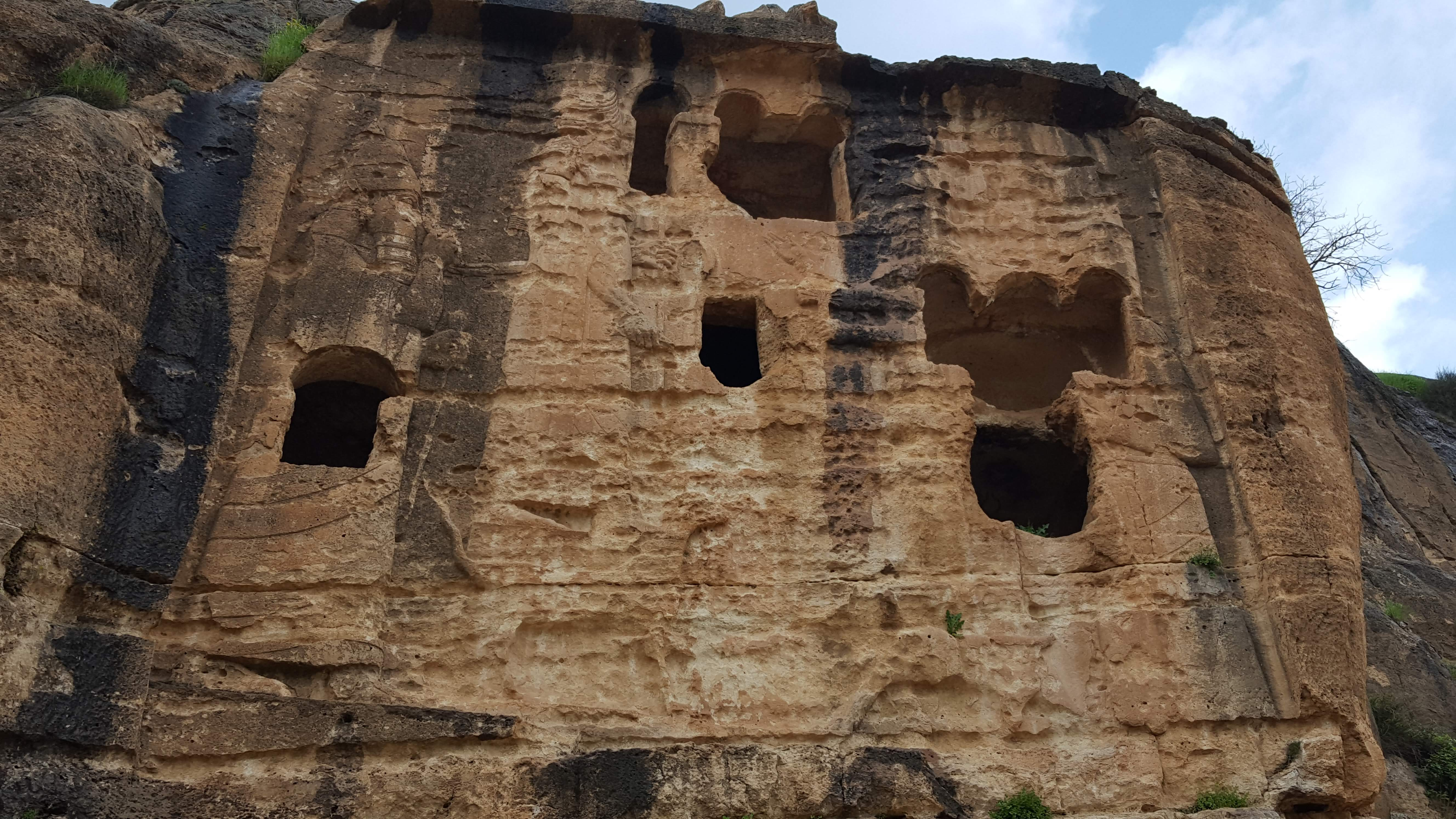
- Rock reliefs at Khinnis
- Interactive map of Khinnis Reliefs
- Type: Rock reliefs
- Cultures: Neo-Assyrian Empire
- Location: Duhok Governorate, Iraq
- Region: Kurdistan Region

History
- Built: Around 690 BCE
- Built by: Sennacherib

Site notes
- Management: Directorate of Antiquities of Dohuk

Khinnis is an Assyrian archaeological site, also known as Bavian (its neighbouring village), in Duhok Governorate in the Kurdistan Region of Iraq. It is notable for its rock reliefs, built by king Sennacherib around 690 BC. This was later repurposed as a hermitage used by monks of the Church of the East in ancient times.

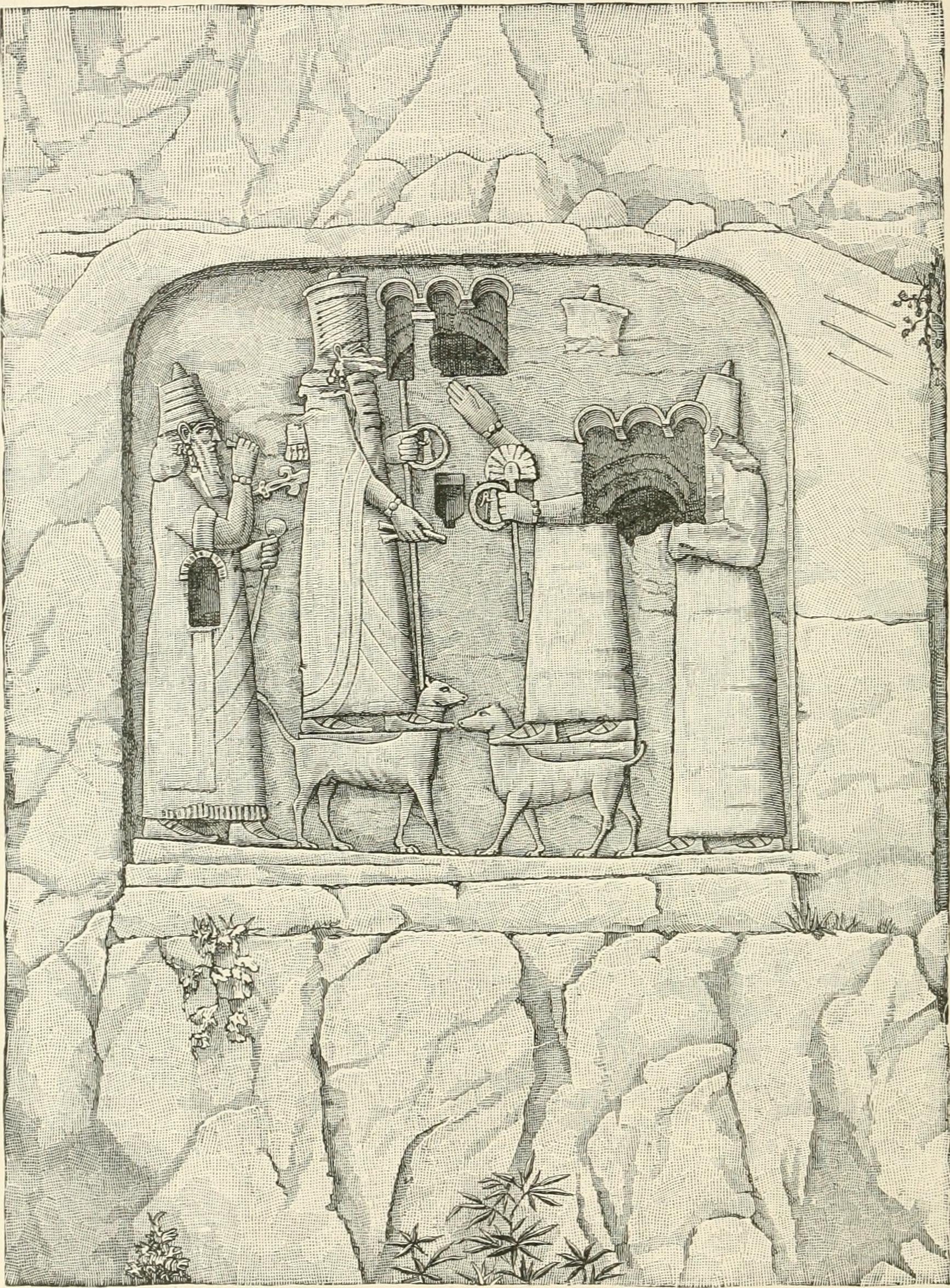
Reliefs of Bavian (after Layard) as included in J.H.Wright's 1905 book of universal history

During the reign of Sennacherib (705–681 BC), Khinnis was built in order to "celebrate the construction of a complex system of canals whose aim was to supply the capital of the empire, Nineveh, and its hinterland with water", according to the World Monuments Fund. The reliefs face the River Gomel River, and an inscription records the construction of a hydraulic system built by Sennacherib. The construction of the monument therefore had a propagandistic purpose for the Assyrian king.

Austin Henry Layard was the first Western scholar to describe the site in 1853. Layard stated that Khinnis had been discovered by Simon Rouet, the French consul in Mosul.

The rock reliefs and tombs at Khinnis are noted by the Duhok Governorate's website to be "the finest ancient rock carvings in the Badinan Region". According to Langendorfer (2012), the site's Great Relief is "the largest single Assyrian sculpture in existence, which depicts a pair of gods attended by the duplicated figure of the Assyrian king".

Langendorfer notes that in the site's inscriptions, "Sennacherib emphasizes his ingenious technical ability to manipulate water for the benefit of the Assyrian state, either through the creative irrigation of the Assyrian heartland and the new capital, or the destructive flooding and leveling of Babylon".

The Directorate of Antiquities of Dohuk is in charge of the site, and the Land of Nineveh Archaeological Project of the University of Udine has been recording the rock reliefs with a laser scanner.

To help revive tourism and preserve heritage, workers cleared debris from the site, installed benches, cleaned the tunnel waterways and added solar-powered lights.
