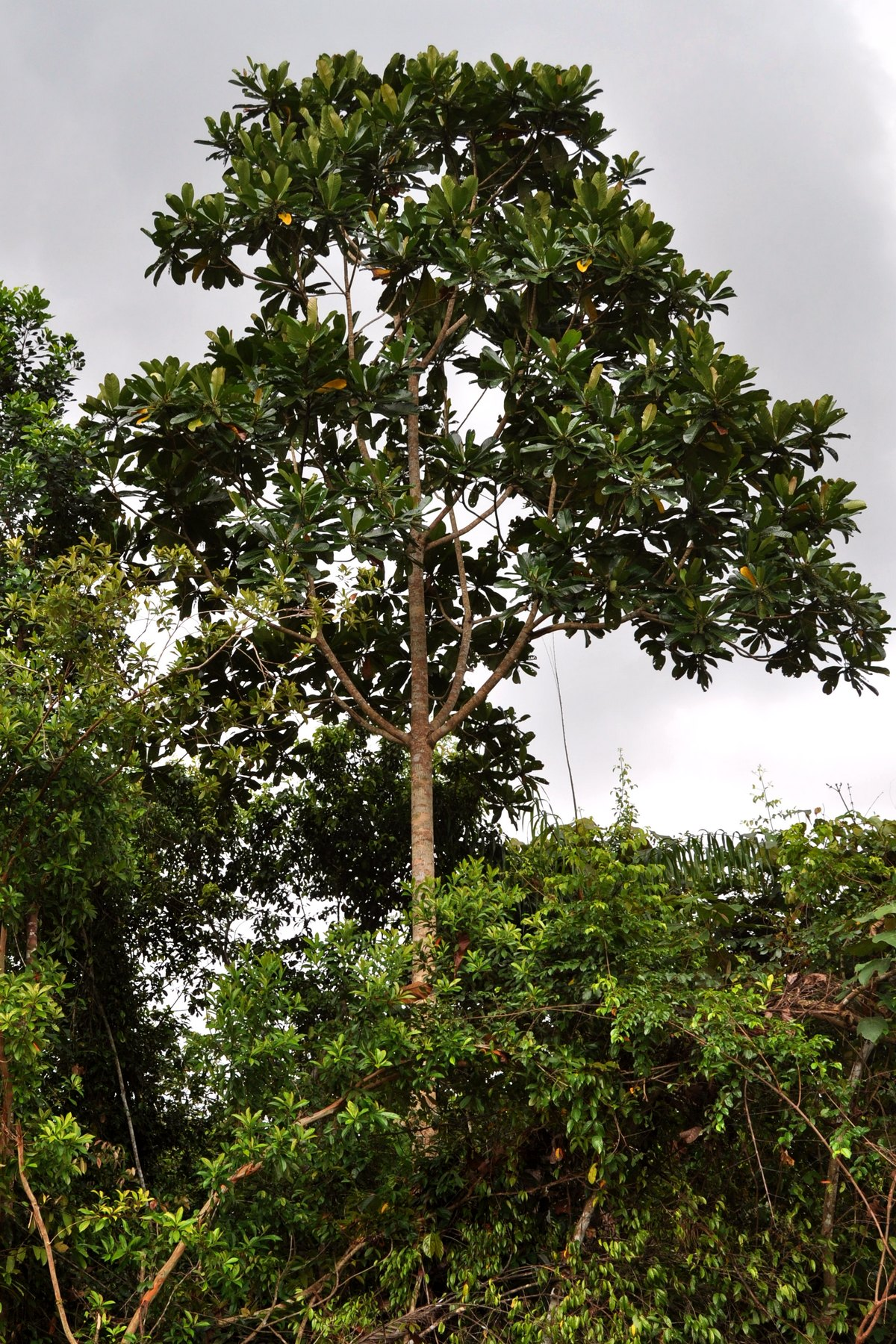
- In Sumatra

Conservation status
- Least Concern (IUCN 3.1)

Scientific classification
- Kingdom: Plantae
- Clade: Tracheophytes
- Clade: Angiosperms
- Clade: Eudicots
- Clade: Rosids
- Order: Sapindales
- Family: Anacardiaceae
- Genus: Campnosperma
- Species: C. auriculatum

Binomial name
- Campnosperma auriculatum (Blume) Hook.f.

= Campnosperma auriculatum =

Species of plant

Campnosperma auriculatum is a rainforest tree in the family Anacardiaceae native to the East Indies and Southeast Asia. The sapling tree has very large leaves up to 1.8 metres (6 feet) long by up to 37 centimetres (15 inches) wide with wavey margins. The leaves of mature trees are oblanceolate and about 75 centimetres (30 inches) long, forming a tight circle at the ends of the branches. The flowers are yellowish, in small panicles, forming reddish berries upon pollination.

== Pests ==
The rubber termite Coptotermes curvignathus is a minor pest of C. auriculatum.
