= Botanic Gardens MRT station =

Mass Rapid Transit station in Singapore

Botanic Gardens CC19 DT9 植物园 பூமலை Kebun Bunga
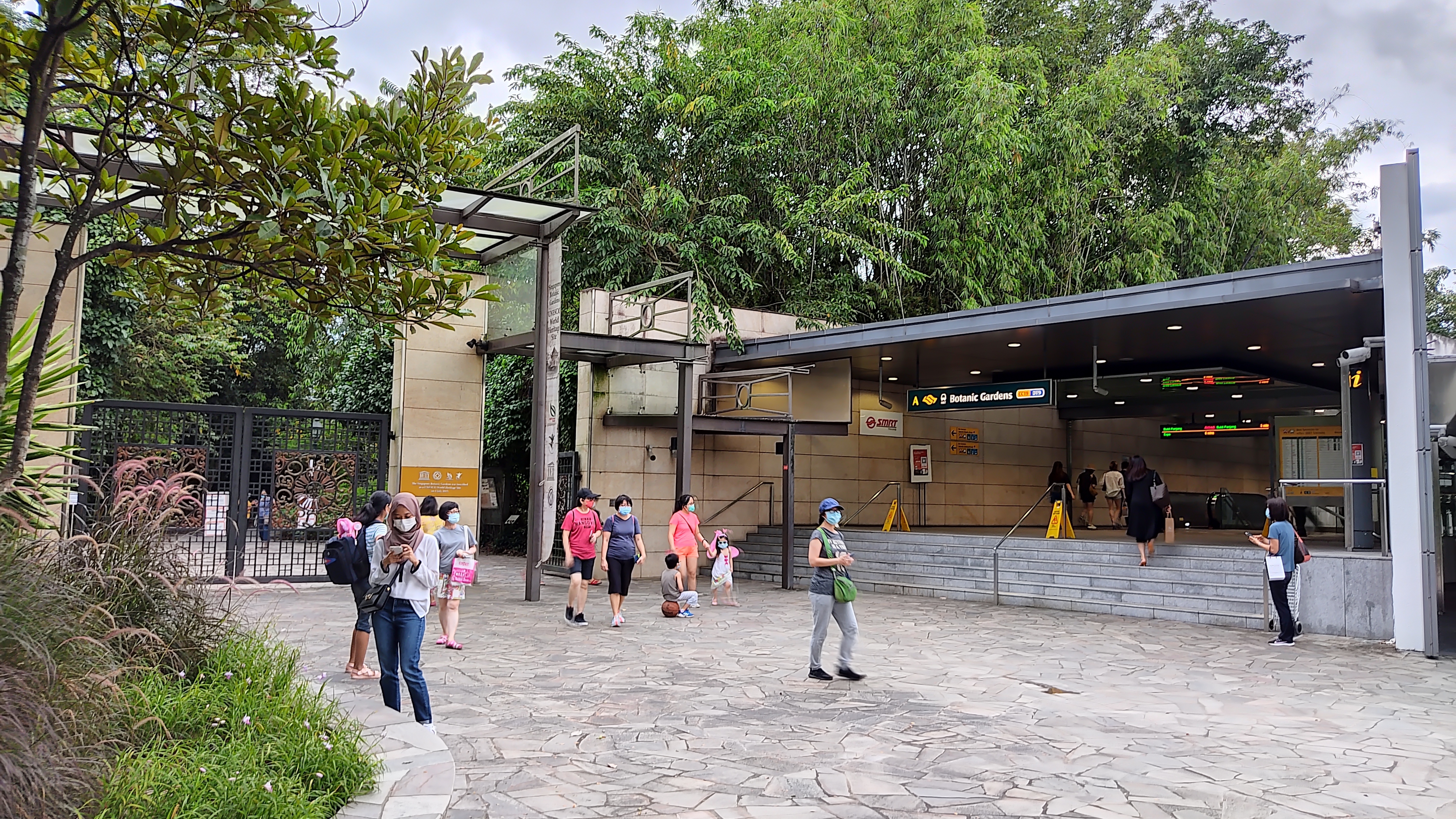
- Exit A of the station near the entrance to the Botanic Gardens.

General information
- Location: 100 Cluny Park Road, Singapore 257494 (CCL); 491 Bukit Timah Road, Singapore 259777 (DTL)
- Coordinates: 01°19′21″N 103°48′55″E
- System: Mass Rapid Transit (MRT) interchange
- Owner: Land Transport Authority
- Operator: SMRT Trains (Circle Line); SBS Transit (Downtown Line)
- Line: Circle Line Downtown Line
- Platforms: 4 (2 island platforms)
- Tracks: 4
- Connections: Bus, Taxi

Construction
- Structure type: Underground
- Platform levels: 2
- Accessible: Yes

Other information
- Station code: BTN

History
- Opened: 8 October 2011; 15 years ago (Circle Line); 27 December 2015; 10 years ago (Downtown Line)
- Former names: Adam, Old University, Cluny Road

Passengers
- June 2024: 6,096 per day

Services
Preceding station	Mass Rapid Transit	Following station
Caldecott Clockwise	Circle Line	Farrer Road Anticlockwise
Bukit Brown Clockwise	Circle Line Future service	Farrer Road Anticlockwise
Caldecott towards Dhoby Ghaut	Circle Line	Farrer Road towards Prince Edward Road
Tan Kah Kee towards Bukit Panjang	Downtown Line	Stevens towards Expo
Track layout
Location
- Location within Singapore Rail central area

Botanic Gardens MRT station is an underground Mass Rapid Transit (MRT) interchange station on the Circle Line (CCL) and the Downtown Line (DTL). Situated in Tanglin, Singapore, the station is located northwest of the Singapore Botanic Gardens at the junction of Bukit Timah Road and Cluny Park Road. Other nearby developments of the station include Crown Centre, Serene Centre, Cluny Court, Adam Road Food Centre and the National University of Singapore Lee Kuan Yew School of Public Policy.

First announced as Adam MRT station in 2003 as part of Stages 4 and 5 of the CCL, the station was renamed through a public poll in 2005. In 2007, it was announced that the station would interchange with the DTL. The CCL station opened on 8 October 2011, while the DTL station opened on 27 December 2015 as part of DTL Stage 2. Botanic Gardens station displays two public artworks as part of the MRT network's Art-in-Transit programme. The CCL station features Aquatic Fauna No. 1 by Lam Hoi Lit and Chua Chye Teck, and the DTL station features What is a Tree? by Shirley Soh.

== History ==
=== Circle Line ===
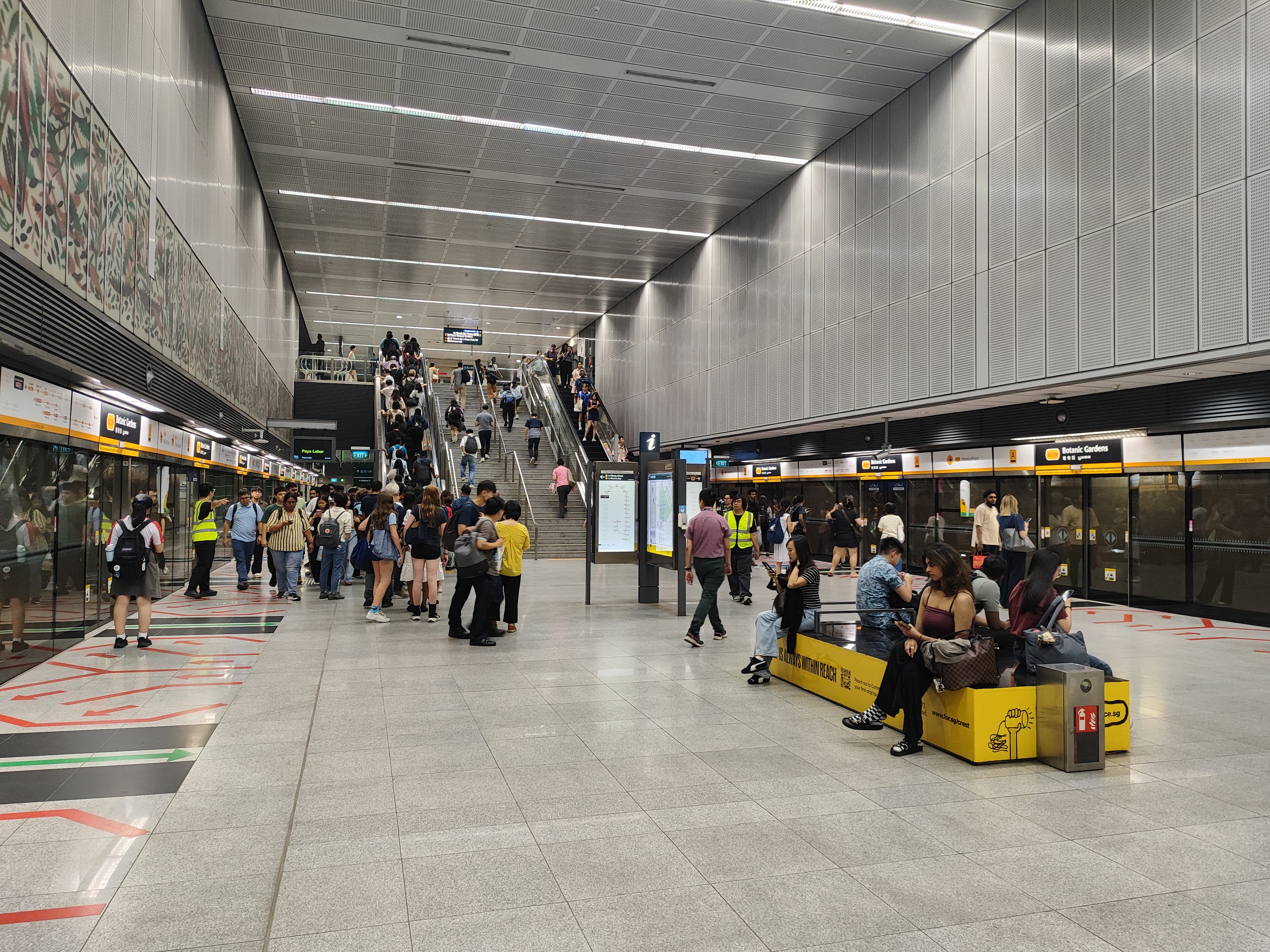
Botanic Gardens CCL platform

The station was first announced in December 2003 as Adam station as part of Stages 4 and 5 of the Circle Line (CCL). The contract for the construction of the Adam and Farrer stations (including 6.3 kilometres (3.9 miles) of twin bored tunnels) was awarded to Taisei Corporation for S$391.6 million (US$231.7 million) in July 2004.

The Land Transport Authority (LTA) launched a public poll in 2005 to replace the station's working name "Adam". While "Cluny" garnered more votes at 46.5% over "Old University", "Botanic Gardens" was chosen in November as the station name due to it being a popular suggestion from the respondents. As announced by transport minister Lui Tuck Yew during his visit to the Stages 4 and 5 CCL stations on 1 August 2011, the station began revenue service on 8 October of that year. An opening ceremony to commemorate the opening of Stages 4 and 5 of the CCL was held at this station, with deputy prime minister Tharman Shanmugaratnam in attendance.

=== Downtown Line ===
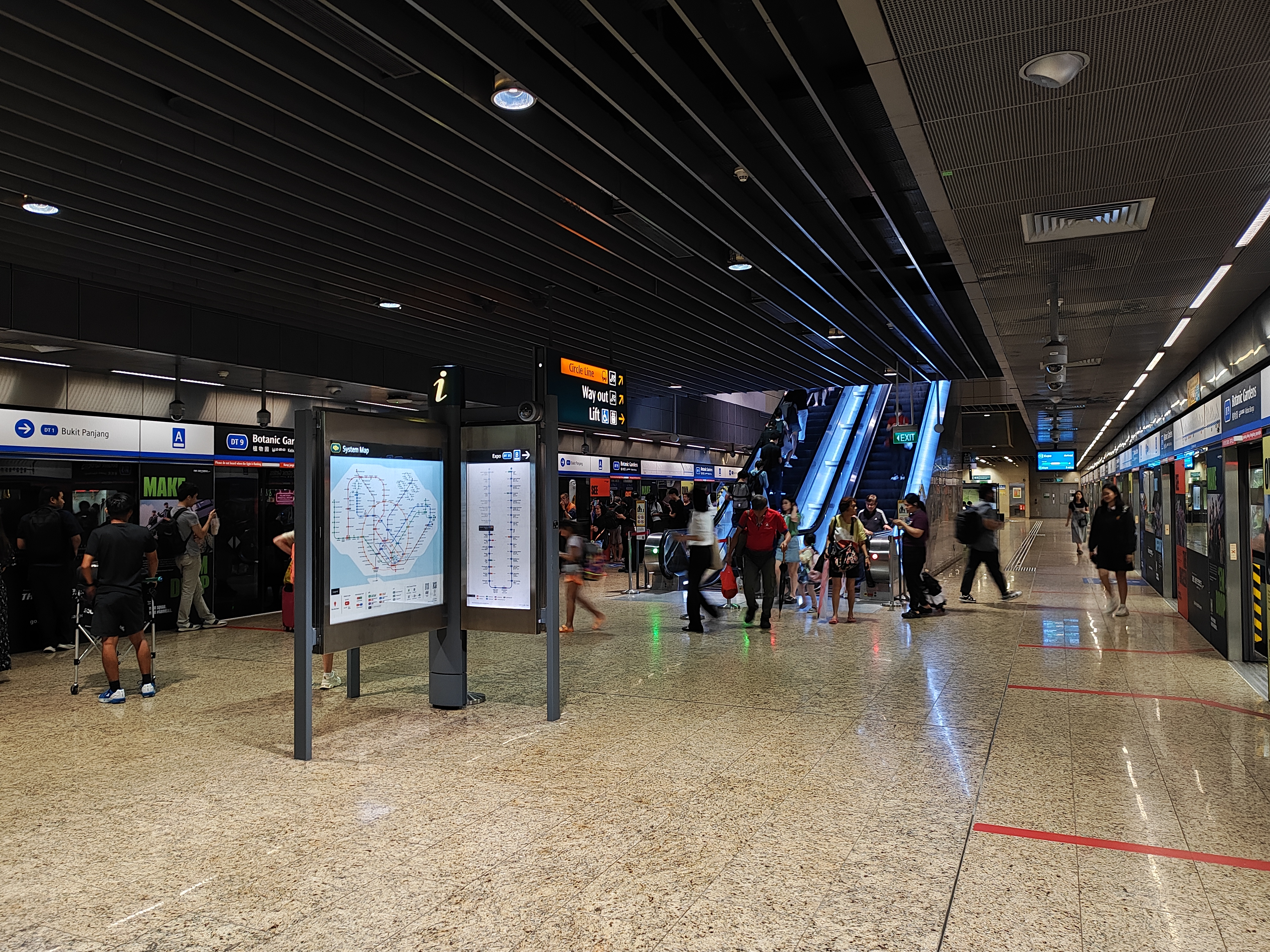
Botanic Gardens DTL platform

Botanic Gardens was first announced to be an interchange station with the Downtown Line (DTL) in 2007, and the LTA announced on 15 July 2008 that it would be part of DTL Stage 2 (DTL2). The contract for the design and construction of Botanic Gardens station and associated tunnels was awarded to Sembawang Engineers and Constructors Pte Ltd for S$378.2 million (US$260.02 million) in July 2009. The contract also includes the construction of the adjacent Stevens station. Construction of the station was scheduled to commence in the third quarter of 2009 and targeted to complete by 2015.

On 11 March 2012, a worker died when a concrete slab fell on him. Rescuers had to use a breaking tool to break the concrete slab and recover his body. The station opened on 27 December 2015 along with the other DTL2 stations. Prime Minister Lee Hsien Loong presided over the DTL2 opening ceremony held at this station.

On 4 May 2017, a faulty Platform Screen Door (PSD) on the Downtown Line (DTL) platform caused delays for trains heading to Chinatown station as the staff had to manually operate the doors. At 9:37 am, the Chinatown-bound platform was temporarily closed to allow DTL train services to proceed without further delays. The fault was resolved by 12:54 pm, and Chinatown-bound services resumed at Botanic Gardens station. An investigation determined that groundwater seepage had damaged the PSD's electrical components, causing the fault. The seepage issue was resolved by grouting with a polyurethane chemical to fill the void and prevent further leaks.

== Details ==
Botanic Gardens station is an interchange station on the CCL and the DTL. On the CCL, the station is between the Caldecott and Farrer Road stations, while the station is between the Tan Kah Kee and Stevens stations on the DTL. The station code is CC19/DT9. The station is located near the Singapore Botanic Gardens along Bukit Timah Road; its two entrances serve Adam Road Food Centre, Cluny Court, the French Embassy, the National University of Singapore (NUS) Faculty of Law, Crown Centre, Serene Centre and Singapore Bible College. Botanic Gardens is one of two stations on the MRT network to have a distinct Malay name.

The station is wheelchair-accessible. A tactile system, consisting of tiles with rounded or elongated raised studs, guides visually impaired commuters through the station, with dedicated tactile routes that connect the station entrances to the platforms. Wider fare gates allow easier access for wheelchair users into the station. Botanic Gardens CCL station is one of eleven stations along the CCL designated as Civil Defence shelters, which are to be activated in times of national emergency. Apart from reinforced construction, the stations are designed and equipped with facilities to ensure the shelter environment is tolerable for all during shelter occupation. These facilities include protective blast doors, decontamination facilities, ventilation systems, power and water supply systems and a dry toilet system.

The CCL station has a water feature at one end of the platform, with cascading water illuminated by red, green and blue lights. The water is collected in a trough which prevents water from getting into the station. This feature was a later inclusion of the station design intended as a landmark for welcoming commuters to the gardens. The skylight at the station incorporates a floral design. The interior of the DTL station incorporates touches of nature with green palettes that reflect the design concept of flora and fauna.

== Public artwork ==
The station displays two artworks that were commissioned as part of the MRT network's Art-in-Transit programme, a showcase of public artworks on the MRT network.

=== Aquatic Fauna No. 1 ===
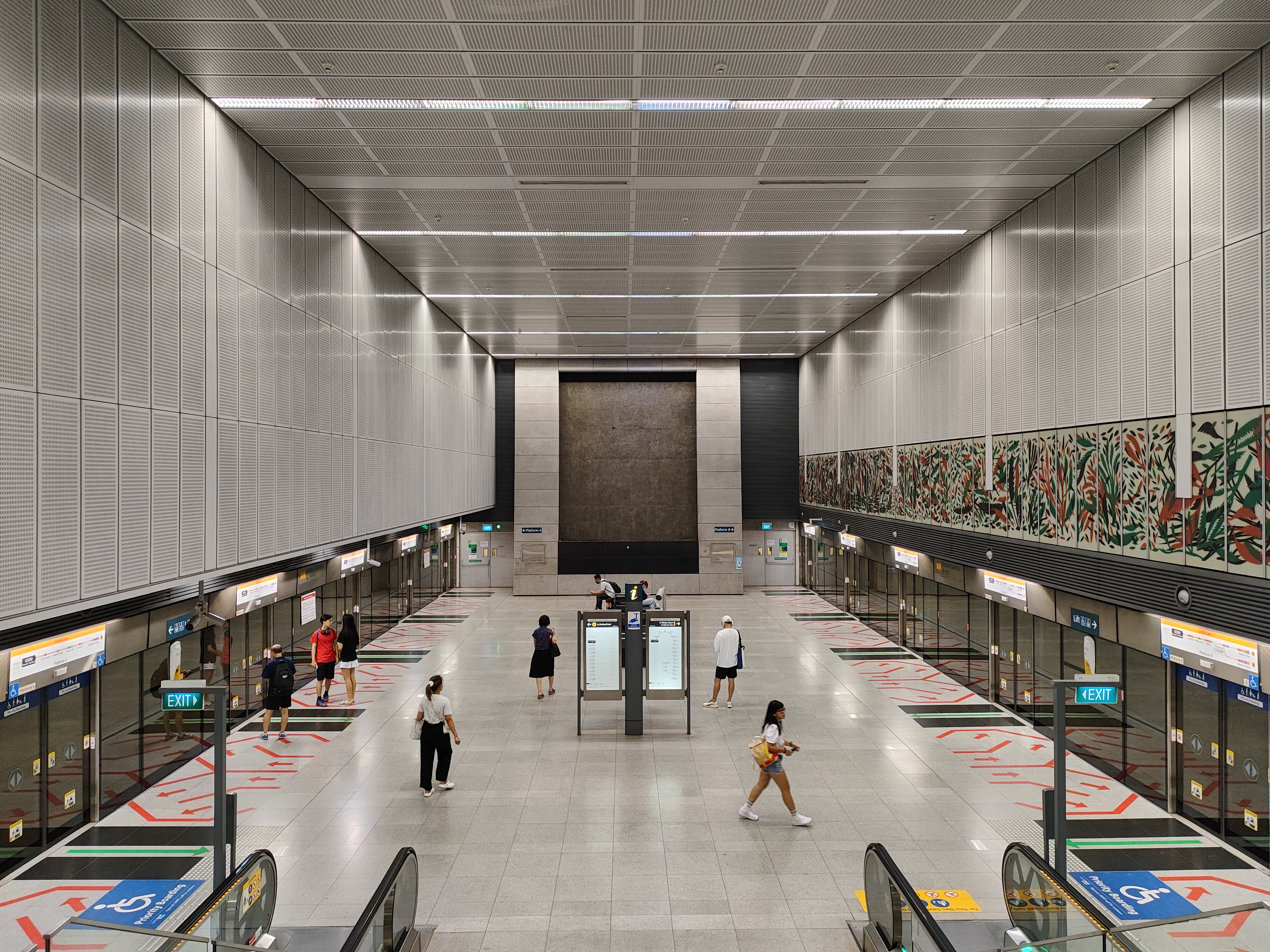
Aquatic Fauna No. 1 is displayed along one side of the CCL platform, complementing the water feature at the end of the platform.

Aquatic Fauna No. 1, by Lam Hoi Lit and Chua Chye Teck, is a large mural of paper cuttings depicting varieties of animals and plants along a section of the CCL platform wall. The work, referencing the station's proximity to Botanic Gardens, was intended to introduce nature to the station and complement the station's water feature as part of an overarching "underwater garden" theme. In light of Singapore's rapid urbanisation, the artists also wanted the work to bring attention to preservationist and conservation efforts.

Aware of the Botanic Gardens' large role in Singapore's nature through its horticultural work and research, the artists, who had collaborated before, selected the Botanic Gardens station when they were commissioned to create an artwork for the CCL. When the pair had crafted Lam's previous work, Hybrid Fishes, they had obtained insights about aquatic life and plants, which inspired the Botanic Gardens station artwork's "underwater garden" theme. Using a technique similar to traditional Chinese paper-cutting, the artist produced various images in a short time and pieced together the paper cuts. The artists devised three large patterns, one of which the Art Review Panel selected as the motif for the final mural.

Chua photographed the chosen pattern, which was scanned and converted to a digital vector drawing. While digitalising their work, Lam and Chua smoothened the jagged edges of the paper cuts that ended up pixelated in the scans. In fusing the various elements, the artists also avoided repetitive-looking details in the final artwork. The work was then printed on a vinyl sticker which was cut into several pieces before being put up over the platform. Chua considered the project as a "celebration" of art form and nature, while Lam hoped commuters would be more environmentally aware to the natural environment of which they were part.

=== What is a Tree? ===
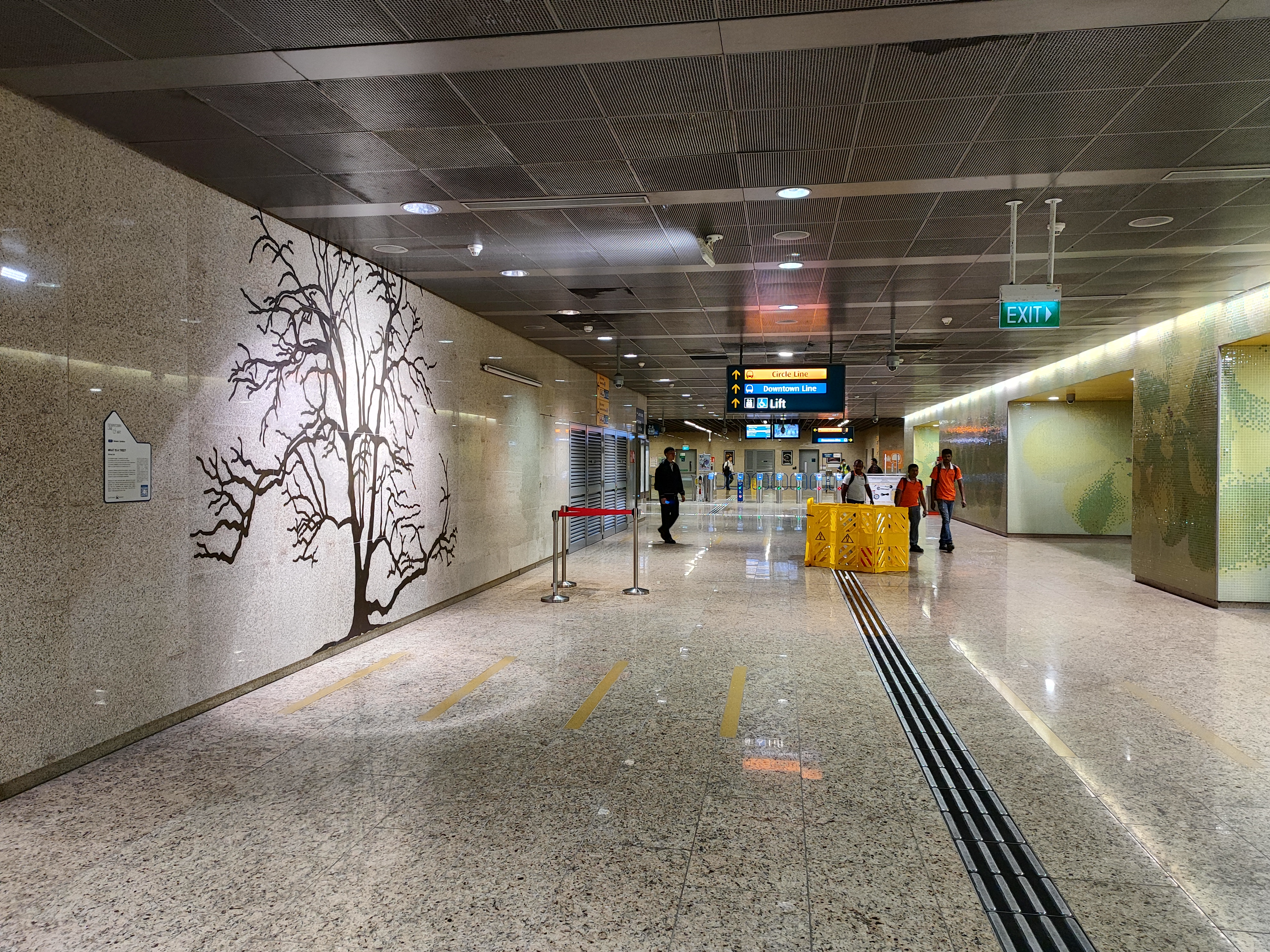
The metal engraving along the DTL concourse

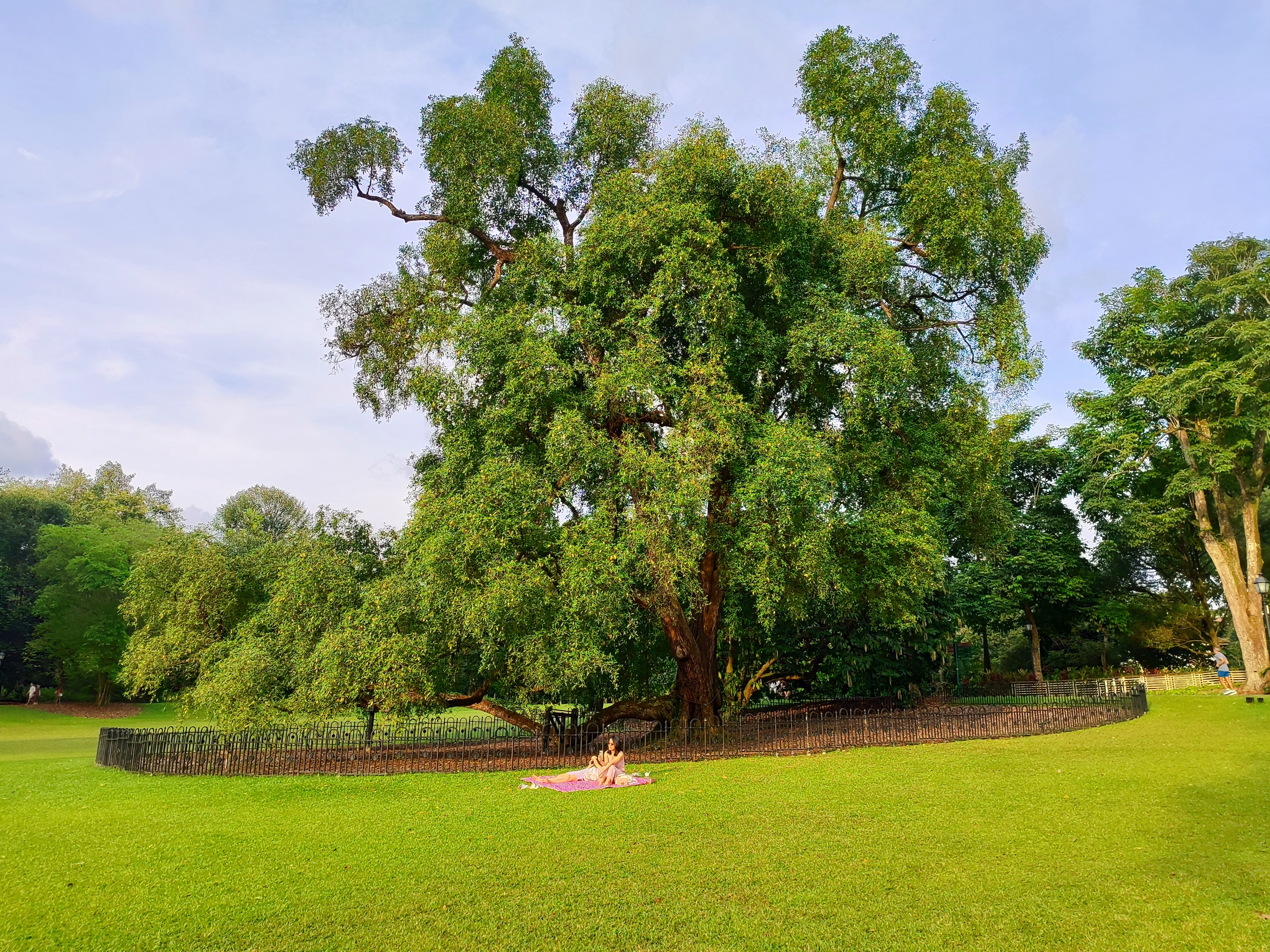
The Tembusu Tree in the Singapore Botanic Gardens inspired the artwork

What is a Tree? by Shirley Soh depicts the iconic Tembusu tree on the front lawn of Botanic Gardens through three art mediums – a photograph, a metal engraving and a sandblasted silhouette. Her first permanent public artwork, the piece is also accompanied by a series of quotes by poets, artists and nature lovers that are etched into the station's floor. Soh selected the Tembusu tree to represent her artwork on trees for Botanic Gardens station, as it was the most iconic feature of Singapore after which many places and buildings were named. The artist was also inspired by the book The Secret Life of Trees by Colin Tudge, which encouraged people to look inside trees instead of just their exteriors, given the importance of trees.

Soh noted how different the tree appears from other perspectives, which inspired her to create three different art pieces. She also intended to draw the attention of commuters, making them feel familiarity with the artwork and having them consider whether it was the same as the Tembusu tree. The barren form which exposed the Tembusu's trunking system was initially planned to be crafted out of rusted Corten steel to resemble the original colour of the tree. Due to safety concerns, the station contractor suggested using copper, which was burnt and brushed to achieve the desired colour. The sandblasted silhouette depicts the ecosystem that the tree supports, including the insects in the trunk and the birds on the branches. The photograph displayed at the DTL platform is accompanied by seeds and leaves collected at the Tembusu, with the flowers extended in surrealist style. The photograph references the colonial-era botanical illustrations while illustrating the "whole life of a tree".

As many Singaporeans visit the Botanic Gardens, Soh sought public involvement by working with National Parks Board to gather thoughts about trees. The quotes that became part of the artwork also include local literature on trees, from Arthur Yap's poem Bayan Tree to Kuo Pao Kun's The Silly Young Girl and the Funny Old Tree. For the artwork, Dr Geh Mih – the Nature Society President – and the NUS students of Tembusu College provided their reflections on trees. A volunteer of the Gardens – Keith Hiller, with whom Soh formed a friendship during her visits to the Gardens – contributed two poems on the distinct nature of a tree. Soh took the idea to incorporate literature from her visits to train stations in India, where poetry was written on the walls of stations for waiting commuters to read.
