= Serene Centre =

Mixed-use development in Bukit Timah, Singapore

Serene Centre is a mixed-use development at the corner of Bukit Timah Road and Farrer Road in Bukit Timah, Singapore. Opened in 1986, its first two floors served as a neighbourhood shopping centre while the upper two floors housed apartments. In 2024, the building was sold to the Teo family of Apricot Capital, who appointed The Assembly Place as co-manager with plans to "revamp" the complex.

== History ==
The four-story complex opened at the junction of Bukit Timah Road and Farrer Road in 1986. The $12 million structure was built by investment company Lok Joo Pte Ltd. The first two floors served as a shopping centre which included a supermarket, while the upper two floors housed 10 two and three-room apartments, reportedly each fully air-conditioned and with a unique layout. There was also a carpark in the basement and a swimming pool and a landscaped garden on the roof. At its opening, the mall's tenants included the first outlet of Comics Mart, a comic book store, as well as a McDonald's outlet on the first floor.

In August 1987, the Hwa Hong group announced that it would soon be acquiring the complex for $14 million worth of the company's shares. The building had a rental income of $514,000 for the year of 1986, which would have given the group a 3.7% gross return. It was then nearly fully occupied, save for three apartments and one shop unit. However, it was announced in November that the deal had fallen through as it had not been an approval from the Controller of Residential Property by the set deadline of 5 November and Lok Joo did not agree to an extension of the deadline. According to Lisa Lee of The Business Times, Lok Joo no longer felt that the terms of the deal were desirable due to the Black Monday stock market crash. The complex was again put up for sale in November 1989. It was then reportedly one of the "rare en bloc retail-cum residential complexes in Singapore."

The mall largely drew customers from nearby schools and embassies in addition to the surrounding neighbourhood and was patronised by families, youths and "a sizeable expatriate community." It served both the Bukit Timah and the Tanglin areas, and was known for its McDonald's outlet and its ice cream parlours and comics and game stores. In 2009, Comics Mart's outlets in Raffles City Singapore and Cathay Cineleisure Orchard shut down, leaving the Serene Centre outlet as the company's last. By then, it had become one of the oldest comic shops in the country. By May 2010, around 90% of its tenants owned their businesses. Prominent tenants then included Tierney's Gourmet, a supermarket on the second floor, alongside the McDonald's and the Comics Mart. It was expected then that the mall would see a 30% increase in foot traffic following the opening of the Botanic Gardens MRT station a short distance away from Serene Centre in 2011. However, Comics Mart "abruptly shut its doors" in April, while the Tierney's Gourmet supermarket, which had "become an institution and a go-to place for all things gourmet", shut down in July due to rising rent, though its owner Jee Tierney, wife of founder Peter Tierney, continued to operate the Tierney's Cafe at the complex.

In November, the complex was put up for sale through expression of interest by property firm Colliers International. It was launched for sale via tender in September 2022 at a reserve price of $120 million. However, it closed without a successful bid. In February 2024, the complex was sold to the Teo family of Apricot Capital for $105 million. The Assembly Place, a co-living space operator, was appointed the asset manager. It was announced that the complex would undergo months-long renovation works. The first two floors were to be "revitalised" while the upper floors would be converted into a co-living space with 86 apartments. The works began in April and were expected to finish by early 2025.
