= Caldecott MRT station =

Mass Rapid Transit station in Singapore

Caldecott CC17 TE9 加利谷 கால்டிகாட்
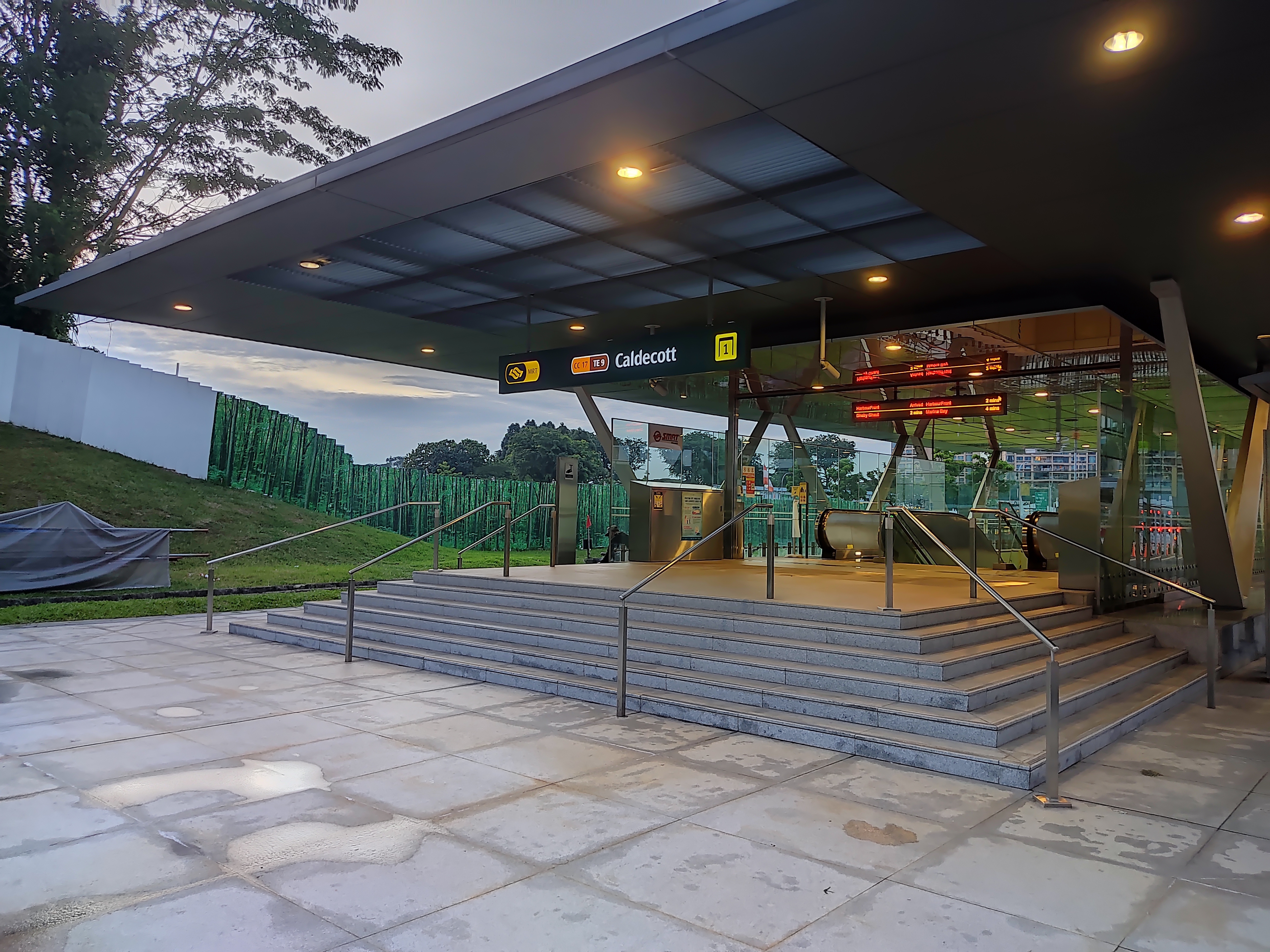
- Exit 1 of Caldecott MRT station.

General information
- Location: 38 Toa Payoh Rise, Singapore 298113 (CCL); 1 Toa Payoh Link, Singapore 297608 (TEL)
- Coordinates: 01°20′16″N 103°50′22″E
- System: Mass Rapid Transit (MRT) interchange
- Owner: Land Transport Authority
- Operator: SMRT Trains
- Line: Circle Line Thomson–East Coast Line
- Platforms: 4 (2 island platforms)
- Tracks: 4
- Connections: Bus, Taxi

Construction
- Structure type: Underground
- Depth: 35 metres (115 ft)
- Platform levels: 2
- Cycle facilities: Yes
- Accessible: Yes

Other information
- Station code: CDT

History
- Opened: 8 October 2011; 15 years ago (Circle Line); 28 August 2021; 5 years ago (Thomson–East Coast Line)
- Former names: Thomson

Passengers
- June 2024: 5,765 per day

Services
Preceding station	Mass Rapid Transit	Following station
Marymount Clockwise	Circle Line	Botanic Gardens Anticlockwise
Marymount Clockwise	Circle Line Future service	Bukit Brown Anticlockwise
Marymount towards Dhoby Ghaut	Circle Line	Botanic Gardens towards Prince Edward Road
Upper Thomson towards Woodlands North	Thomson–East Coast Line	Stevens towards Bayshore
Upper Thomson towards Woodlands North	Thomson–East Coast Line Future service	Mount Pleasant towards Sungei Bedok
Track layout
Location
- Location within Singapore Rail central area

Caldecott MRT station is an underground Mass Rapid Transit (MRT) interchange station on the Circle (CCL) and Thomson–East Coast (TEL) lines, located in the Toa Payoh planning area of Singapore. It is situated underneath Toa Payoh Link near the junction of Toa Payoh Rise, located near the Singapore Association of the Visually Handicapped (SAVH), the Caldecott Broadcast Centre and Mount Alvernia Hospital. The station is operated by SMRT Trains.

Initially planned to be a shell station tentatively named Thomson, in 2008, the station was announced to be opened along with the Stages 4 and 5 of the CCL stations. The CCL station opened in 2011. In 2012, Caldecott was announced to be an interchange with the TEL. Although expected to be completed in 2020, the TEL extension to the station was delayed to 2021 due to the COVID-19 pandemic in Singapore. The TEL station opened on 28 August 2021 along with the TEL Stage 2 (TEL2) stations.

The CCL station, which is a Civil Defence (CD) shelter, features The Cartography Of Memories by Hazel Lim. Another artwork, :)(: by Claire Lim, is displayed at the TEL station.

== History ==
=== Circle Line ===
When the Circle Line (CCL) was initially planned, this station, tentatively named "Thomson", was planned to be a shell station. The station was to be opened only when the surroundings were more developed. The contract for the construction of rapid transit system facilities for Thomson station was awarded to Taisei Corporation at a sum of S$391.59 million (US$231.68 million). (Note: The contract includes the construction and completion of the Adam and Farrer Stations (Botanic Gardens and Farrer Road stations, respectively), including 6.3-kilometre (3.9-mile) of twin bored tunnels, and rapid transit system facilities for Bukit Brown station.)

The station was later announced to be opened with the Stage 4 CCL stations in 2008 and was renamed to "Caldecott" through a public poll. The station opened on 8 October 2011.

=== Thomson–East Coast Line ===
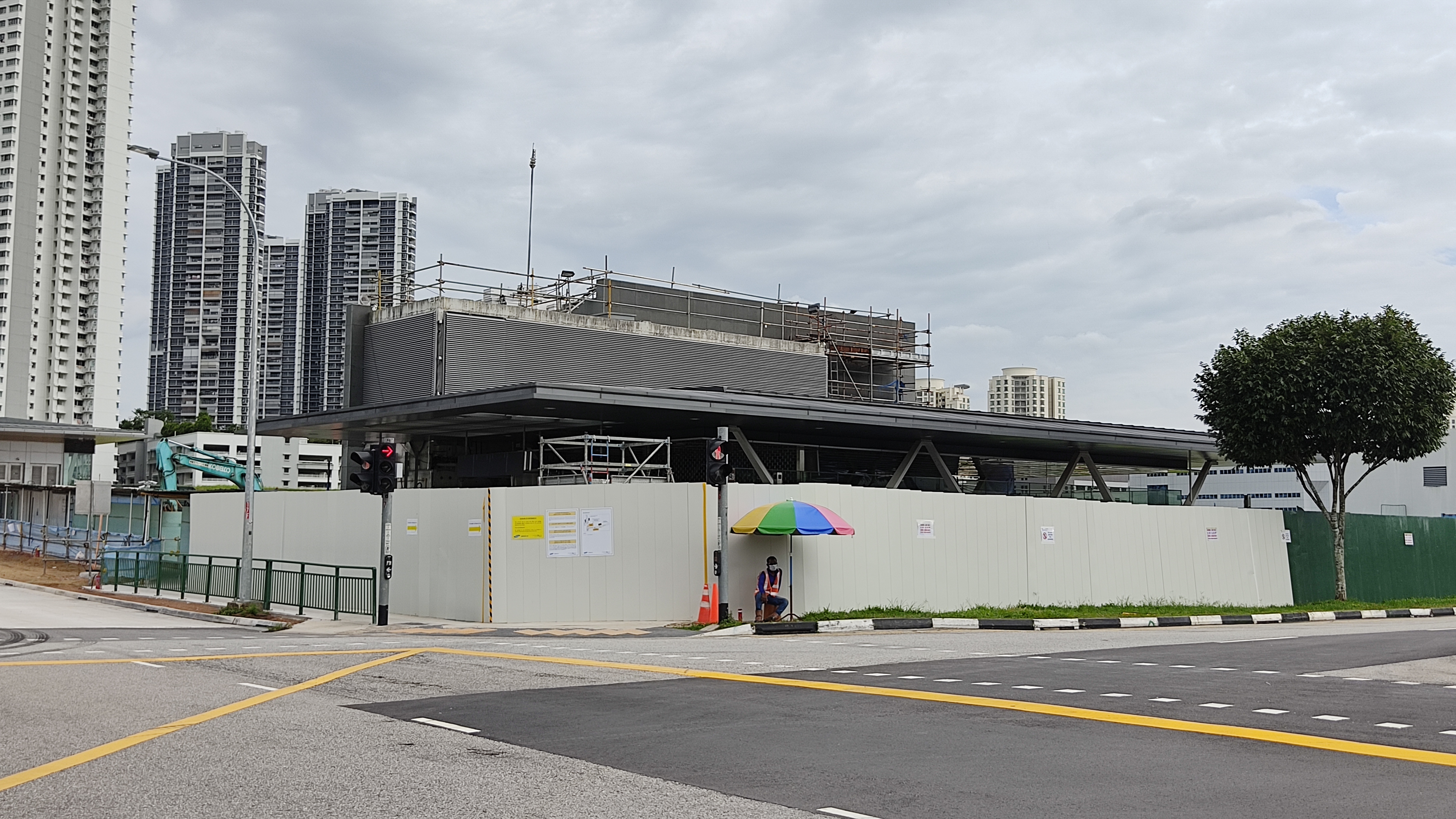
The former entrance of the station closed for the construction

Caldecott station was first announced to interchange with the 22-station Thomson Line (TSL) on 29 August 2012. Contract T213 for the design and construction of the TSL platform and associated tunnels was awarded to Samsung C&T Corporation at a sum of S$285 million (US$227.76 million) in July 2013. Construction started in 2014, with completion initially targeted to be completed in 2020.

On 15 August 2014, the Land Transport Authority (LTA) announced that TSL would merge with the ERL to form the TEL. Caldecott station, being part of the proposed line, would be constructed as part of TEL2, which consists of six stations between Springleaf and Caldecott. The station was the terminus of the TEL before the line extended to Gardens by the Bay station. Originally slated to be completed by 2021, however due to the COVID-19 pandemic, the restrictions imposed on construction works led to delays in the TEL line completion, and the date was pushed to 2022.

To facilitate the construction of the interchange station, Exit A of the station was permanently closed from 15 November 2020. Due to the mixed ground conditions of soil and rock and the presence of groundwater, the TEL tunnels at Caldecott station were mined instead of the cut-and-cover method. This construction method also minimised disruption to a service road connecting to St. Joseph's Institution International school. About 160,000 cubic metres (210,000 cu yd) of rock was removed via electronic rock blasting.

On 14 December 2020, it was announced that the opening of TEL 2 was delayed to the third quarter of 2021 so the rail system software for the line could be reviewed. As announced during a visit by Transport Minister S. Iswaran at Caldecott station on 30 June 2021, the station began operations on 28 August 2021. Prior to opening of phase 3 of TEL, trains turnaround by using the cripple siding on the south end of the station.

== Station details ==
=== Location and services ===
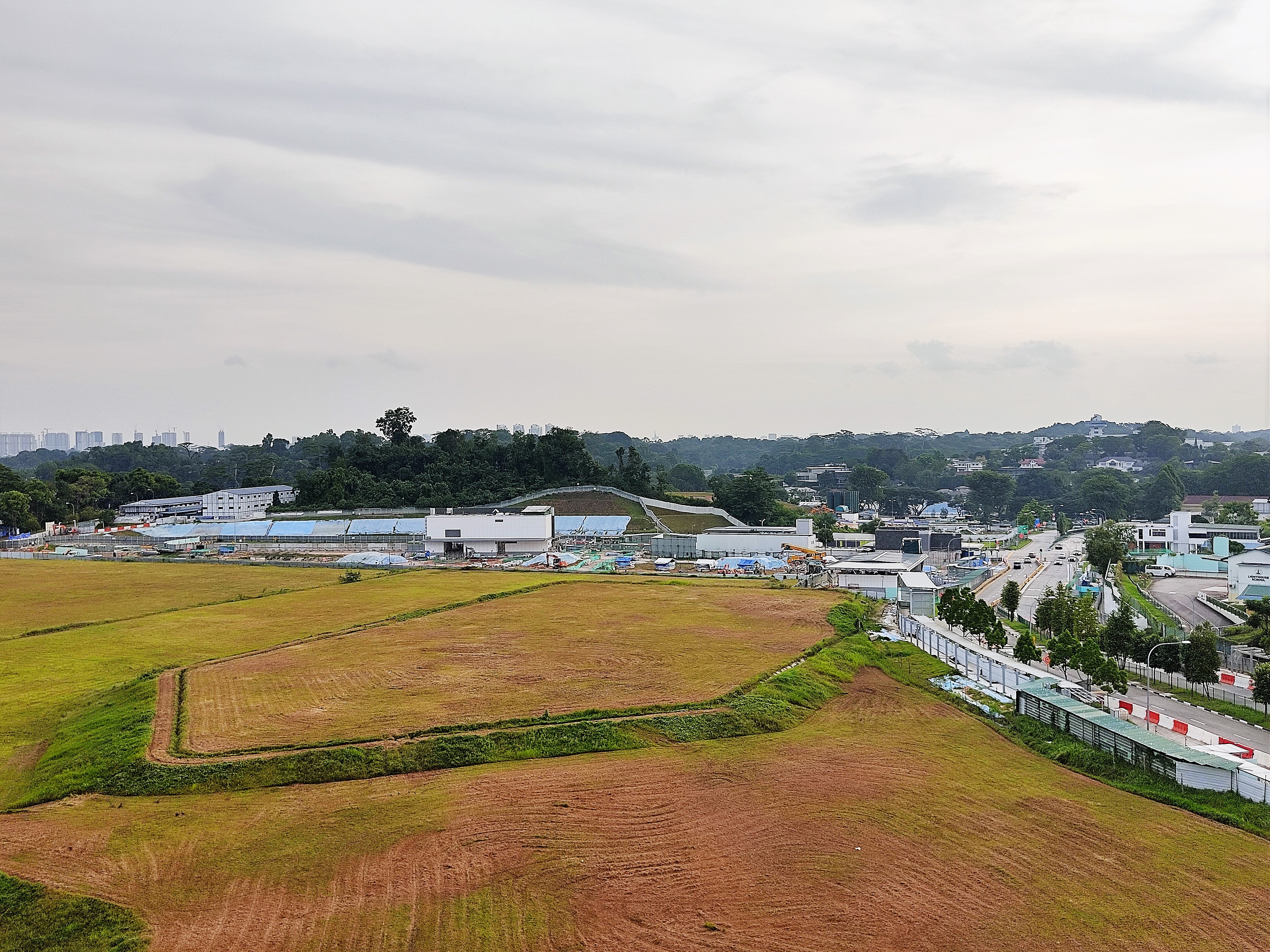
The site of Caldecott station, with the TEL station nearing completion

Caldecott station is an interchange station on the CCL and TEL. The official station code is CC17/TE9. On the CCL, it is between the Marymount and Botanic Gardens stations. The station operates between 5:28 am and 12:30 am. Train frequencies on the CCL range from 3.5 to 7 minutes depending on peak hours. On the TEL, the station is between the Upper Thomson and Stevens stations. Train frequencies on the TEL range from 3 to 6 minutes.

Located underneath Toa Payoh Link, the station is near schools such as the Marymount Convent School, Lighthouse School and the Singapore School for the Visually Handicapped. It is also close to community and health-related centres such as the Assisi Hospice, Mount Alvernia Hospital, Orange Valley Nursing Home and the Singapore Association of the Visually Handicapped (SAVH).

=== Station design ===
Caldecott CCL station is one of eleven stations along the Circle Line designated as CD shelters, which will be activated in times of national emergency. Apart from reinforced construction, the stations are designed and equipped with facilities to ensure the shelter environment is tolerable for all during shelter occupation. These facilities include protective blast doors, decontamination facilities, ventilation systems, power and water supply systems and a dry toilet system.

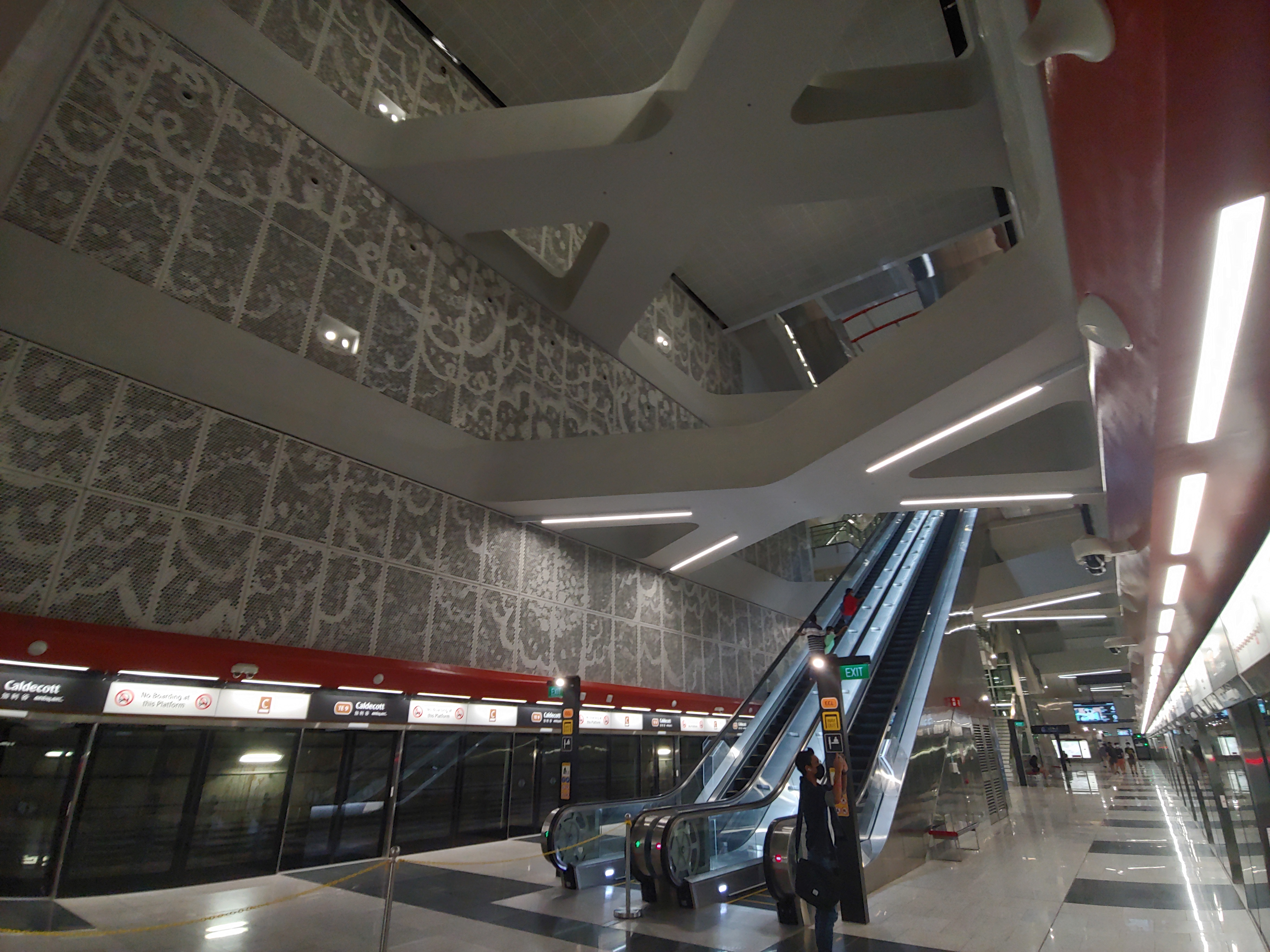
TEL platforms

The TEL station has a unique X architectural design. The platforms are the deepest among the TEL2 stations at 35 metres (115 ft) deep, which are illuminated by natural light. Located near the SAVH, the station has various several features that caters to visually impaired. This included greater colour contrasts at the station platforms and illuminated staircase handrails to enhance visibility. Wheelchair-friendly facilities for the station include backrests and handrails. Near the TEL station was a cripple siding.

== Station artwork ==
=== CCL artwork ===
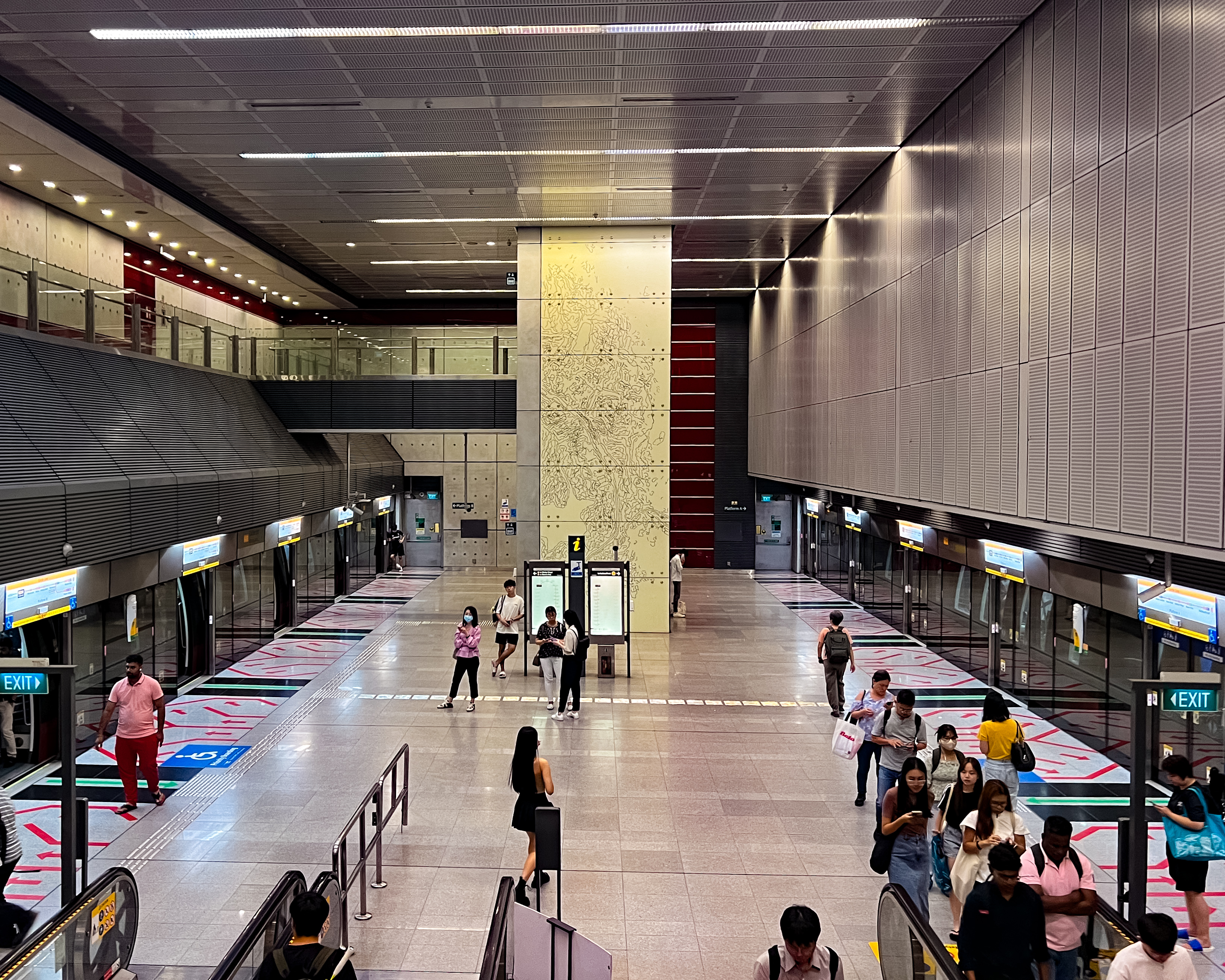
CCL platform level with the artwork on the lift shaft

The station features two artworks as part of the MRT network's Art-in-Transit (AiT) Programme, a public art showcase which integrates artworks into the MRT network. The Cartography Of Memories by Hazel Lim is displayed on the lift shaft at the CCL platforms. The artwork depicts a cartographic map of the Thomson area, where the station is located, using written recollections from some 100 local residents and friends recalling their memorable experiences in Singapore.

Originally, Lim proposed a collage of pictures depicting the station's surroundings, seen through frames such as grilles on a bridge or through a window. However, the Art Review Panel, in charge of the AiT programme, was not impressed with this idea, due to its lack of effectiveness on the vertical lift shaft. Realising the impact of the station's and line's construction on the surrounding landscape, the artist decided to capture people's responses towards this, using text as an artistic medium. At the same time, the artist was researching faraway places on Google Maps for another artwork. Looking at the satellite view of Thomson, the artist saw the possibility of framing the area depicting the landmarks around the station. These two ideas were combined into the idea of mapping Thomson using written memories.

After collecting the various responses from friends, relatives and LTA staff, Lim selected 40 unique recollections for the work. As Lim fit the sentences of the recollections in the work, she put the more interesting recollections in the lower panels where they could be viewed up close by commuters. For more depth in the artwork, some of the words overlap to represent the developed areas, resulting in a map of "interweaving memories". The artist later explained that the fragmentation of the sentences reflects memories being fragmented as people move on, recalling only "bits and pieces" of such memories.

Lim took up the suggestion from an LTA architect to print the 9.1-metre (30 ft) by 2.9-metre (9.5 ft) artwork without a background, so that the work could be seen in detail from the other side. When it was put up, however, the work was not clearly visible, so a manila background was used. The artist has considered other colours like grey or white, but find grey to be "too cold" and white to be "too stark". Manila, according to the artist, resembles the colours used on envelopes.

This artwork is intended to be a reflection of Lim's response to life in the rapidly changing landscape of Singapore. Through this work, the artist addressed the notions of displacement and the creation of histories, maps and landscapes especially those linked to Singapore. Observing the changes in Singapore, the artist portrays the memories that "slipped through" the gaps of the recent past. In addition, through the concept of framing, the station surroundings could be seen through a less commonly used angle, also used in the artist's works.

=== TEL artwork ===
Claire Lim's artwork :)(:, a series of dot patterns that form smiley faces, is shown on the TEL platforms. The artwork was inspired by the station's location near the SAVH. The smiley dot patterns, based on Braille, are intended as a "cheery greeting" for commuters.

== Notes and references ==
=== Bibliography ===
- Zhuang, Justin (2013). Art in transit : Circle Line MRT – Singapore. Singapore: Land Transport Authority. ISBN 978-981-07-4982-8. OCLC 854958677.
- Cheong, Colin (2012). The Circle Line, Linking All Lines. ISBN 978-981-4342-02-5.
