= Thomson Road, Singapore =

Thomson Road
- Road
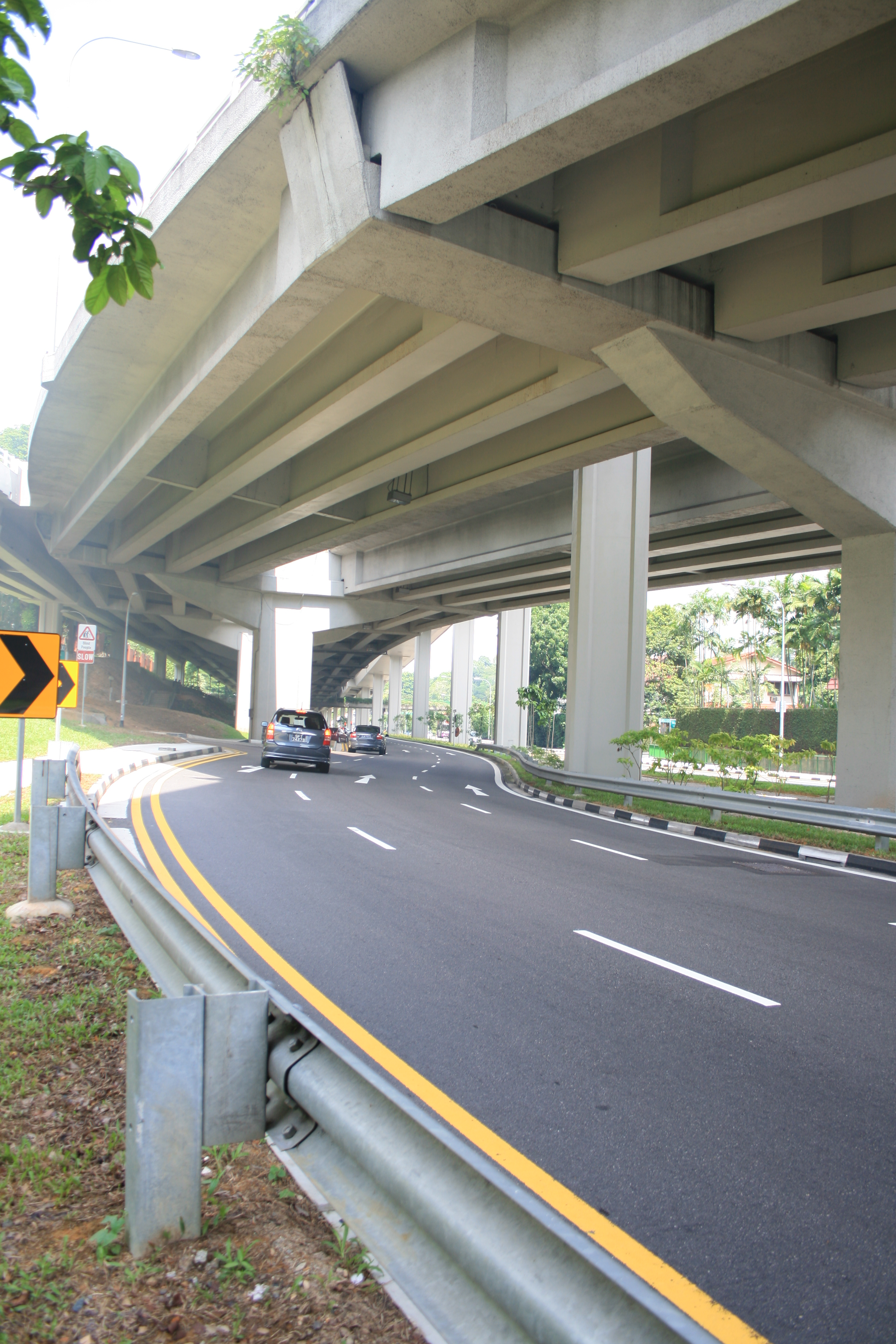

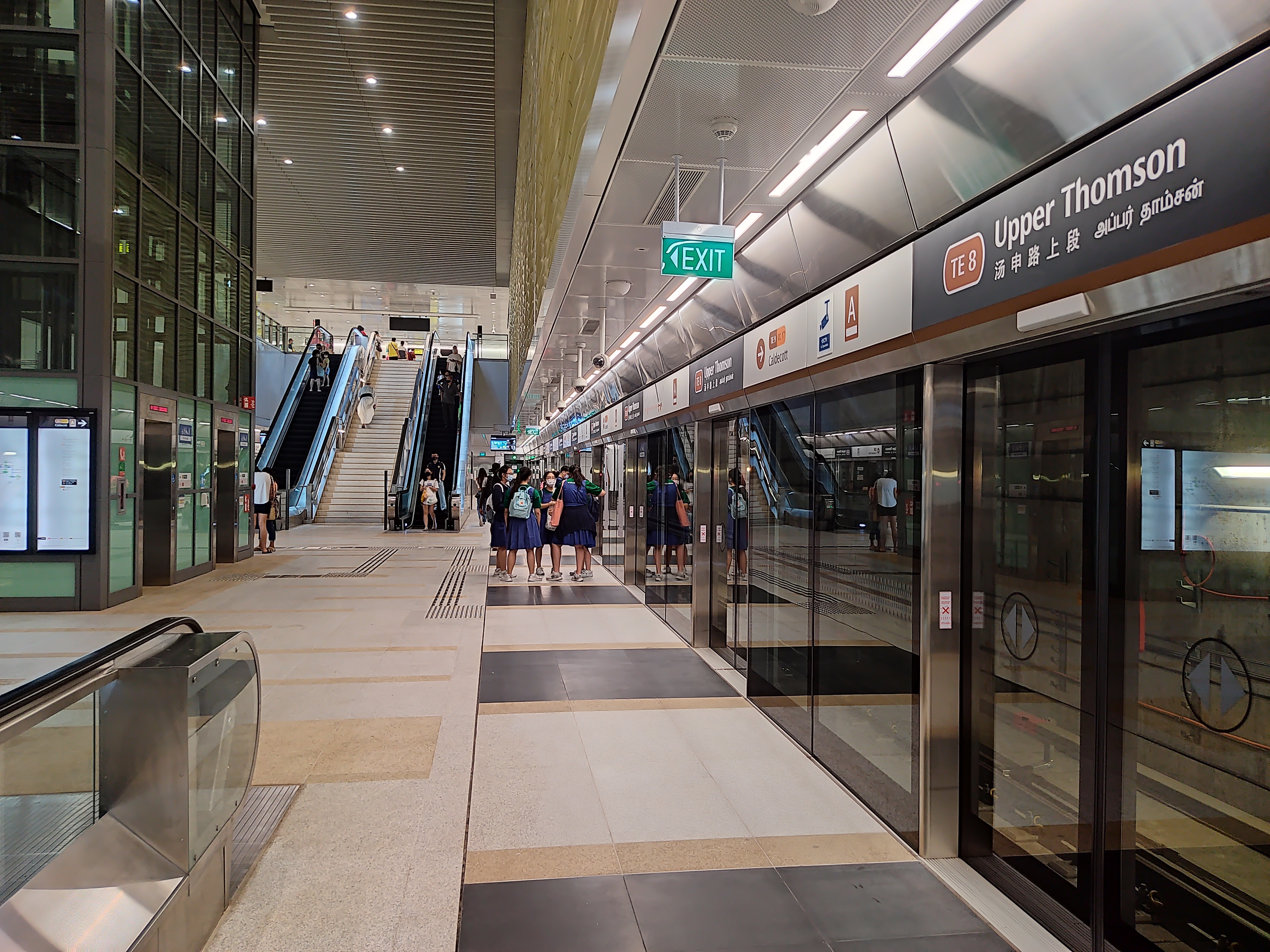
- Thomson Road underneath the Lornie Viaduct (top) Upper Thomson MRT station (bottom)
- Location in Singapore
- Coordinates: 1.3289°N 103.8405°E
- Country: Singapore
- Planning Area: Central Area, Ang Mo Kio, Yishun
- Boundaries: Keng Lee Road, Kampong Java Road, Cavenagh Road, Marymount Road, Sembawang Road

Thomson Road is a major trunk road linking Singapore's central business district with the northern suburban areas of the country. The road is one of the longest in Singapore, starting from Novena in the south towards MacRitchie Reservoir, before continuing northwards as Upper Thomson Road towards Yishun and Sembawang.

== Etymology ==
The road was named after John Turnbull Thomson, who was the Government Surveyor and Chief Engineer of the Straits Settlements from 1841 to 1853.

== History ==
Thomson Road was constructed to connect the city centre to the airport and naval base at Seletar. The road was originally known as Thomson Road, after which the name was Seletar Road. This resulted in confusion as the naval and air bases, were then both known as Seletar.

In response to this, parts of the road were renamed in 1939. It was determined that the road would be called Thomson Road until the Yio Chu Kang junction, whereupon it was to become Upper Thomson Road until the Mandai Road junction. From the Mandai Road junction until the northern coast, it was named as Sembawang Road. The name Seletar Road was dropped.

In 1959, the Singapore Rural Board (RB) renamed the stretch of road from the junction of Braddell and Thomson Roads to the junction of Mandai and Sembawang Roads, as Upper Thomson Road.

Parts of Thomson Road formed the Thomson Road Grand Prix circuit, the original Singapore Grand Prix from 1961 to 1973.

== Geography ==
The present-day Thomson Road begins at a major road junction with Keng Lee Road, Kampong Java Road, Cavenagh Road and Norfolk Road, and leads northwards through the Novena residential area. It passes by Toa Payoh before continuing on as Upper Thomson Road at the junction with Braddell Road and Lornie Road.

It skims along the western edge of Bishan and Ang Mo Kio, which also passes through quite a few private residential estates, Thomson Plaza and The Singapore Island Country Club. Towards the end, after Springleaf Estate, the road crosses junction with Mandai Road, where it continues northwards via Sembawang Road. It is also the site of Saint Joseph Institution International, Ministry of Social and Family Development, Inland Revenue Authority of Singapore, and many more.

The North–South Corridor and Expressway, which is currently under construction goes through major parts of Thomson Road.

=== Public transport ===
==== Mass Rapid Transit (MRT) ====
Various train stations ply both Upper Thomson Road and Thomson Road, including Springleaf station and the namesake Upper Thomson station on the Thomson–East Coast Line (TEL), as well as Novena station on the North–South Line (NSL).

== Gallery ==
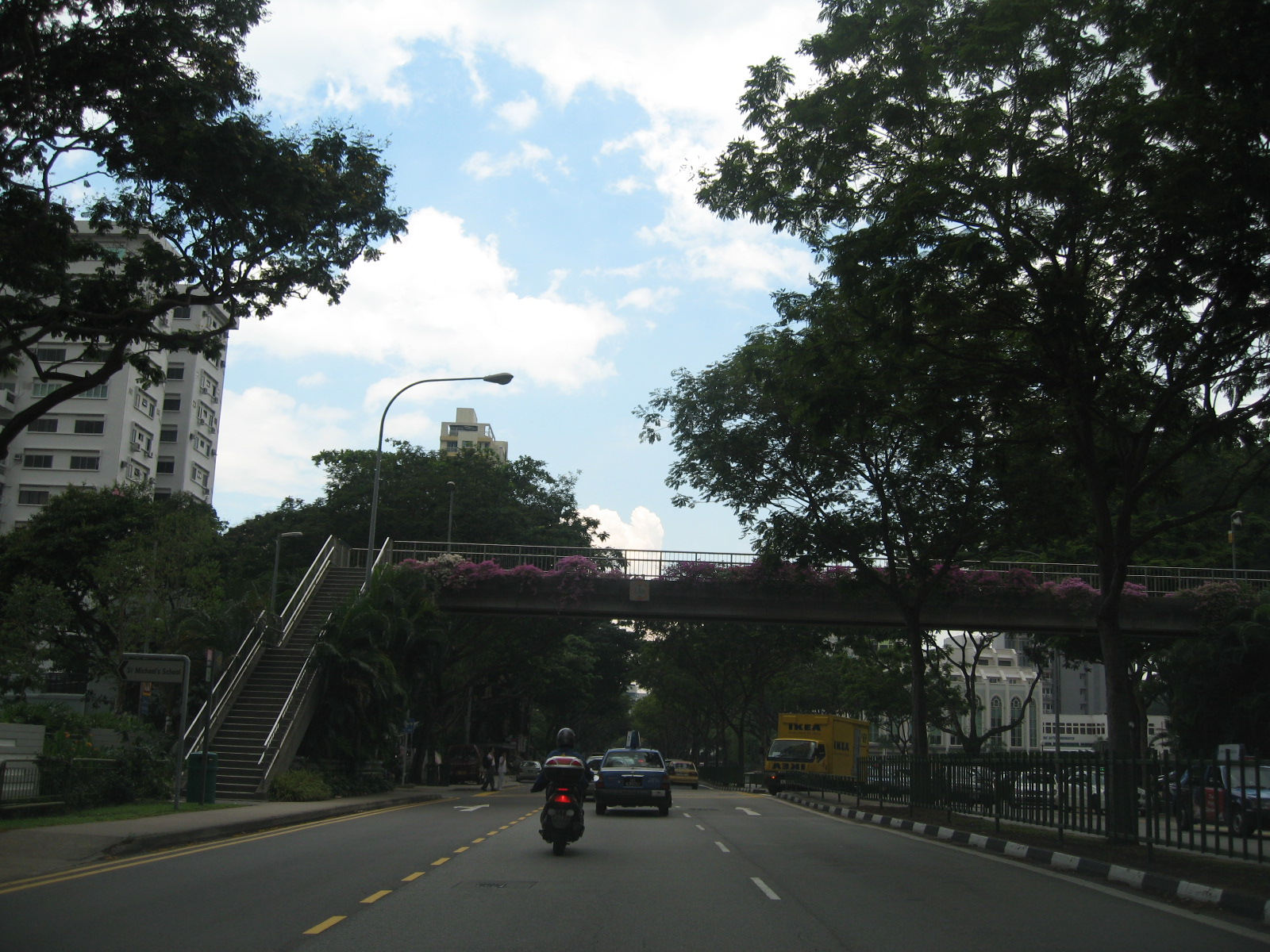
Thomson Road towards the city centre

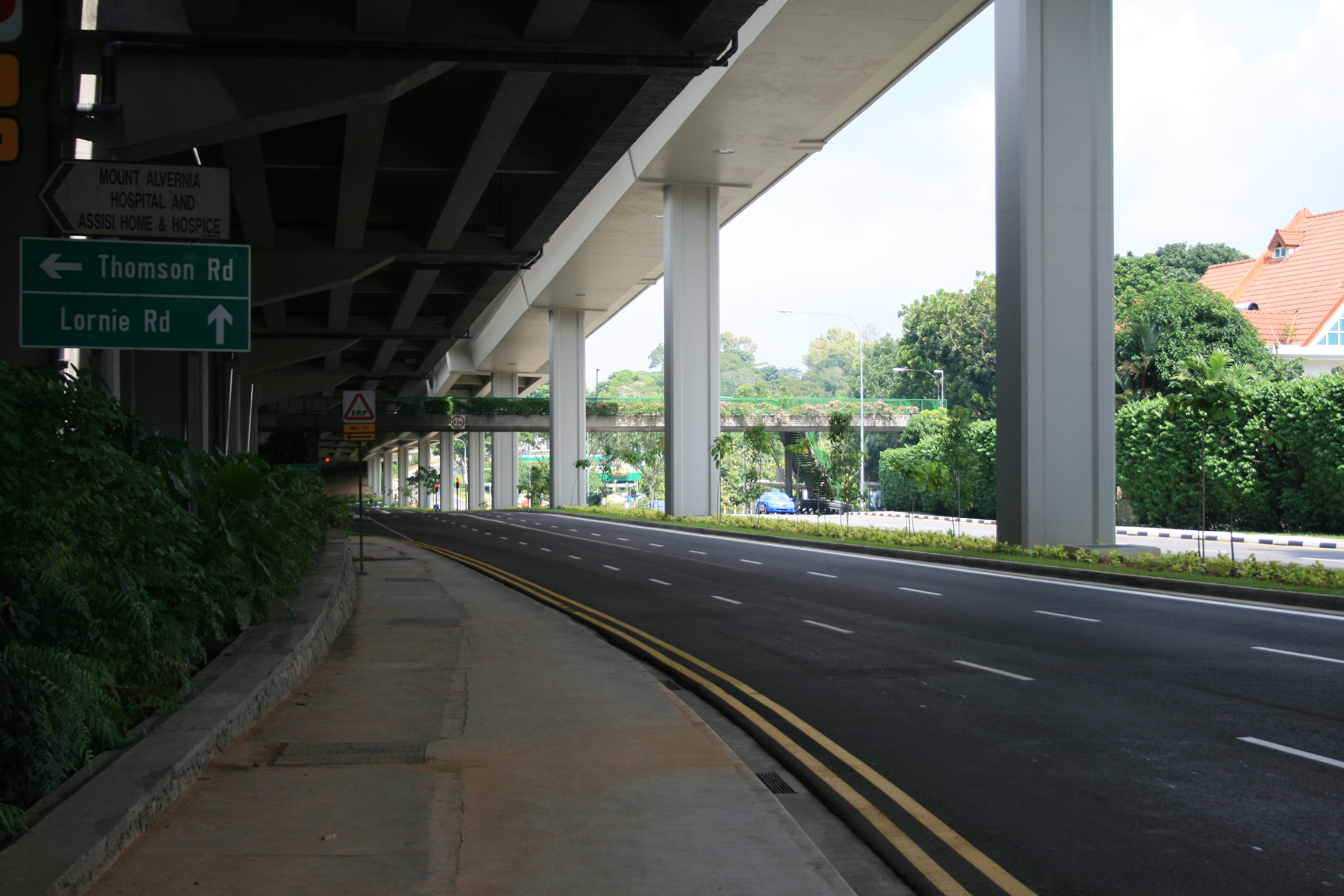
Thomson Road beneath Lornie Viaduct
