= Thomson Plaza =

- Location: Upper Thomson Road, Singapore
- Coordinates: 1°21′16.95″N 103°49′51.37″E
- Address: 301 Upper Thomson Road, Singapore 574408
- Opened: 1979
- Developer: DBS Land
- Manager: CBRE Pte Ltd
- Num. of stores: 154
- Num. of anchor tenants: 4
- Floor area: 467,298 square feet (43,413.4 m^{2})
- Floors: 4
- Public transit: TE8 Upper Thomson
- Website: thomsonplaza.com.sg

Thomson Plaza, formerly unofficially called Thomson Yaohan, is a suburban shopping mall located along Upper Thomson Road, in Singapore. Opened in 1979, Thomson Plaza is best known for having a Yaohan departmental store in the 1980s and 1990s.

== Design ==
Thomson Plaza is built over 22,400 square metres (241,000 sq ft) of land and is relatively low-rise, in keeping with the neighbourhood around the Thomson area.

Thomson Plaza is one of the first public buildings to be designed with barrier-free features from the onset. In addition to the standard escalators, ramps were incorporated into the shopping complex's design to allow people in wheelchairs to freely navigate between different floors of the complex. Other handicapped-friendly features in the complex include enlarged toilet cubicles that cater to wheelchair users and door levers, which enable people with difficulty controlling their hands to easily open doors around the complex.

== History ==
The proposal to build a residential and recreational complex along Upper Thomson Road was first approved by the Ministry of National Development in 1977 as part of its policy of decentralizing commercial activities away from Singapore's Central Business District. The contract to build this complex was awarded to Japanese construction company Ohbayashi Gumi by Development Bank of Singapore, the appointed land developer for Thomson Plaza. Initially estimated to cost SGD$22.3 million, this project was completed eventually at a cost of $38 million in 1979.

Even before its completion, Thomson Plaza attracted strong interest from retailers. 80% of its retail outlets were leased out within six months of their launch. Thomson Plaza later attracted the attention of Japanese retailer Yaohan, the pioneer of one-stop departmental stores in Singapore. At that time, Yaohan was famous for its innovative approach to customer service; its first departmental store in Plaza Singapura reportedly attracted 955,000 shoppers a week. Yaohan's store in Thomson Plaza became its third outlet in Singapore.

In 1997, the parent company of Yaohan stores in Singapore was declared insolvent due to its over-expansion and rising retail rental costs in Singapore. Thus, Yaohan closed its Thomson Plaza outlet, its last in Singapore, in 1998. Yaohan's former retail space was taken over by NTUC FairPrice supermarket chain.
