= Upper Thomson MRT station =

Mass Rapid Transit station in Singapore

Upper Thomson TE8 汤申路上段 அப்பர் தாம்சன்
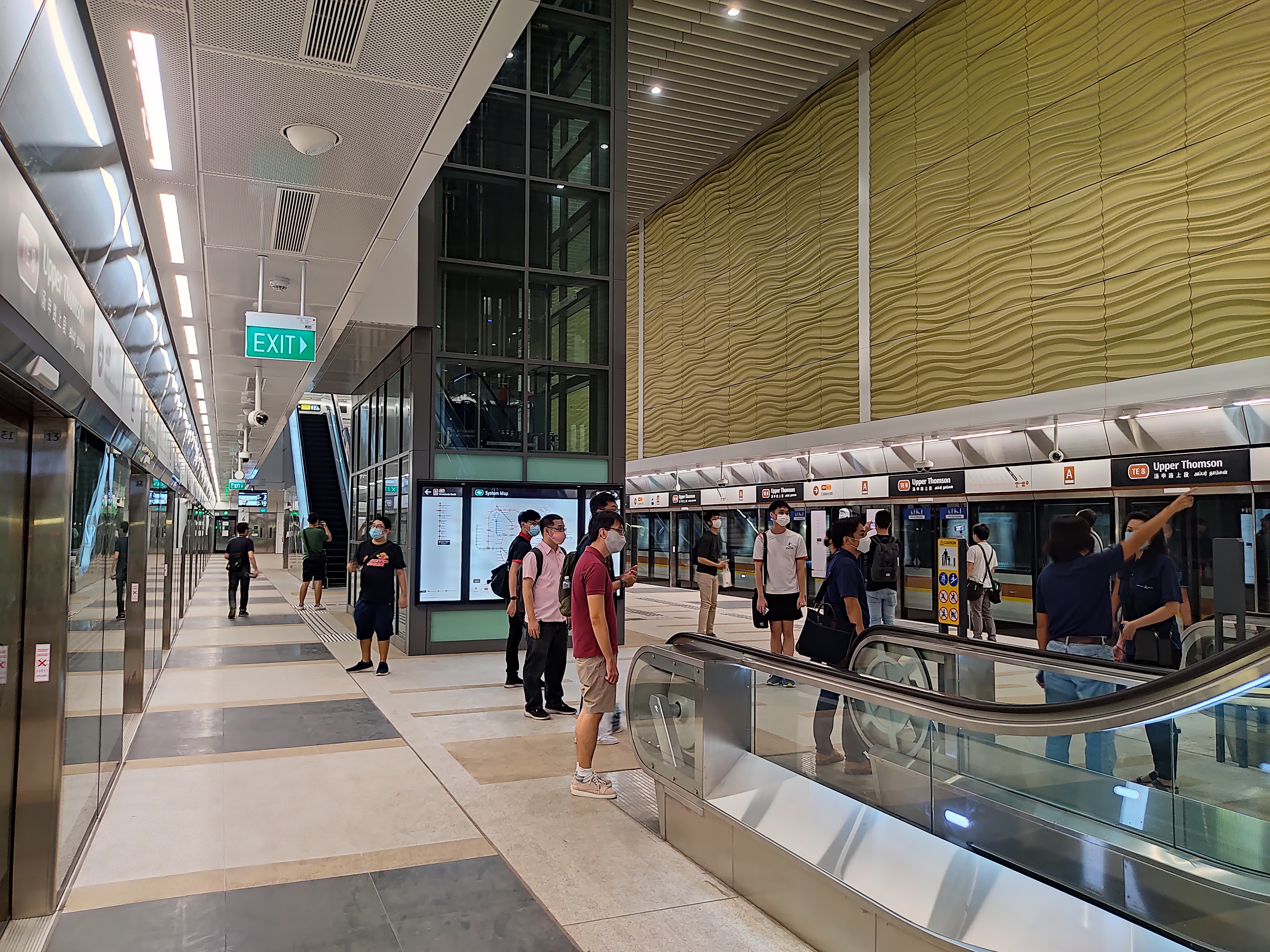
- View of the station platform

General information
- Location: 1 Jalan Keli, Singapore 577937
- Coordinates: 01°21′15″N 103°50′00″E
- System: Mass Rapid Transit (MRT) station
- Owner: Land Transport Authority
- Operator: SMRT Trains
- Line: Thomson–East Coast Line
- Platforms: 2 (1 island platform)
- Tracks: 2
- Connections: Bus, Taxi

Construction
- Structure type: Underground
- Platform levels: 1
- Accessible: Yes

Other information
- Station code: UTS

History
- Opened: 28 August 2021; 5 years ago
- Former names: Thomson Village, Thomson Park

Passengers
- June 2024: 8,878 per day

Services
Preceding station	Mass Rapid Transit	Following station
Bright Hill towards Woodlands North	Thomson–East Coast Line	Caldecott towards Bayshore
Track layout
Location
- Location within Singapore Rail

Upper Thomson MRT station is an underground Mass Rapid Transit (MRT) station on the Thomson–East Coast Line (TEL) in Thomson, Singapore. As the name suggests, it is located along Upper Thomson Road. The five entrances of the station serve various developments such as Soo Chow Estate, Thomson Plaza and the Church of the Holy Spirit.

First announced in August 2012 as part of the Thomson Line (TSL), the station was constructed as part of TEL Phase 2 (TEL2) with the merger of the TSL and the Eastern Region Line (ERL). The station's construction required multiple traffic diversions along Upper Thomson Road along with a canal. Opening on 28 August 2021 along with the TEL2 stations, Upper Thomson station features Lost In Our (Concrete) Jungle by Troy Chin as part of the Art-in-Transit programme.

== History ==
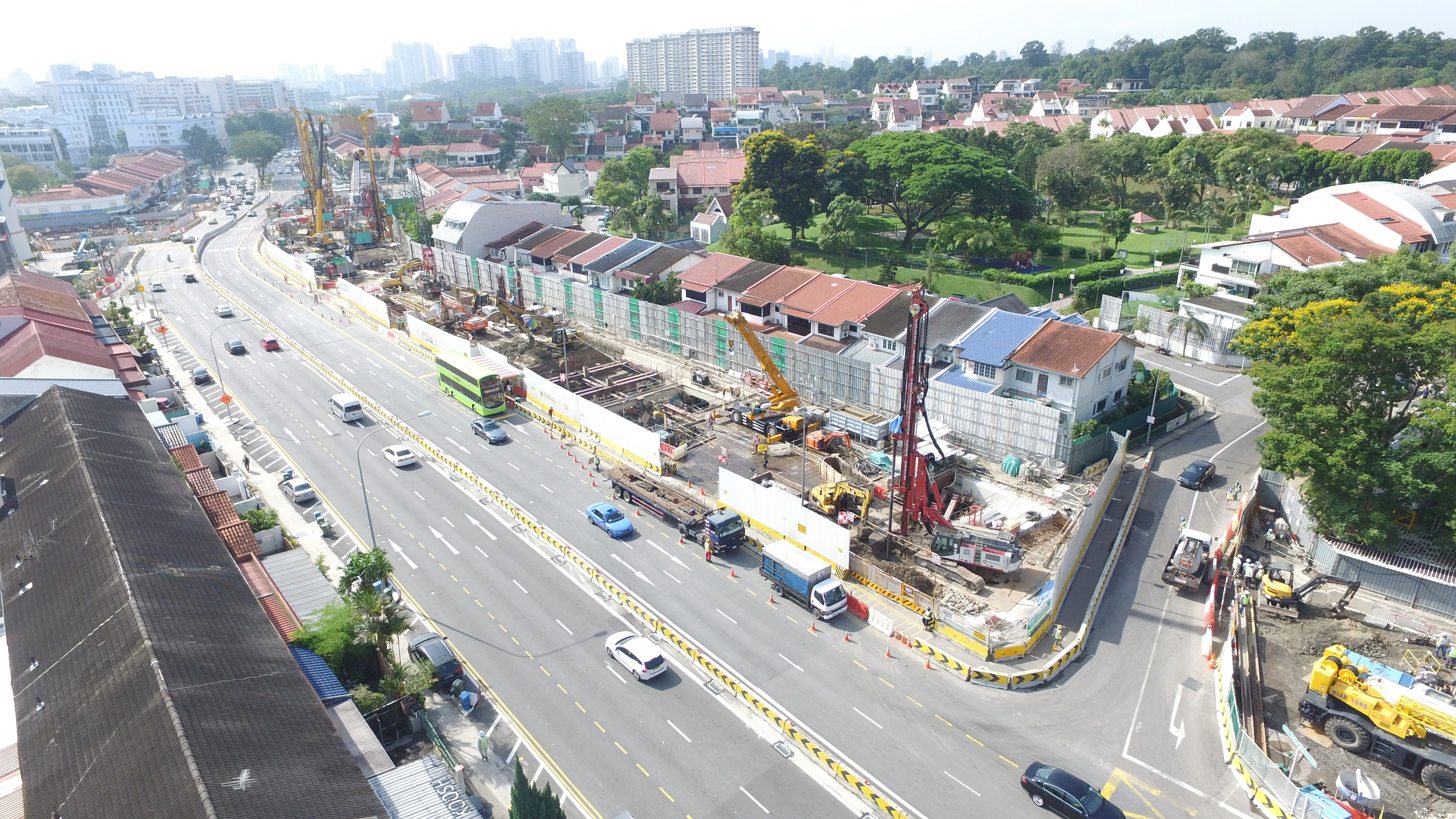
Construction site of the station

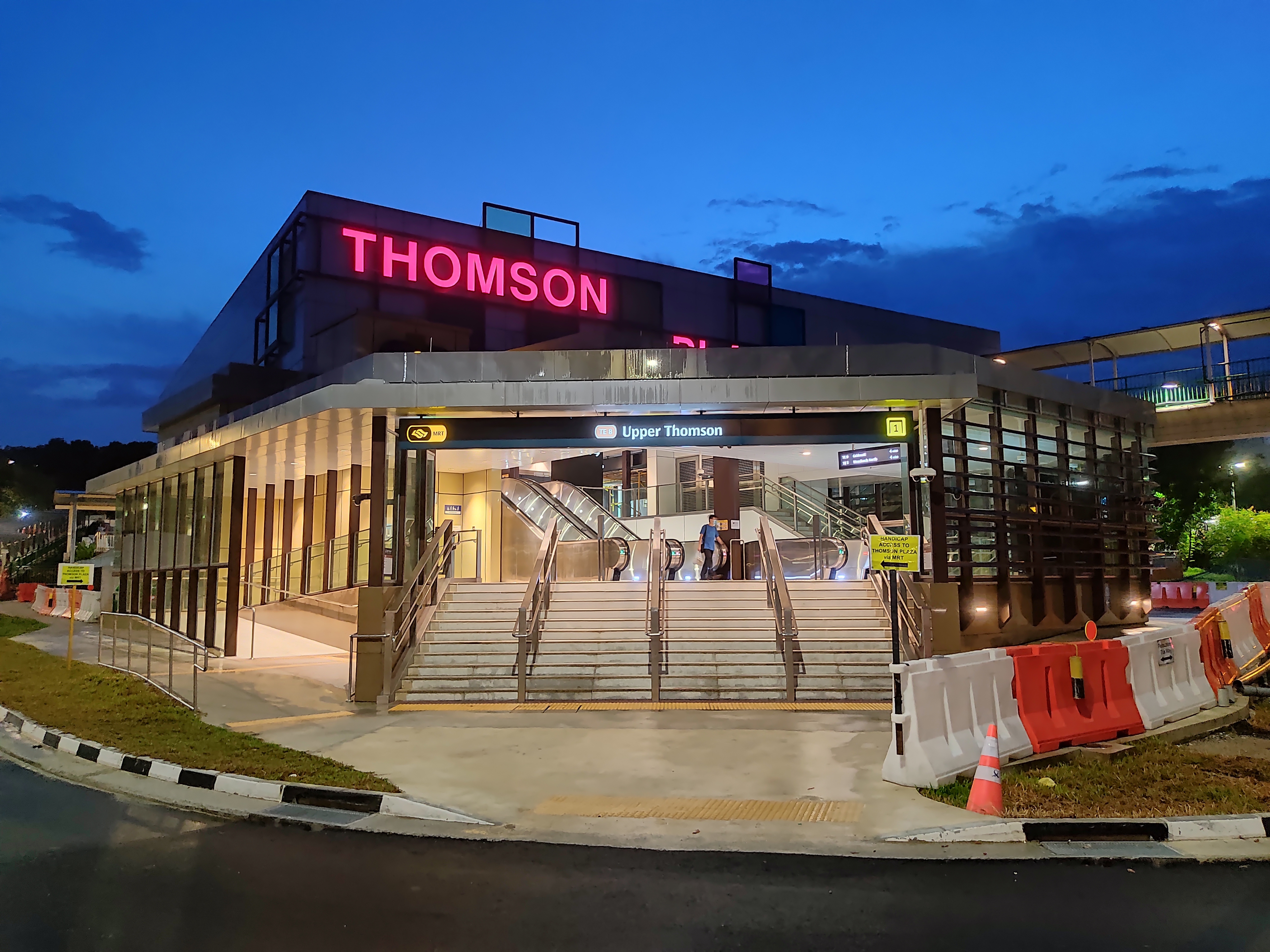
Exit 1 located close to Thomson Plaza

Upper Thomson station was first announced as part of the 22-station Thomson Line on 29 August 2012. In November 2013, the contract for the station's construction was awarded to Sato Kogyo (S) Pte. Ltd. The S$374 million (US$298.9 million) contract included building the associated tunnels. The station's construction began in 2014, with a scheduled completion of 2020.

On 15 August 2014, the Land Transport Authority (LTA) announced that TSL would merge with the ERL to form the TEL. Upper Thomson station, being part of the proposed line, would be constructed as part of TEL2, which consists of six stations between Springleaf and Caldecott.

The road above the station, Upper Thomson Road, had to be diverted through seven stages, along with utilities and a canal. Barriers were installed to minimise noise pollution, with workers draping noise curtains on heavy machinery. A linkway to one of the station's entrances was constructed using a retractable micro-tunnel boring machine. This machine installed a series of interlocking underground pipes around the passageway, allowing one side of the Upper Thomson Road to remain open as workers excavate the linkway. In order to reduce carbon emissions during construction, the station was built using environmentally-friendly materials.

In December 2016, shops along Upper Thomson Road were affected by a flood, which severely impacted their businesses as their goods were damaged. Through an inspection by the Public Utilities Board (PUB), the contractor, Sato Kogyo, was fined S$14,000 (US$11,000) for altering the draining systems around the station's site without informing the PUB. Fourteen other contractors working on other construction works were also penalised on similar charges.

With the restrictions imposed on construction works due to the COVID-19 pandemic, the TEL2 completion date was pushed to 2021. On 14 December 2020, it was further announced that the opening of TEL 2 was delayed to the third quarter of 2021 so the rail system software for the line could be reviewed. As announced during a visit by Transport Minister S. Iswaran at Caldecott station on 30 June 2021, the station began operations on 28 August 2021.

== Station details ==
Upper Thomson station serves the TEL and is between the Bright Hill and Caldecott stations. The official station code is TE8. Being part of the TEL, the station is operated by SMRT Trains. Train frequencies on the TEL range from 3 to 6 minutes. The station has five entrances, serving Soo Chow Estate and various landmarks along Upper Thomson Road, including Thomson Plaza, Church of the Holy Spirit and the LTA office at Sin Ming.

The station has a length of 228 metres (748 ft) and a depth of 20 metres (66 ft). The station walls have wave-like motifs that reflects the station's proximity to three reservoirs – MacRitchie Reservoir, Upper Peirce Reservoir and Lower Peirce Reservoir. The station is decorated by 88 animal figures, which are part of the Art-in-Transit artwork Lost in Our (Concrete) Jungle by Troy Chin. The artwork, primarily depicting long-tailed macaques, took inspiration from the nearby Central Catchment Nature Reserve. With the "hide-and-seek" concept adopted for the artwork, Chin intended for his artwork to be enjoyable and "fun" for commuters. The number of figures signifies Upper Thomson station being the 88th station involved in the Art-in-Transit programme.
