= Bukit Brown MRT station =

Future Mass Rapid Transit station in Singapore

Bukit Brown CC18 武吉布朗 புக்கிட் பிரவுன்
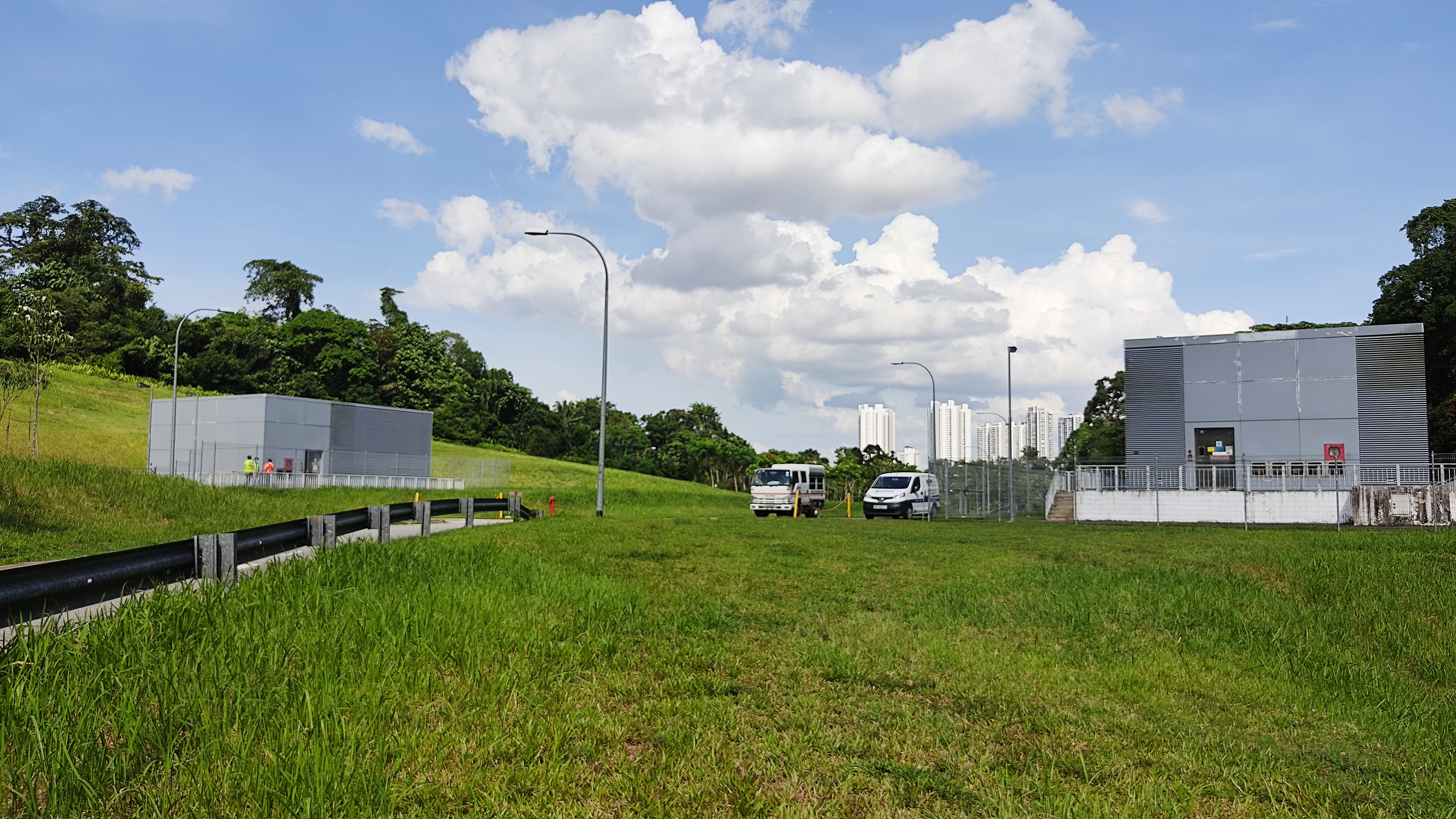
- The unopened Bukit Brown station in 2020

General information
- Location: 490 Jalan Mashhor, Singapore 299176
- Coordinates: 01°20′01″N 103°49′48″E
- System: Mass Rapid Transit (MRT) station
- Owner: Land Transport Authority
- Operator: SMRT Trains
- Line: Circle Line
- Platforms: 2 (2 side platforms)
- Tracks: 3 (including 1 siding track)

Construction
- Structure type: Underground
- Platform levels: 1

Other information
- Station code: BKB

Services
Preceding station	Mass Rapid Transit	Following station
Caldecott Clockwise	Circle Line Future service	Botanic Gardens Anticlockwise
Caldecott towards Dhoby Ghaut	Circle Line Future service	Botanic Gardens towards Prince Edward Road
Track layout
Location
- Location within Singapore Rail central area

Bukit Brown MRT station is a future (Note: The station is listed on a map published by the Land Transport Authority website in 2007.) underground Mass Rapid Transit (MRT) station on the Circle Line (CCL), located in Novena planning area, Singapore. Announced along with the 17 stations of CCL Stages 4 and 5 in November 2005, it was designated as a station to be opened in the future. This station is currently non-operational due to the lack of development and demand in the area, although there are structural provisions set for the station’s future construction. Jalan Mashhor serves the station facilities on the ground level.

== History ==
The station is named after the former Bukit Brown Cemetery, which it is situated in. Named after George Henry Brown, the first owner of the land, the cemetery was used as a Chinese burial ground between 1922 and 1973. When Stages 4 and 5 of the Circle Line were announced in November 2005, Bukit Brown was one of the three 'shell' stations on the line (Note: The other two stations were Thomson (now Caldecott) and West Coast stations (now Haw Par Villa), which opened along with the CCL Stages 4 & 5) set to be constructed in the future when there is sufficient demand in the area. Structural provisions were made during the construction of the CCL to facilitate the construction of the future station. The contract for the construction of rapid transit system facilities for Bukit Brown station was awarded to Taisei Corporation at a sum of S$391.59 million (US$231.68 million). (Note: The contract includes the construction and completion of the Adam and Farrer Stations, including 6.3-kilometre (3.9-mile) of twin bored tunnels, and rapid transit system facilities for Thomson station.)

== Station details ==
The station, when constructed, will be between Caldecott and Botanic Gardens stations. The station is located along Jalan Mashhor.
