= Farrer Road MRT station =

Mass Rapid Transit station in Singapore

Farrer Road CC20 花拉路 ஃபேரர் சாலை
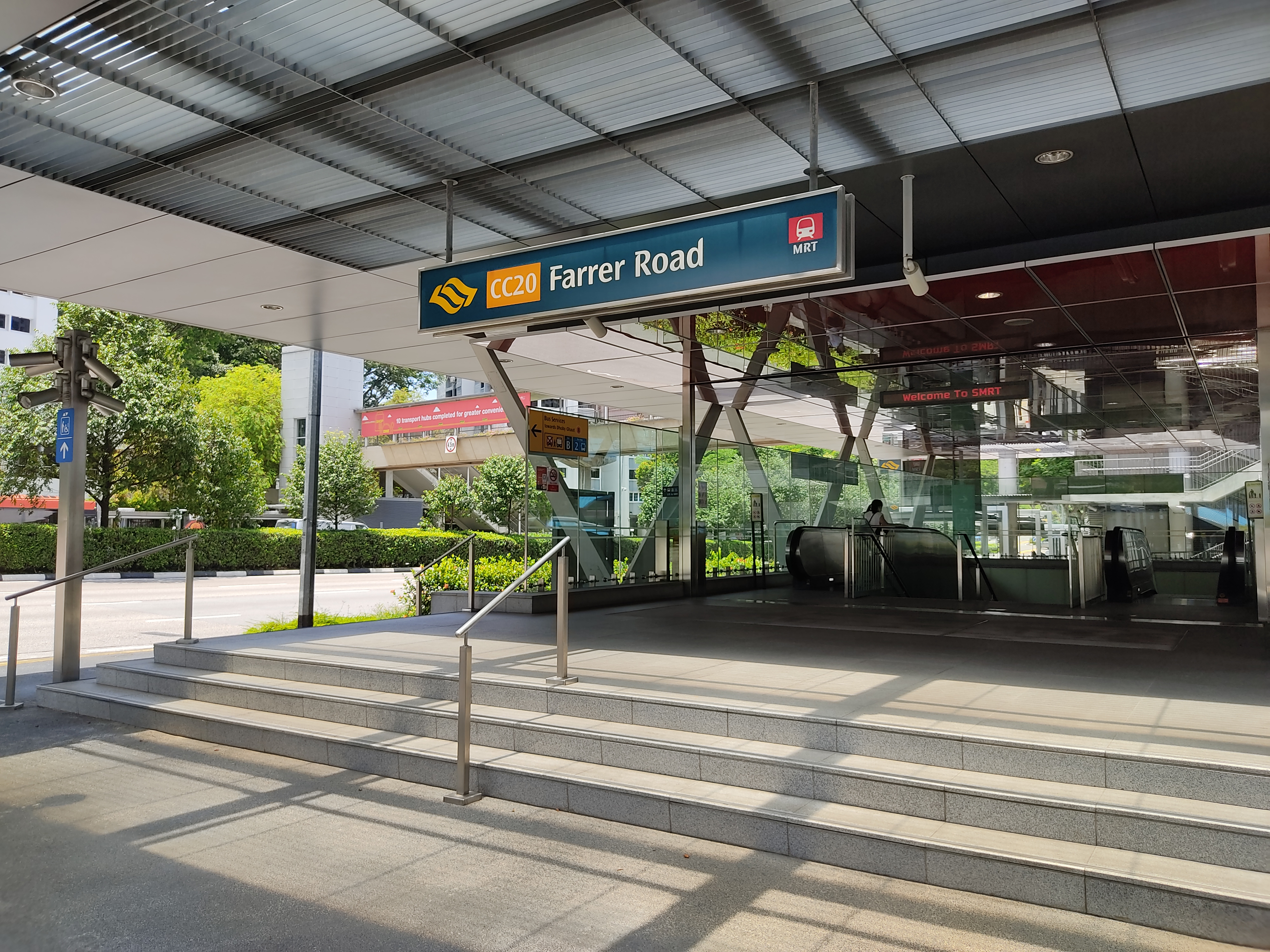
- Exit B of Farrer Road station

General information
- Location: 71 Farrer Road, Singapore 268857
- Coordinates: 01°19′02″N 103°48′27″E
- System: Mass Rapid Transit (MRT) station
- Owner: Land Transport Authority
- Operator: SMRT Trains
- Line: Circle Line
- Platforms: 2 (1 island platform)
- Tracks: 2
- Connections: Bus, Taxi

Construction
- Structure type: Underground
- Platform levels: 1
- Accessible: Yes

Other information
- Station code: FRR

History
- Opened: 8 October 2011; 15 years ago
- Former names: Farrer, Woollerton

Passengers
- June 2024: 4,576 per day

Services
| Preceding station | Mass Rapid Transit | Following station |
|---|---|---|
| Botanic Gardens Clockwise | Circle Line | Holland Village Anticlockwise |
| Botanic Gardens towards Dhoby Ghaut | Circle Line | Holland Village towards Prince Edward Road |
Track layout
Location
- Location within Singapore Rail central area

Farrer Road MRT station is an underground Mass Rapid Transit (MRT) station on the Circle Line, located along the boundary of Farrer Court (Bukit Timah) and Tyersall (Tanglin) planning areas, Singapore. It is built underneath Farrer Road, the thoroughfare which gives the station its name, and is located near the Farrer Gardens Estate.

Farrer Road was named after Roland John Farrer, who was President of the Municipal Commissioners from 1919 to 1931. To avoid confusion with Farrer Park MRT station, the station was renamed to Farrer Road on 11 January 2007. The station serves the nearby Farrer Gardens housing estate, many condominiums and private homes, schools, and places of worship.

Farrer Road station is built underneath its namesake road, between the junctions of Empress Road and Woollerton Park.

== History ==
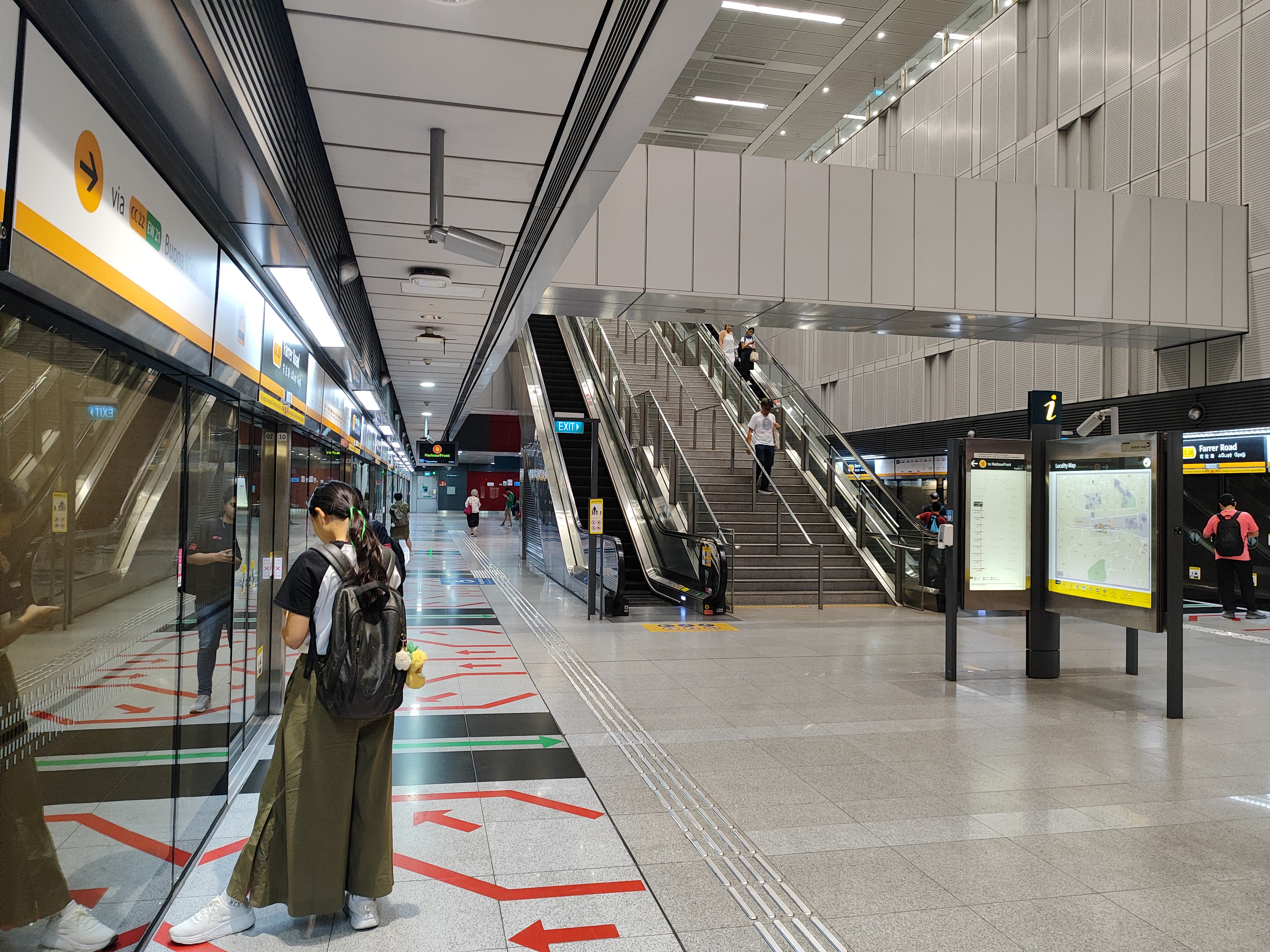
Platforms of Farrer Road MRT station.

The junction of Farrer Road and Empress Road had been realigned from 1 December 2004, this marks the start of construction of Farrer Road MRT station. The station was renamed from Farrer to Farrer Road on 11 January 2007.

On 24 May 2008, a section of Cornwall Gardens above a section between Holland Village and Farrer Road stations along the Circle Line collapsed, creating a 3 metre deep hole. No one was injured, but some of the households lost their access to cable TV and Internet, as well as the water supply. This is the third road that caved in during the construction of the Circle Line.

It is often mistaken for Farrer Park MRT station; as such, station masters have put up a sign informing both locals and tourists that Farrer Road MRT is not the one located near the famous Mustafa Centre that they likely wanted to visit.

== Details ==
The station – located between the planning areas of Bukit Timah and Tanglin in the Central Region of Singapore – runs parallel with Farrer Road. It has two exits serving various nearby landmarks such as the Empress Road Market & Food Centre, Nanyang Primary School, and St. Margaret's Secondary School. Farrer Road station is wheelchair accessible and also has bicycle facilities.

Like other CCL stage 1–5 stations, Farrer Road was designed to have a "high-tech" architecture such that it would "not go out of style" in the future, according to the writer Colin Cheong. A tactile system of tiles with rounded or elongated raised studs guides visually impaired commuters through the station, with dedicated tactile routes that connect the station entrances to the platforms. Wider fare gates allow easier access for wheelchair users into the station.

The artwork featured in this station under the Art-in-Transit programme is Art Lineage by Erzan Adam. In this community project, using lines as a key element to emphasise unity in art and in the community, members of the public were invited to paint coloured lines in any way they liked over three canvasses. The artist then digitised and overlayered the images to create a single piece, which is now displayed on the lift shaft in the station.
