= Adam Road Food Centre =

Hawker centre in Bukit Timah, Singapore

- 亚当路熟食中心 (Chinese); Pusat Makanan Adam Road (Malay) ஆடம் ரோடு உணவு மையம் (Tamil)
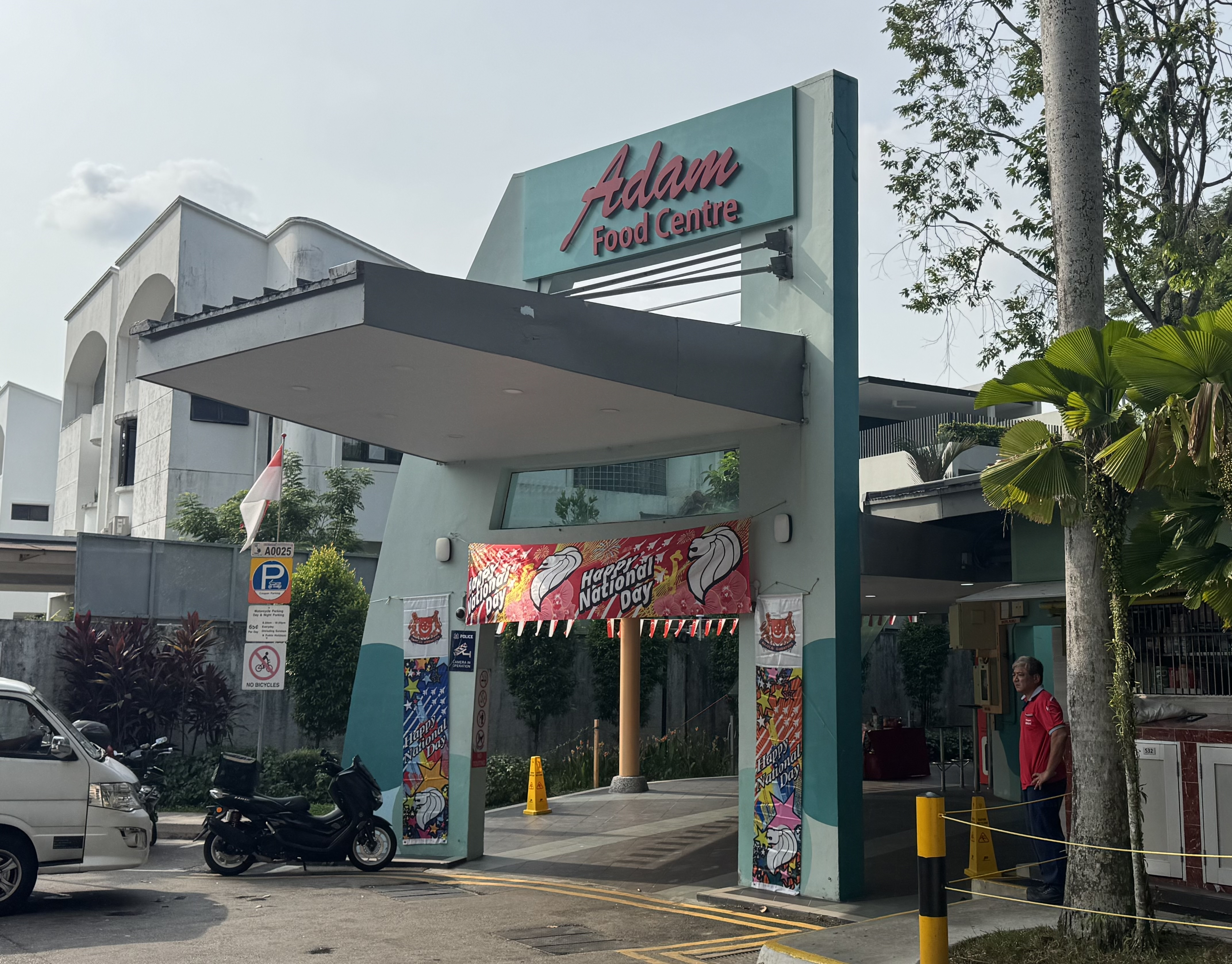
- Adam Road Food Centre in 2026
- Interactive map of the Adam Road Food Centre area
- Alternative names: Adam Food Centre

General information
- Location: Bukit Timah, Singapore, 2 Adam Road; 289876
- Coordinates: 1°19′27″N 103°48′52″E
- Opened: 28 September 1974; 51 years ago
- Cost: S$224,500
- Landlord: National Environment Agency

Other information
- Number of stores: 32

Adam Road Food Centre, also known as the Adam Food Centre, is a hawker centre located next to the Bukit Timah Canal in Bukit Timah, Singapore.

== History ==
=== 1974 to 1979 ===
The hawker centre was opened by Minister for Law Edmund W. Barker on 28 September 1974. It was built at a cost of $224,500 to replace the hawker centre in between Bukit Timah Road and Dunearn Road, which was demolished to make way for the Adam Road flyover.

=== 1980s to 1999 ===
In February 1987, the Ministry of Environment launched a pilot project for hawkers to use disposable polystyrene crockery, plastic cutlery and wooden chopsticks, citing hygiene concerns with existing melamine ware. Adam Road, along with hawker centres at Cuppage, Newton, Whitley and Chomp Chomp, were the ones chosen for the project.

Some hawkers interviewed by The Straits Times felt that they had no choice but to abide by the Ministry's wishes, and hawkers at Adam Road mentioned that disposable plates were only used when enforcement officers from the Ministry appeared at the hawker centre. The hawkers also said that there was a 20% to 50% drop in business, and 30% to 50% increase in the cost of disposables. In a quick survey conducted by The Sunday Times, 12 out of 15 patrons said they preferred proper crockery and cutlery. However, in a survey conducted by the Ministry in early 1988, most respondents rated disposable crockery as a "good/very good idea".

Nevertheless, in 1989, Minister for Environment Ahmad Mattar announced that using disposable crockery would not be compulsory, citing complains from hawkers and patrons.

=== 2000s to present ===
The centre underwent a five-month million upgrading in 2002, after which it became the first hawker centre in Singapore to utilise solar panels. The renovation works cost $1.73 million. According to Sam Chua of Today, the centre prior to the upgrading was a "stuffy little place with a less-than-clean environment but really good food", while the centre after the upgrading was "clean, bright and well-ventilated" with "even better" food.

The hawker centre was placed on the Bukit Timah Heritage Trail by the National Heritage Board in July 2007. It underwent a six-week facelift beginning in February 2008. In July 2013, Joe Biden visited the centre with his son-in-law Howard Krein while on his first official visit to Singapore as the Vice President of the United States. On 16 November 2018, Justin Trudeau visited the centre while on his first visit to Singapore as the Prime Minister of Canada.

In 2023, three of the stalls in the hawker centre, Adam Rd Noo Cheng Big Prawn Noodle, Bahrakath Mutton Soup and Selamat Datang Warong Pak Sapari, received the Michelin Bib Gourmand Award. Another prominent stall is Selera Rasa, a nasi lemak stall which Hassanal Bolkiah, the Sultan of Brunei, reportedly patronises for breakfast while on trips to Singapore. Its nasi lemak has also been served to Joko Widodo, the President of Indonesia. According to the National Heritage Board website Roots, the stall is "arguably" the hawker centre's "most famous" stall. Other popular stalls include Cheng Ji and Adam's Indian Rojak. The hawker centre underwent renovations from 1 October to 31 December 2023. It reopened on 1 January 2024.
