= Thomson, Singapore =

Thomson
- Subzone of Bishan Planning Area

Name transcription(s)
  - Chinese: 汤申
  - Pinyin: Tāngshēn
  - Malay: Thomson
  - Tamil: தாம்சன்
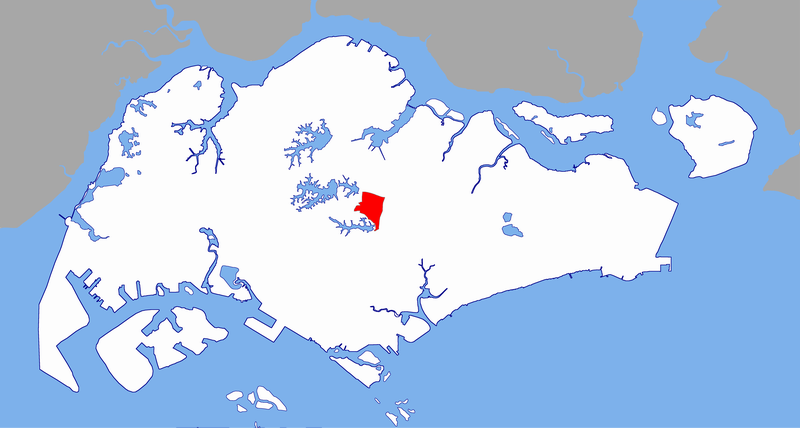
- Country: Singapore

Thomson is a subzone within the planning area of Bishan, Singapore. The area is located close to the Central Water Catchment where some of Singapore's reservoirs are located, including MacRitchie Reservoir, Upper Peirce Reservoir and Lower Peirce Reservoir.

== Etymology ==
Thomson was named after its namesake road, Thomson Road. Previously known as Seletar Road, this road was subsequently renamed "Thomson Road" during British colonial rule, named after John Turnbull Thomson, a British government surveyor who also helped to lay this road.

== Housing ==
The convenient location, due as its proximity and the ease of access to the Central Area, popular schools, parks and other parts of Singapore; combined with an aesthetic environment that is near forest and reservoirs tends to make property prices in the area significantly higher than other parts of Singapore. Due to this fact, a large number of condominiums can be found in Thomson as well. These include the likes of Meadows@Peirce, Thomson Grove, Lattice One, Adana@Thomson, Peirce View, Flame Tree Park and Thomson Grand. Private housing makes up the bulk of the housing in Thomson with a modicum of HDB flats and shophouses. The low rise housing in the area is notable and this stretches from MacRitchie Reservoir to the Peirce Reservoirs, consisting of neighbourhoods like the Thomson Ridge area, the Little Canada area and Venus drive, and goes up to Jalan Rebana and passing through the junction of Ang Mo Kio towards Seraya Crescent, Nemesu Avenue, Casuarina Road and Jalan Leban, arching at the Thomson Hills and Happy Park areas and culminating at the Teacher's Estate which lies along Yio Chu Kang road.

== Infrastructure ==
=== Transportation ===
The area also contains one of the oldest roads in Singapore, which is also one of the longest and tends to be a vital link from the northern part of Singapore to the Central Area and the Downtown Core, as well as the rest of the island. The road is split into two lengths, Thomson Road, and Upper Thomson Road.

Along Upper Thomson Road, there is also the Upper Thomson MRT station that runs along the Thomson–East Coast Line.

=== Recreation ===
There is a variety of popular food establishments, such as roti prata shops, cafes, bars, and eateries, along the main road which runs through the area.

== See also ==
- Thomson Road Grand Prix circuit
