= SSIS =

SSIS may refer to:

- Self-Styled Islamic State, a name used for the Islamic State
- Saigon South International School
- Scandinavian Society for Iranian Studies
- Shanghai Singapore International School
- Suzhou Singapore International School
- SQL Server Integration Services, a component of the Microsoft SQL Server database software that can be used to perform data migration tasks.
- State Security Investigations Service, former Egyptian intelligence service
- Swiss School in Singapore
