= Holland Road Shopping Centre =

Shopping centre in Singapore

Coordinates: 1°18′38″N 103°47′44″E

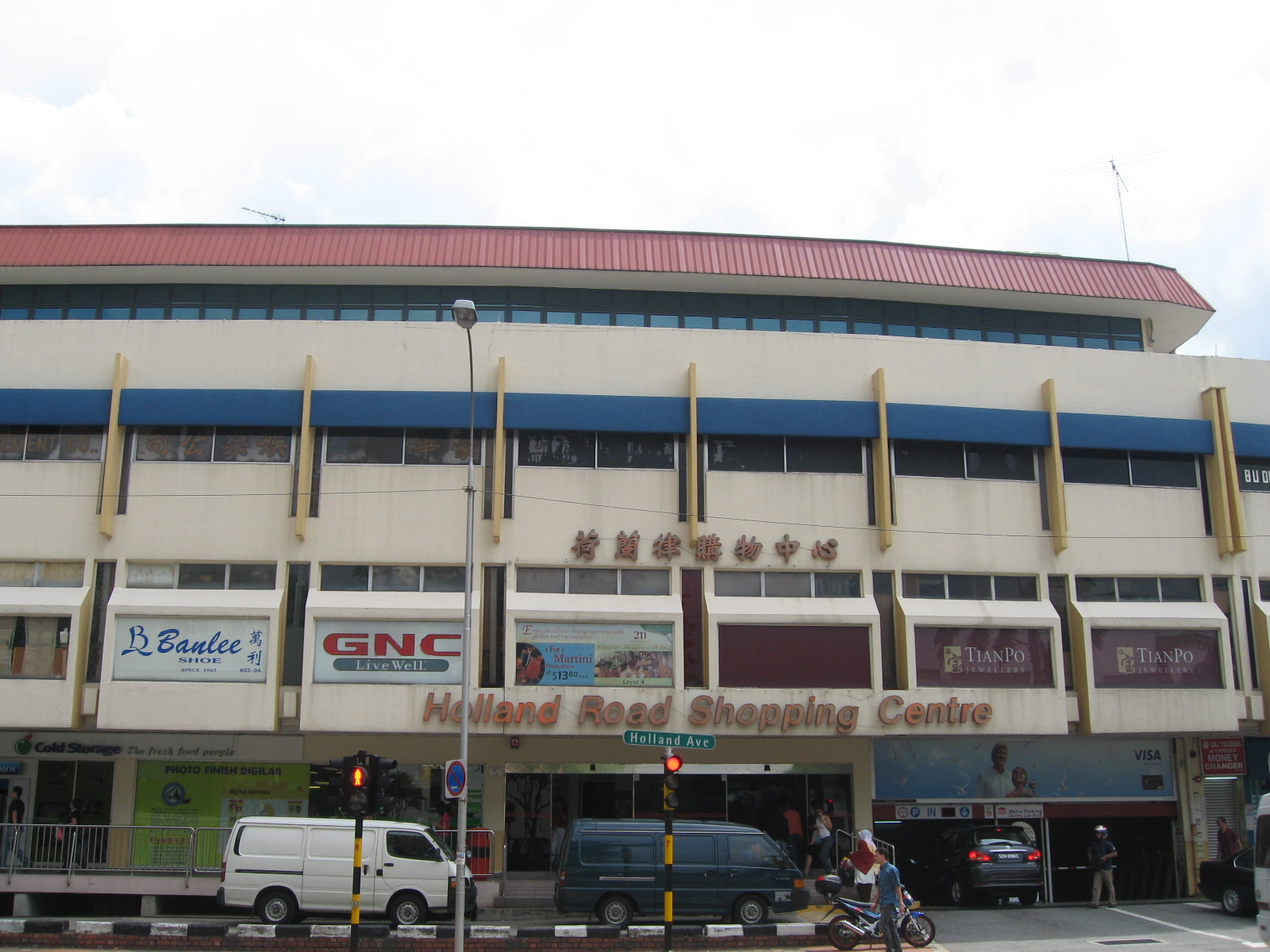
The centre in 2006

Holland Road Shopping Centre is a shopping centre on Holland Avenue in Holland Village, Singapore. The centre, which was once frequented by expatriates, had "become a shadow of its former self" by the 2010s, with many former tenants being replaced by nail parlours and declining patronage as a result of the opening of newer malls in its vicinity.

== History ==
The crescent-shaped complex, billed as a "one-stop" shopping centre, opened for business on 25 February 1971. It was built by the Nng family through Song Lim Developments Pte. Ltd. In September, The Straits Times reported that it was "patronised even by the girls working in town because of the attraction of lower prices." The centre was one of three suburban shopping centres to have been built in Singapore in the first half of the 1970s, along with the Katong Shopping Centre and the Queensway Shopping Centre. However, according to author Loo Lee Sim, the complex only became a "full-fledged" shopping centre following a 1977 expansion which introduced 61 more retail units, along with a supermarket and an emporium.

The complex, which aimed to cater towards expatriates in the area, "sustained the reputation of Holland Village as an expatriate neighbourhood." It had a Fitzpatrick's and a Jumbo Coffeehouse, which were the first Western-style supermarket and the "first western coffee joint" in the Holland Village neighbourhood respectively. According to The Straits Times, in the centre's heyday, it "attracted expatriates, Singaporeans and tourists on the hunt for furniture, art and antiques, as well as festive decorations." By 1980, it had several "dressmaking boutiques", a florist, a pharmaceutical shop, a mini-bookstore, a hardware store and several sports shops, in addition to the supermarket. Francis Chin of the New Nation wrote in June that the centre was "marked by an air of small-town informality", with keymakers and cobblers offering their services out front and goods that "spill out from shops on all three floors." Chin wrote that the products sold in the "60-odd shops" at the centre ranged from "giant cushions to power drills, sophisticated pre-primary learning aids to indoor plants, Peruvian rugs to Indian brassware". It features a 78-metre-long frontage along Holland Avenue and is located at the entrance of the Holland Village and Chip Bee Gardens neighbourhoods.

Sim wrote in 1984 that there was an "attachment of Europeans" who came "from all parts of Singapore" to the centre. She wrote that they would "patronize the numerous handicraft, curios and antique and tailoring establishments" at the centre. According to Sim, the "link of the Europeans to Holland Village can be traced to the presence of British military prior to 1971." In November 1988, Song Lim Developments, which had already sold off 40 per cent of the property by then, put up the rest of the centre for sale. The part of the centre put up for sale included nearly 30 units, the 660 sqm Penthouse Restaurant and the 1,442 sqm basement car park, which were located on the first three storeys of both the original section and the extension of the four-storey building, occupying over 2,000 sqm, and estimated to be worth $17 million to $20 million.

It was reported in The Straits Times that by April 2014, many tenants at the centre had been replaced by dozens of nail bars, which caused a "lack of variety" at the centre. Another reason for the centre's decline was the opening of nearby malls such as Jem, Westgate, Clementi Mall and Star Vista. In January 2015, it was announced that the centre's tenants had had their rent cut by 20 to 30 per cent in an attempt to "breathe new life into the ageing mall." The centre also underwent a $100,000, which involved the installation of new glass doors and the changing of ceiling lights.

In September 2016, Macau businessman Loi Keong Kuong bought over the seven strata units leased to Cold Storage for $61 million. The units had previously been put up for sale through an Expression of Interest exercise in June 2014 and were then valued at around $92 million. However, it was taken off the property market soon after the exercise concluded in the following month. On 14 October 2019, it was announced that the 47-lot carpark in the basement level of the centre was to be put up for sale through Expression of Interest with an indicative price in the range of $32 million. Its tenants then included a Cold Storage supermarket, a United Overseas Bank outlet, and outlets of the Watsons and Guardian pharmacies. The Expression of Interest was to close on 20 November.

== Notable shops ==
The EMF Bookstore opened for business on the second floor of the centre in 1987. By March 2012, the store was largely relying on regulars. However, Mary Ong, then the owner of the bookstore, claimed that while the opening of the nearby Holland Village MRT station had increased the crowdedness of the centre, most of the people only came into the store to browse without buying anything and that the increased activity had instead driven away the store's regulars, who found the shop to be "no more a quiet, peaceful place." The store closed down on 27 February 2014 due to rising rent and operating costs. It reopened at the Fusionopolis complex at one-north on 15 May. Jose Hong of The Straits Times wrote: "Book lovers who went to EMF Bookstore could buy their favourite tomes, and get most of their money back if they returned the books within about a month. In its heyday, the EMF book rental chain operated at least six stores islandwide." The centre's owner convinced EMF Bookstores to reopen at the centre in January 2015 after cutting its rent by an undisclosed amount.

In the 1990s, G. P. Thambi, whose family operated a newspaper distributor, bought a magazine store in the centre, which became Thambi Magazine. By then, the store, which had been there for over two decades, had already become a "veritable institution in the area". Angelica Tan of Weekend East wrote in 1998 that the store featured over 3,500 titles of English-language magazines and newspapers. In 2024, Perithambi Senthil Murugam, then the owner of Thambi Magazine, which was "one of the most famous shops" at the centre, decided to move the shop elsewhere as the centre's management had asked him to remove shelves that had been placed outdoors, which Murugam thought would "defeat the tradition of having an open display or a “magazine cave” which has been with the business since its inception."

Brothers Lim Choo Kuan and Lim Chor Pian established the Lim's Arts and Crafts business selling decorative household items on the first floor after being told by a supplier that products such as chests made of Camphor wood would sell well at the centre. The business was successful and the brothers acquired a unit on the third floor a few years later to expand their business. Following the completion of the expansion, they acquired three units on the second floor of the new wing. Two years after that, they bought two more units. In 1985, the brothers began selling jewellery. City Weekly reported in September 1997 that the shop sold handicraft products from Indonesia, Thailand and the Philippines. The newspaper called Lim's Arts and Crafts shop on the second floor a "collector's treasure trove". By then, the family had also established a cafe at its home furnishing store. Francis Chin wrote in June 1980 that the "shop sells nearly everything a department store offers", and that "most items are arranged haphazardly. Chin also noted that the shop featured large paper lanterns made in Taiwan that "nearly block out the ceiling." By April 2014, then-Lim's Art and Living chief executive C. K. Lim had come to own 6,000 sqft of space at the centre, half of which was occupied by the arts and crafts shop while the rest were rented out to shops selling spectacles, clothes and beer.
