= Bukit Timah =

Area in Central Region, Singapore

- Planning Area and HDB Estate

Other transcription(s)
  - Malay: Bukit Timah (Rumi) بوکيت تيمه (Jawi)
  - Chinese: 武吉知马 (Simplified) 武吉知馬 (Traditional); Wǔjí Zhīmǎ (Pinyin); Bú-kit Ti-má (Hokkien POJ)
  - Tamil: புக்கிட் திமா Pukkiṭ timā (Transliteration)
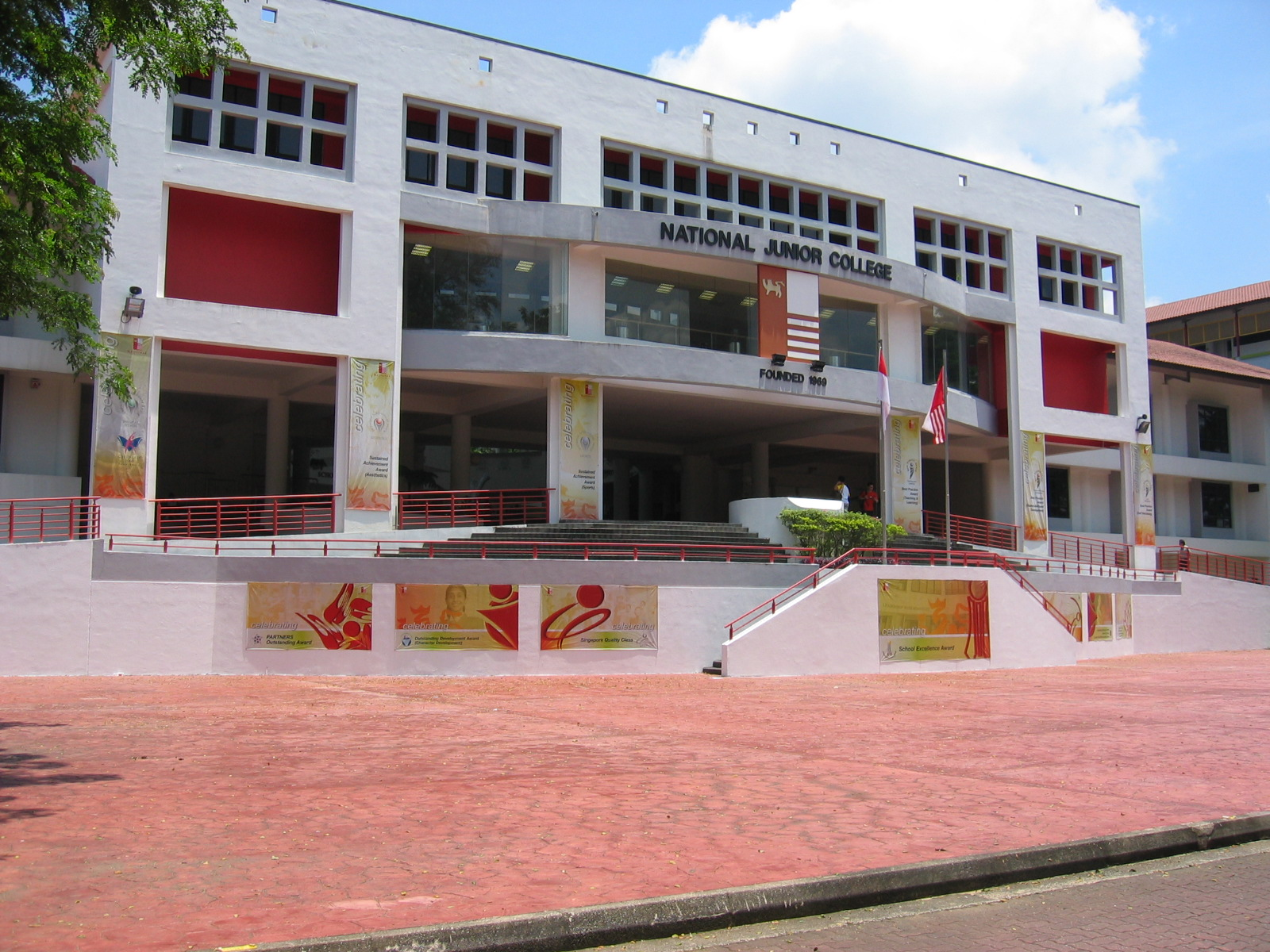
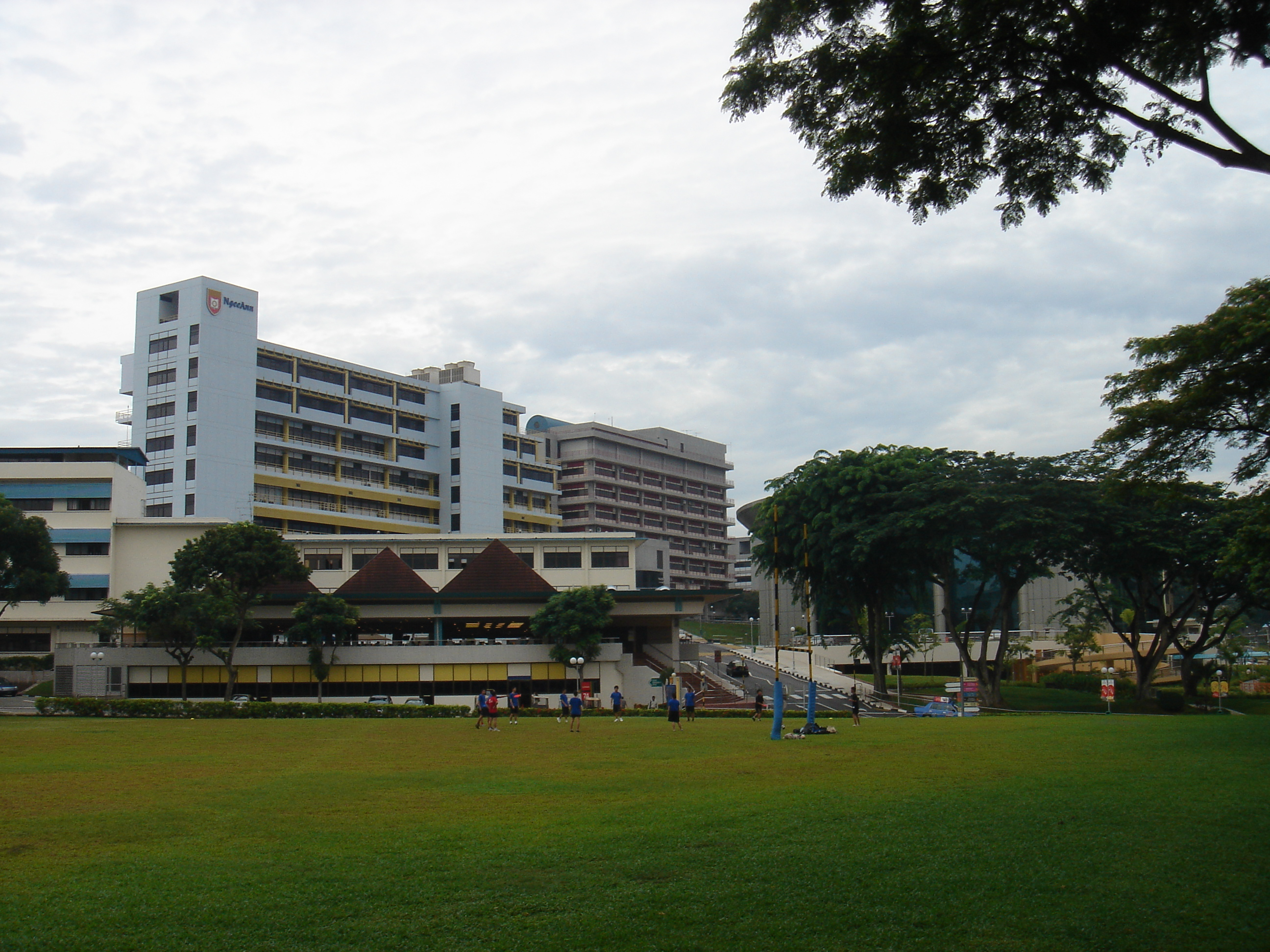
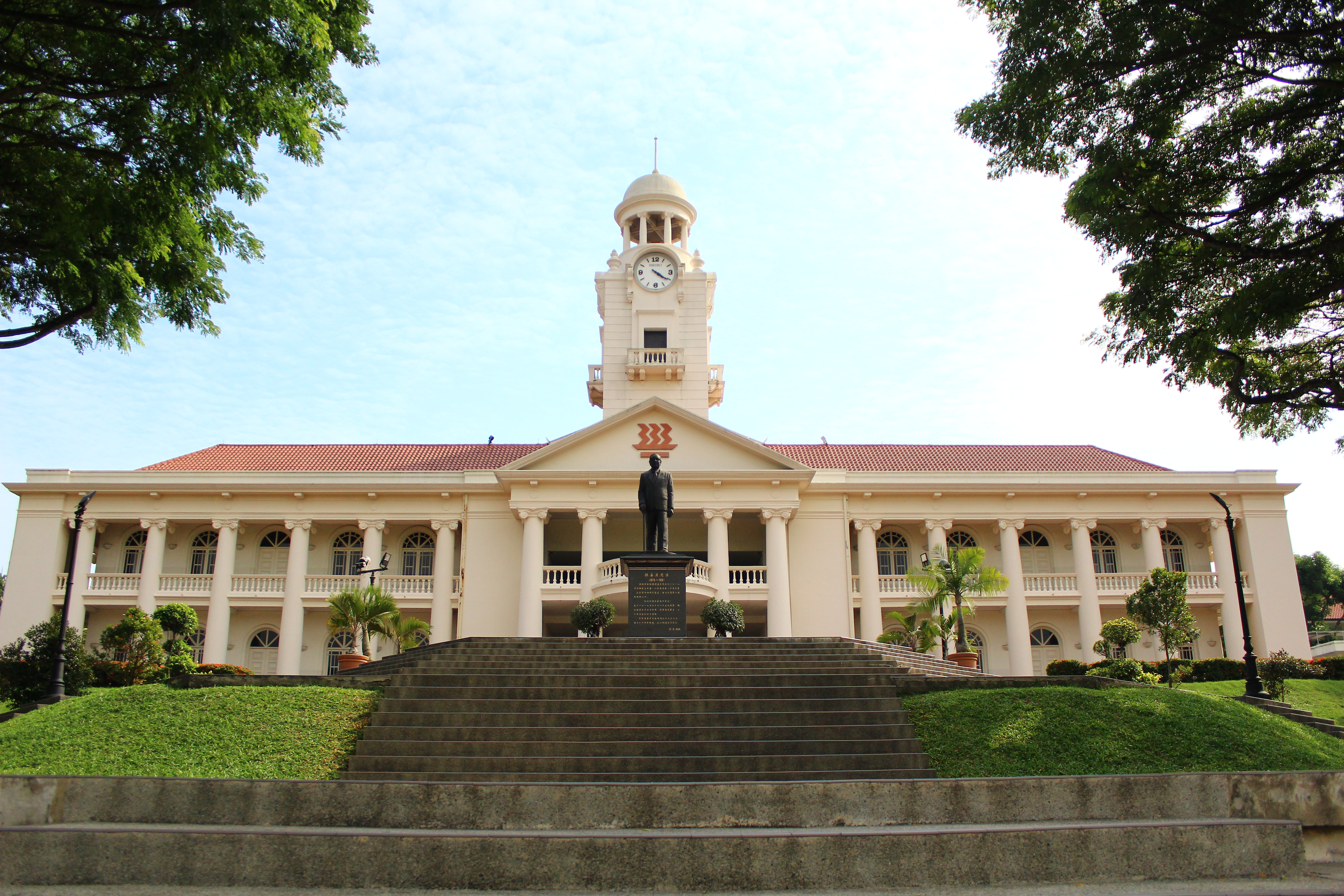
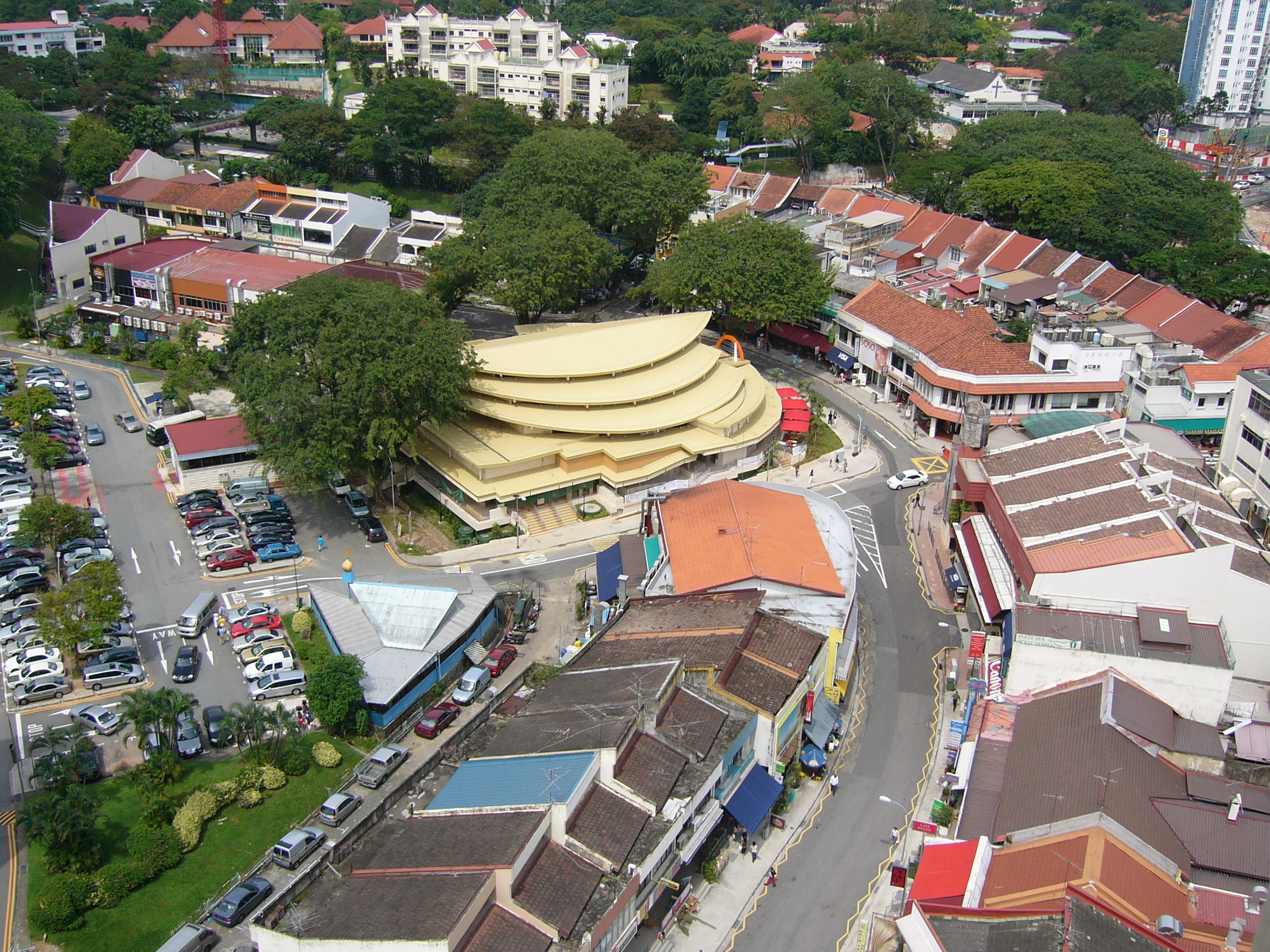
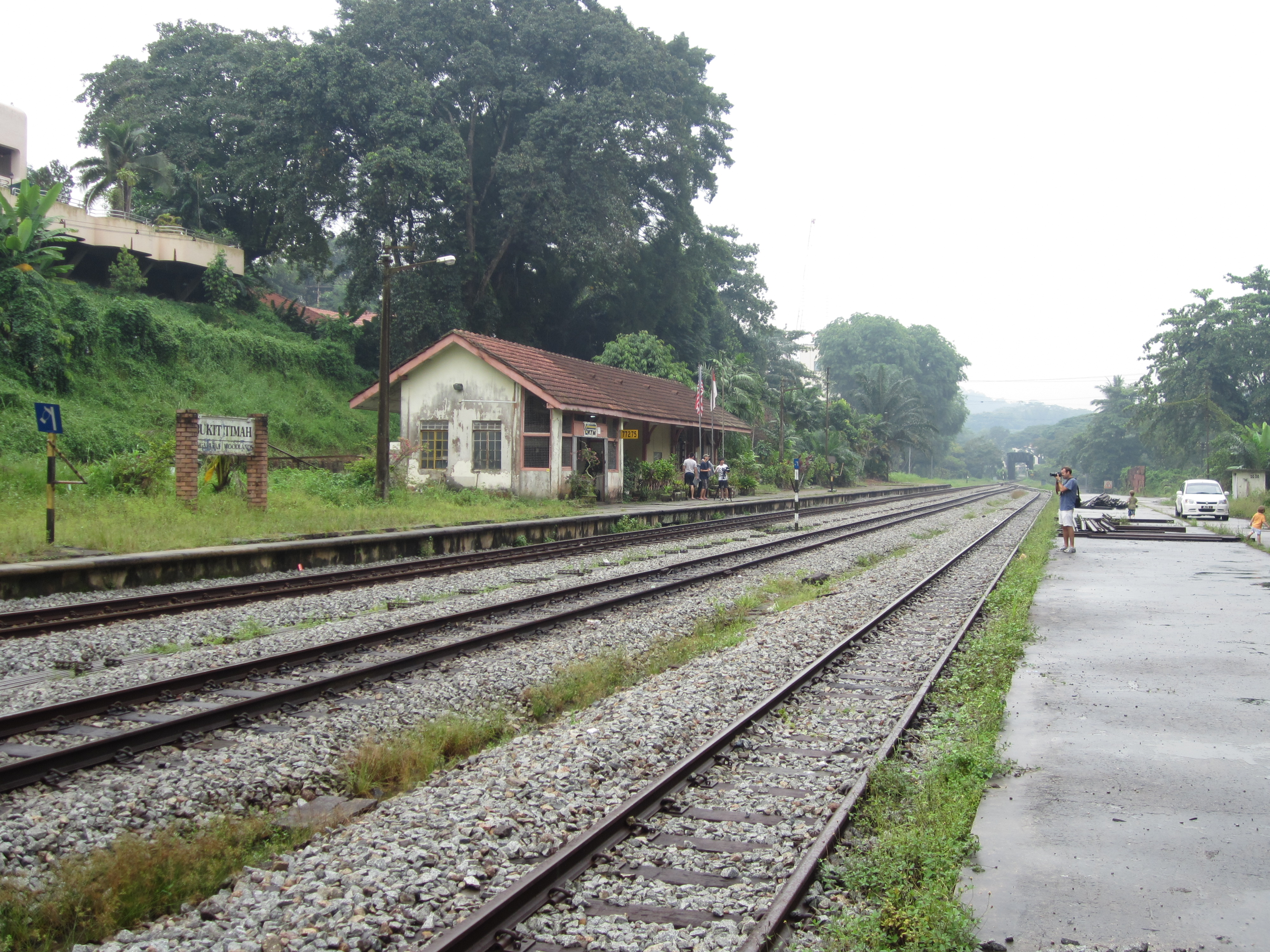
- From top left to right: National Junior College, Ngee Ann Polytechnic, The Chinese High School Clock Tower Building, Aerial view of the Bukit Timah portion of Holland Village, former Bukit Timah railway station
- Interactive map of Bukit Timah
- Bukit Timah in Singapore
- Coordinates: 1°19′45.88″N 103°48′7.48″E
- Country: Singapore
- Region: Central Region
- CDCs: Central Singapore CDC; North West CDC; South West CDC
- Town councils: Bishan-Toa Payoh Town Council; Holland-Bukit Panjang Town Council; Jurong-Clementi Town Council; Tanjong Pagar Town Council
- Constituencies: Bishan–Toa Payoh GRC; Holland–Bukit Timah GRC; Jurong East–Bukit Batok GRC; Tanjong Pagar GRC

Government
  - Mayors: Central Singapore CDC: Denise Phua; North West CDC: Alex Yam; South West CDC: Low Yen Ling
  - Members of Parliament: Bishan–Toa Payoh GRC: Chee Hong Tat; Holland–Bukit Timah GRC: Christopher de Souza; Sim Ann; Jurong East–Bukit Batok GRC: Rahayu Mahzam; Tanjong Pagar GRC: Chan Chun Sing

Area
  - Total: 17.51 km^{2} (6.76 sq mi)

Population (2026)
  - Total: 86,720
  - Density: 4,953/km^{2} (12,830/sq mi)

Ethnic groups
  - Chinese: 67,400
  - Malays: 640
  - Indians: 3,840
  - Others: 5,980
- Postal districts: 10, 11, 21
- Dwelling units: 2,423

Bukit Timah (IPA: /ˈbʊkɪt ˌtiːmɑː/ BUUK-it TEE-mah), often abbreviated as Bt Timah, is a planning area and residential estate located in the westernmost part of the Central Region of Singapore. Bukit Timah lies roughly 10 kilometres (6.2 mi) from the Central Business District, bordering the Central Water Catchment to the north, Bukit Panjang to the northwest, Queenstown to the south, Tanglin to the southeast, Clementi to the southwest, Novena to the east and Bukit Batok to the west. It is further split into eight subzones, namely Anak Bukit, Coronation Road, Farrer Court, Hillcrest, Holland Road, Leedon Park, Swiss Club and Ulu Pandan.

Owing to its prime location, Bukit Timah has one of the densest clusters of luxury condominiums and landed property in Singapore, with little public housing.

== Etymology ==
The last identification of the area was on the 1828 map by Frankin and Jackson and was noted as Bukit Timah. As the interior of Singapore was not fully explored, it is likely the name came from the Malays.

In Malay, Bukit Timah meant Tin bearing hill. The original Malay name was Bukit Temak, meaning "hill of the temak trees" as the temak trees were abundant in the area. It was possible that the British in Singapore mispronounced or misheard the name as Bukit Timah.

== History ==
Bukit Timah Road was completed in 1843 to provide a link to the highest point of Singapore, the Bukit Timah Hill. The road was then extended northwards to Kranji in 1845, making it one of the earliest roads connecting the north to the south.

The Bukit Timah railway station (BRTS) was one of the five Singapore-Kranji railway stations opened in 1905, the first railway of Singapore. BRTS was decommissioned in July 2011 together with Tanjong Pagar railway station. Sections of the former railway station have been repurposed as a community space, and is now part of the Rail Corridor.

Bukit Timah was a major battleground during the final stages of the Japanese Invasion in 1942, where the Battle of Bukit Timah was fought. The battle resulted in the fall of Bukit Timah to the Japanese as British had failed to repel the invaders from the area.

Beauty World was formerly named Tai Tong Ah Sai Kai which was founded as an amusement park during the Japanese Occupation. Following the end of occupation, Tai Tong Ah Sai Kai was renamed Beauty World in 1947 and reopened as a market. After being badly damaged by series of fires in the 1970s, Beauty World was acquired by the government and was redeveloped as a shopping centre, which opened in 1984.

== Religion ==
44% Christians, 28% None, 17% Buddhists, 3% Hindus, 1% Muslims

== Infrastructure ==
The Bukit Timah area is a particularly prominent location with high land value.

The Bukit Timah Race Course, a thoroughbred horse racing facility, was opened in 1933 and operated until 1999. The land has since been renovated, and is currently home to The Grandstand, which hosts several food outlets, childcare services and a Giant supermarket.

The nearby area hosts many bungalows, typically expensive in land-scarce Singapore, as well as high rise condominiums. Many expatriates and well-heeled Singaporeans live in this region. Its main attractions include popular eateries at Sixth Avenue, as well as Turf City.

This region was later extended and Upper Bukit Timah (District 21) was formed.

=== Mass Rapid Transit ===
There are 7 MRT stations within the planning area, spanning 2 lines, the Downtown Line and Circle Line, namely:

- DT5 Beauty World
- DT6 King Albert Park
- DT7 Sixth Avenue
- DT8 Tan Kah Kee
- CC19 DT9 Botanic Gardens
- CC20 Farrer Road
- CC21 Holland Village

Stage 2 of the Downtown MRT line train service started on 27 December 2015 and parallels the Bukit Timah Road. It connects Bukit Panjang in the North-Western edge of Bukit Timah to the city centre in the South. Both lines have an interchange station at Botanic Gardens MRT station.

Rail expansion is ongoing in Bukit Timah, with three new MRT stations slated to open in 2032 as part of the Cross Island MRT line. The upcoming MRT stations are:

- CR14 Turf City
- CR15 King Albert Park
- CR16 Maju

== Politics ==
Bukit Timah was consolidated into four constituencies, all being Group Representation Constituencies and managed by the People's Action Party, as of the 2025 election. The namesake division of Bukit Timah was one of the oldest-surviving constituencies that appeared in the map which was created in 1951; as of today, the namesake division now falls under the Holland-Bukit Timah GRC, which also include Ulu Pandan and Coronation Road. Three other GRCs also covered Bukit Timah, with the western portions and Anak Bukit belonging to Jurong East-Bukit Batok GRC, the northern portions and some of Hillcrest and Swiss Club subdivisions belonging to Bishan-Toa Payoh GRC, and eastern portions including the subdivisions of Holland Village and Leedon Park belonging to Tanjong Pagar GRC.

== Education ==
Bukit Timah is known to having many international schools in the region, due to the high number of expatriates and immigrants living in this region.

=== Primary schools ===
- Bukit Timah Primary School
- Henry Park Primary School
- Methodist Girls' School (Primary)
- Anglo-Chinese School (Primary)
- Nanyang Primary School
- Pei Hwa Presbyterian Primary School
- Raffles Girls' Primary School

=== Secondary schools ===
- Anglo-Chinese School (Barker Road)
- St Joseph's Institution
- Singapore Chinese Girls School*
- Hwa Chong Institution
- Methodist Girls' School (Secondary)
- Nanyang Girls' High School
- National Junior College
- St. Margaret's Secondary School

=== Tertiary institutions ===
- Hwa Chong Institution
- National Junior College
- St Joseph's Institution
- Ngee Ann Polytechnic
- Singapore Institute of Management
- Singapore University of Social Sciences

=== Other schools ===
- Chatsworth International School
- DIMENSIONS International College (Bukit Timah Campus)
- Holland International School
- Hwa Chong International School
- St Francis Methodist School
- Singapore Korean International School
- Swiss School in Singapore

== Notable locations ==
- Lana Cake Shop, cake shop

== See also ==
- Bukit Timah Expressway
- Bukit Timah Monkey Man – cryptid said to be living in the Bukit Timah forest
- Bukit Timah Nature Reserve
- Bukit Timah Satellite Earth Station

== Sources ==
- National Heritage Board (2002), Singapore's 100 Historic Places, Archipelago Press, ISBN 981-4068-23-3
