= Holland Village MRT station =

Mass Rapid Transit station in Singapore

Holland Village CC21 荷兰村 ஹாலந்து வில்லேஜ்
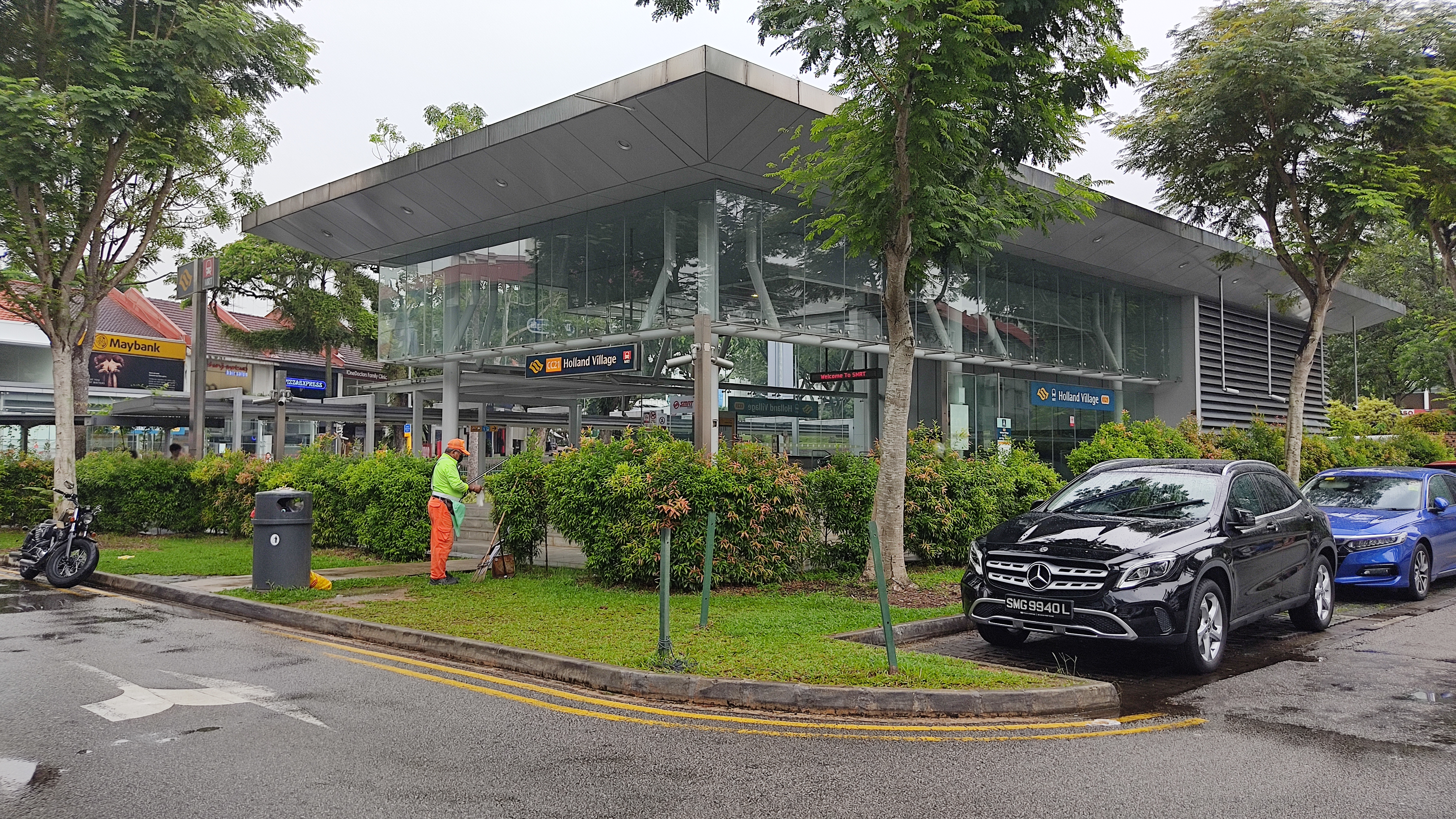
- Exit A of the station

General information
- Location: 200 Holland Avenue, Singapore 278995
- Coordinates: 01°18′43″N 103°47′46″E
- System: Mass Rapid Transit (MRT) station
- Owner: Land Transport Authority
- Operator: SMRT Trains
- Line: Circle Line
- Platforms: 2 (1 island platform)
- Tracks: 2
- Connections: Bus, Taxi

Construction
- Structure type: Underground
- Platform levels: 1
- Accessible: Yes

Other information
- Station code: HLV

History
- Opened: 8 October 2011; 15 years ago
- Former names: Holland, Chip Bee

Passengers
- June 2024: 8,688 per day

Services
Preceding station	Mass Rapid Transit	Following station
Farrer Road Clockwise	Circle Line	Buona Vista Anticlockwise
Farrer Road towards Dhoby Ghaut	Circle Line	Buona Vista towards Prince Edward Road
Track layout
Location
- Location within Singapore Rail central area

Holland Village MRT station is an underground Mass Rapid Transit (MRT) station on the Circle Line (CCL), located along the boundary of Bukit Timah and Queenstown planning areas in Singapore. Situated close to the junction of Holland Avenue and Holland Road, it primarily serves the area of Holland Village, where its name was derived from. The station is operated by SMRT Trains.

First announced as Holland MRT station in 2003, the station was renamed Holland Village through a public poll in 2005. The station opened on 8 October 2011 when Stages 4 and 5 of the CCL stations opened. The station features Holland Beat by Jeremy Sharma as part of the MRT network's Art-in-Transit programme.

== History ==
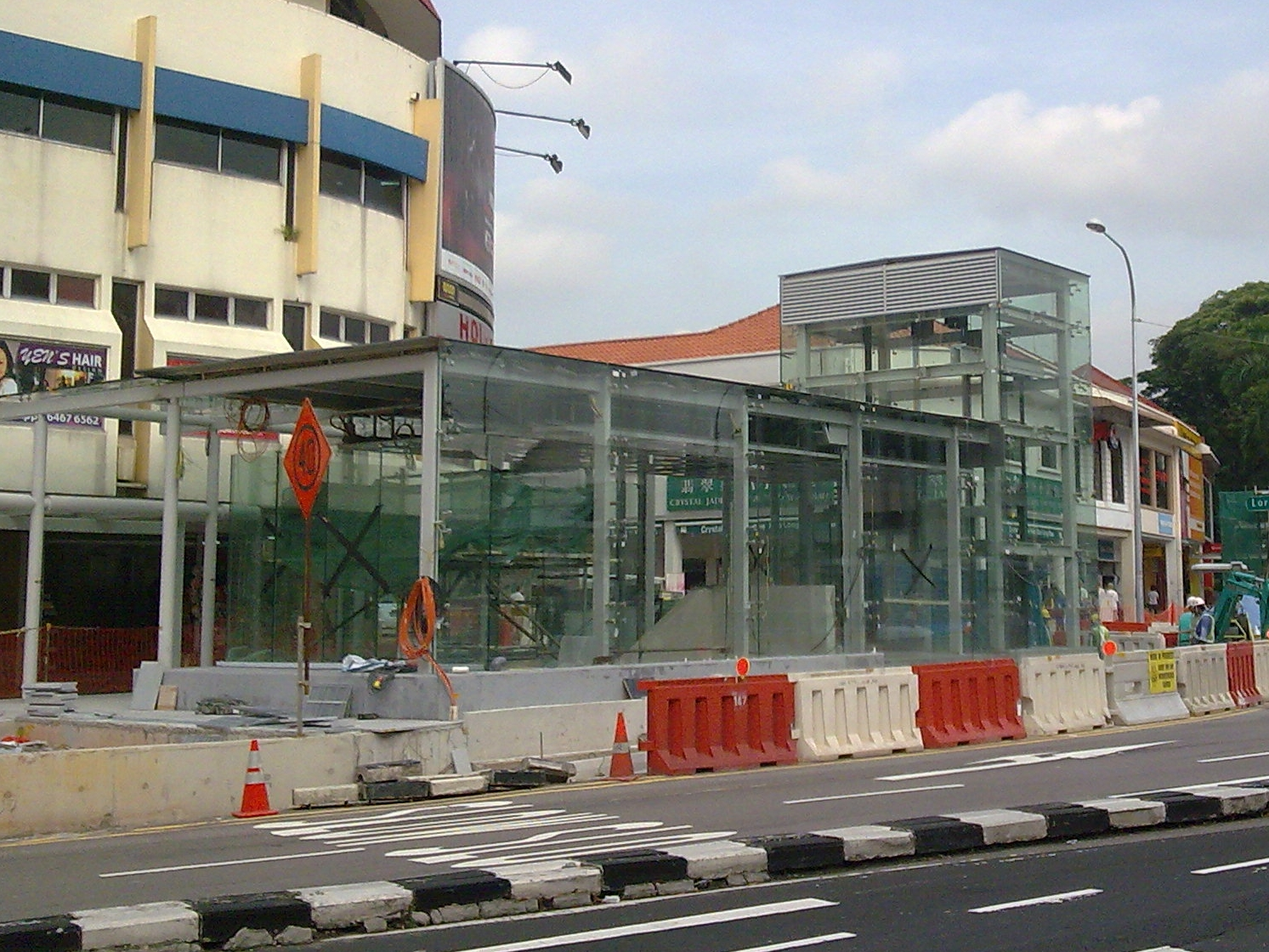
The entrance to the station under construction

The station was first announced as Holland station when the Circle Line (CCL) Stages 4 and 5 stations were revealed in 2003. The contract for the construction of Holland station was awarded to Woh Hup (Pte) Ltd–Shanghai Tunnel Engineering Co. Ltd–Alpine Mayreder bau GmbH (WH-STEC-AM) Joint Venture at a contract value of S$399.91 million (US$236.6 million) in 2004. The construction of the 8.25-kilometre (5.13-mile) bored tunnels required the use of 6.35-metre (20.8 ft) diameter Earth pressure balance (EPB) machines. In 2005, the station name was finalised as Holland Village.

Careful excavation was needed during the station construction, due to the close proximity of residential properties around the station. The construction walls were closely monitored to detect any deflection and soil settlement. Residents and shophouses were also kept informed during the station's construction. The station opened on 8 October 2011 as part of the CCL extension to HarbourFront station.

On 29 July 2018, as part of a joint emergency preparedness exercise by the Land Transport Authority (LTA) and train operator SMRT, security screenings were conducted at the station. This is the second emergency preparedness exercise conducted at a public transport node in 2018, after Newton station. Such exercises were to test established response protocols and maintain vigilance for quicker and effective responses in the case of an incident.

== Station details ==
=== Name and location ===
Holland Village station is named after the nearby Holland Road, which in turn it was named after an early resident, Hugh Holland, a well-respected architect. During a naming poll by the Land Transport Authority (LTA), "Holland Village" garnered the most votes with 87.1%, compared to the alternative proposed name "Chip Bee" at 7.1%.

The station is located underneath Holland Road, with its entrances situated along Holland Avenue. The station serves Holland Village and nearby landmarks such as the Holland Village Market and Food Centre, Anglo-Chinese School (International), Masjid Kampong Holland and the Vietnamese Embassy.

=== Services ===
The station serves the Circle Line (CCL) and is situated between the Farrer Road and Buona Vista stations. The station code is CC21 on official maps. The station operates daily between 5:37 am and 12:21 am. Train frequencies vary from 2 to 5 minutes depending on peak hours.

=== Design ===
Designed by SAA Architects, Holland Village station adopts a minimalist concept using several pre-fabricated constituents. The entrance, intended to be distinguishable in the streetscape, employs a lightweight structure with glass materials on its exterior to allow the visibility of the shophouses at the ground level.

Within the station's interior, there are retail shops at the concourse level as part of the SMRT Shop & Dine Concept, to provide a retail experience for commuters. The station has a simple layout to facilitate ease of movement, fulfilling the operational criteria for the station. The artwork and the distinguishing features of the station help foster an identity for Holland Village station.

=== Station artwork ===
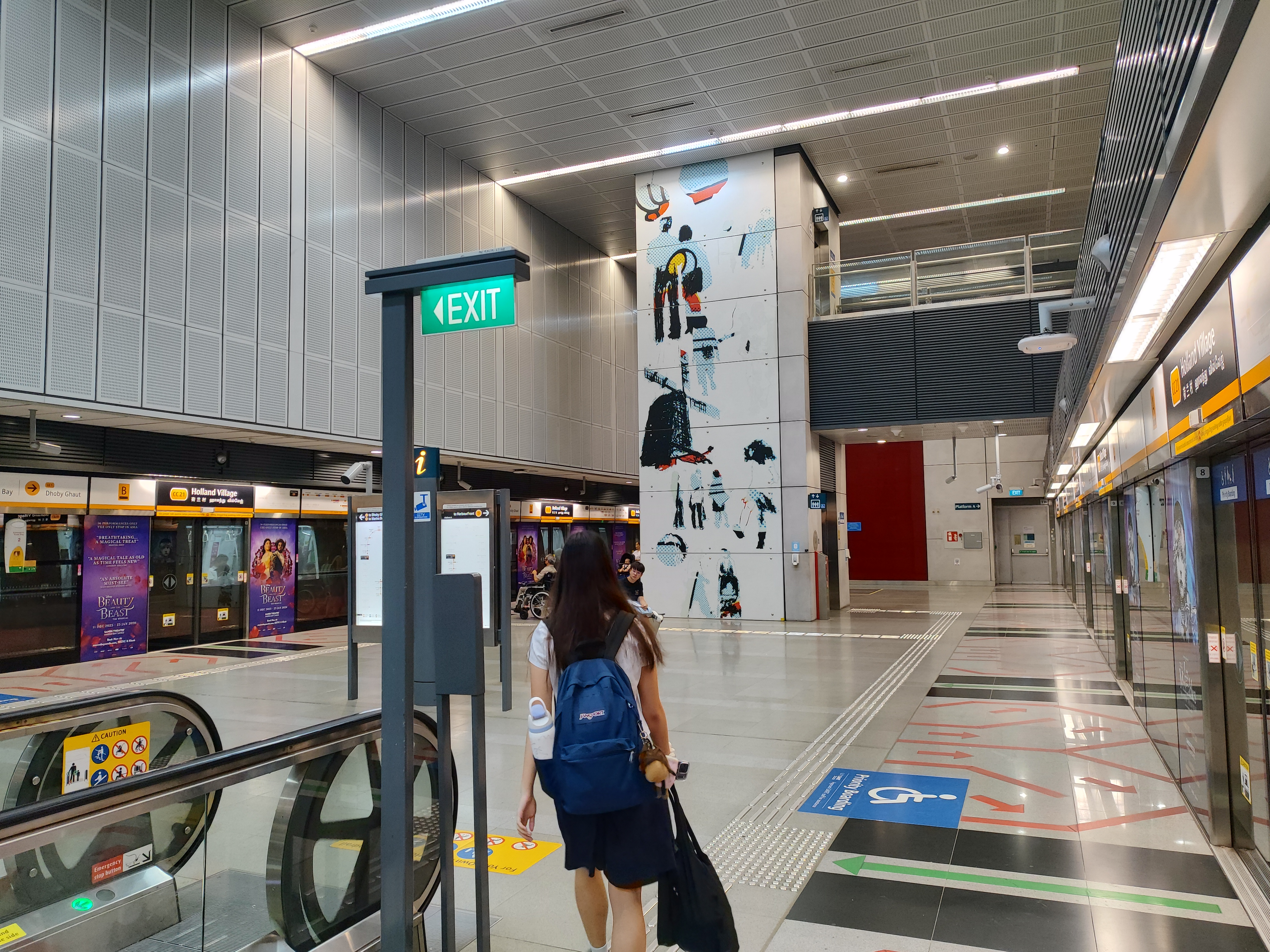
Platform level of the station with Art-in-Transit artwork on the lift shaft

Commissioned as part of the MRT network's Art-in-Transit Programme, (Note: Public art showcase which integrates artworks into the MRT network) Holland Beat by Jeremy Sharma is displayed on the lift shaft of the station. The artwork depicts drawings and images of Holland Village in a style reminiscent of American pop art. The title of the artwork "Holland Beat", as the artist explained, refers to the "tempo and rhythm" of the neighbourhood.

Seeking inspiration for his work, the artist spent an afternoon at Holland Village, capturing images that caught his attention. These pictures were then turned into drawings, generating up to 50 sketches of Holland Village's objects, scenes, signs and architectural features. Using digital means, these images were combined into a collage, superposed on an image of an airline safety card, which design and colours the artist was fascinated by. This produced a set of drawings in a style similar to Roy Lichtenstein, an American pop artist. Adding texture and intrigue to the artworks, some of the pencil markings were removed, creating vibrant everyday scenes "injecting street life" to the otherwise "dull" station design.

Using a vertical canvas, Sharma eventually chose eight drawings which were then arranged in a non-linear fashion, leaving enough negative space to avoid the work "resembling a newspaper". When the drawings were scanned and expanded on the larger 8.8-metre (29 ft) by 2.8-metre (9.2 ft) canvas, the images came out pixellated since the drawings were initially small. Using digital software, the artist then converted the drawings into a mosaic made up of distinct colour blobs. This resulted in the work resembling an impressionist painting made up of very visible brush strokes, allowing the work to be viewed from afar and its details appreciated up close. When shown the two versions (the colour blobs vs the pixellated version), the LTA architects and the artist agreed on the former as they felt this had a "much strong concept". This work reflects the artist's artistic vision of works that "blur the sources" the painting was derived from, with the integration of elements from paintings, digital drawing and photography, which also reflects the artists' career. The title was also seen as a reference to Sharma's background as a former guitarist and songwriter.

== Notes and references ==
=== Works cited ===
- Zhuang, Justin (2013). Art in transit: Circle Line MRT - Singapore. Singapore: Land Transport Authority. ISBN 978-981-07-4982-8. OCLC 854958677.
