= Swiss School in Singapore =

- Schweizer Schule in Singapur

Location
- 38 Swiss Club Road; Singapore 288140; 1.3431304°N 103.79085280000004°E

Information
- Type: Private
- Established: 1967; 59 years ago
- Website: https://www.swiss-school.edu.sg/en/

Swiss School in Singapore (SSiS; German: Schweizer Schule in Singapur) is a Swiss international school in Bukit Timah, Singapore.

== History ==
The Swiss School in Singapore was founded in 1967 and officially opened on May 2, 1967. Marie-Therese and Werner Kaufmann-Sialm were the first two teachers sent from Switzerland to educate 18 children in Kindergarten and ten students in primary classes. On July 18, 1967, the "Swiss School Association" was registered as a company without share capital.

== Alumni ==
The Swiss School Alumni Association was established on April 7, 2015, and is domiciled in Zug, Switzerland. The association's aim is to foster contact among former students, parents, employees and friends of SSiS beyond their time at SSiS.
