= Holland Road, Singapore =

Holland Road
- Subzone of Bukit Timah Planning Area

Name transcription(s)
  - Chinese: 荷兰路
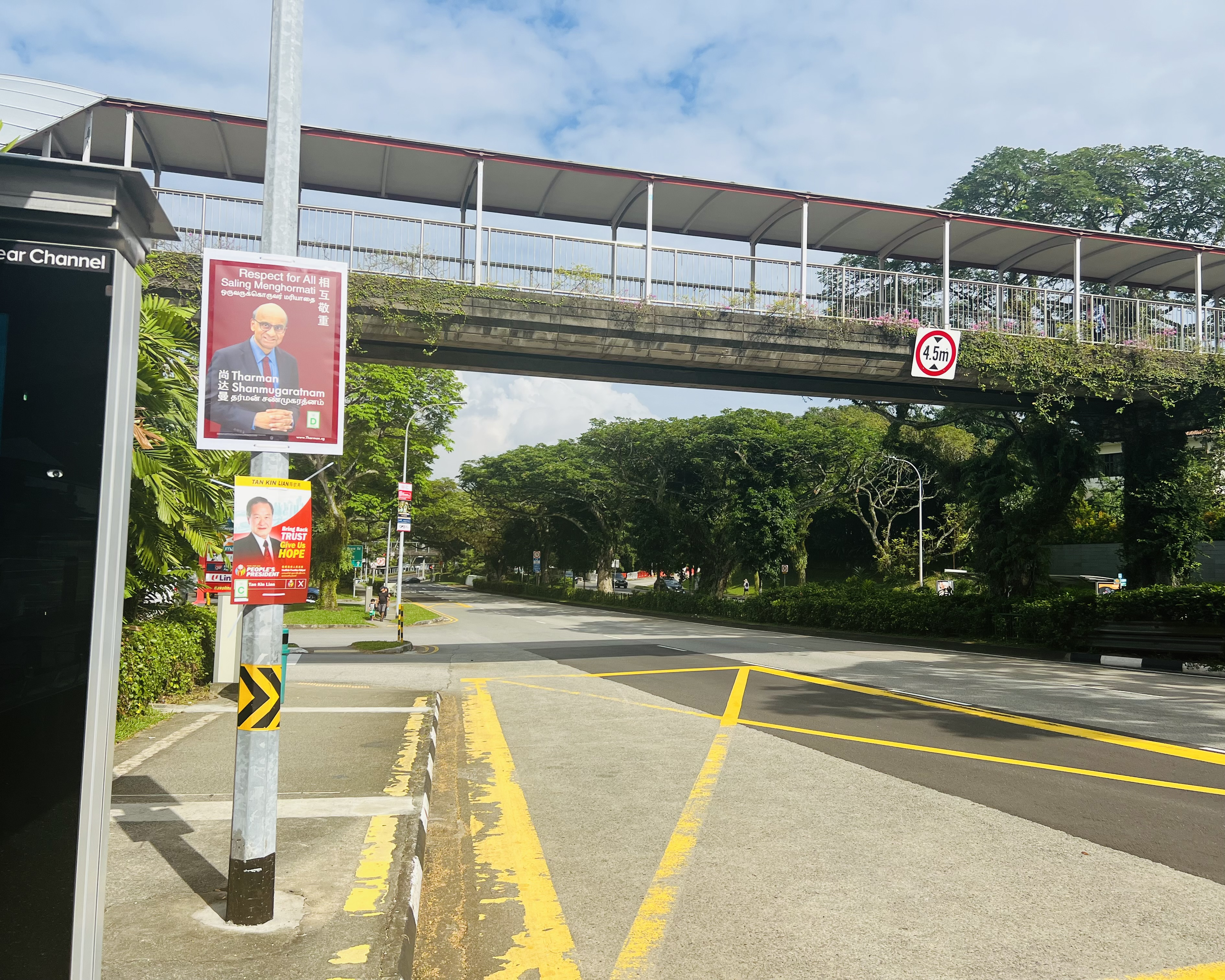
- Holland Road westbound to Clementi
- Country: Singapore
- Planning area: Bukit Timah Planning Area

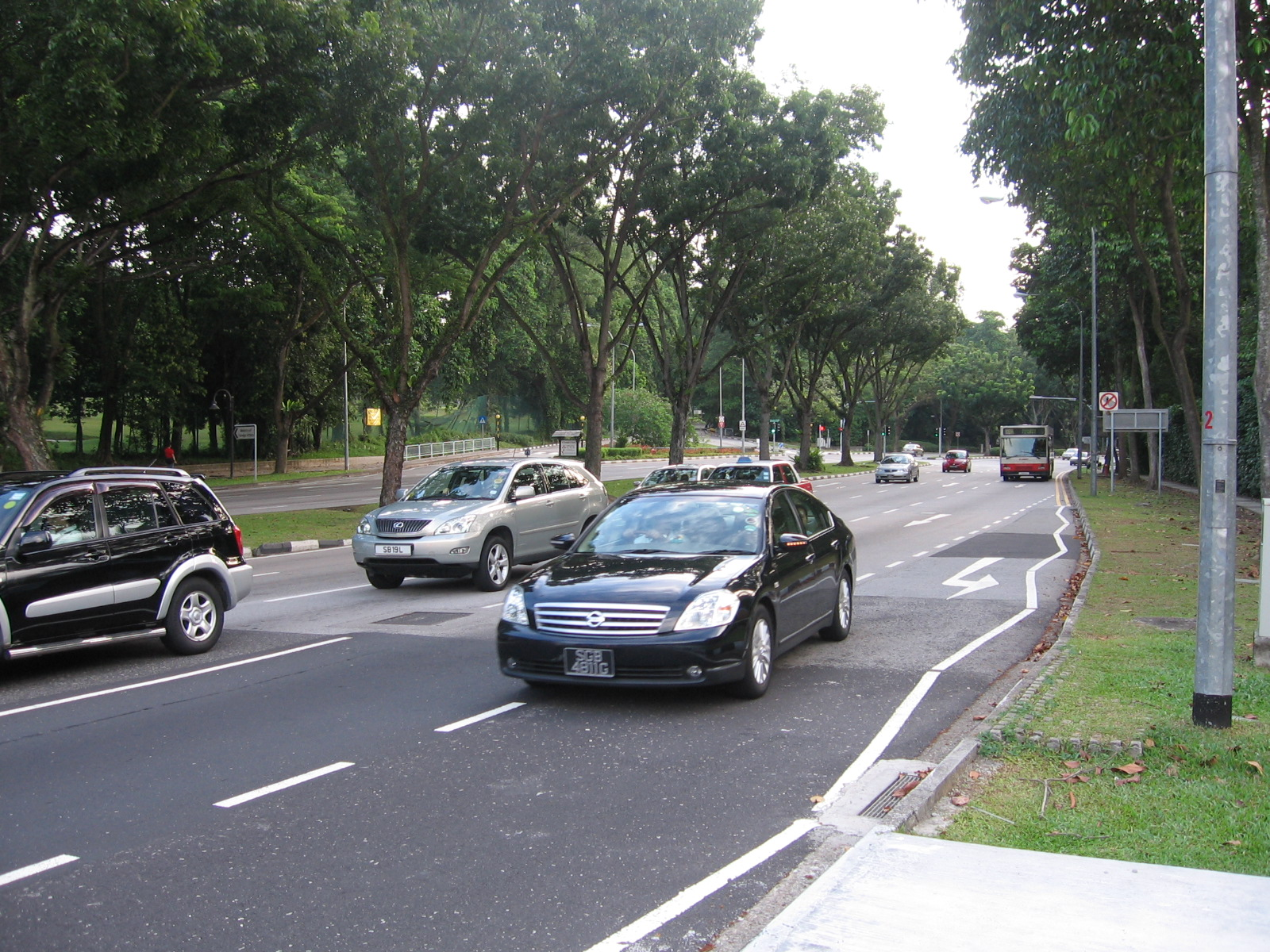
Holland Road eastbound, near the Tanglin entrance of the Singapore Botanic Gardens

Holland Road (Chinese: 荷兰路) is a subzone of the Bukit Timah planning area named after the major road of the same name in Bukit Timah, Singapore.

Holland Road is located between the borders of Clementi, Holland Village, a neighborhood along the Queenstown–Bukit Timah boundary which is popular for its restaurants, cafes and nightspots and is frequented by expatriates, and Dempsey Hill.

== Etymology ==
Holland Road and Holland Village were named after an early resident in Singapore, Hugh Holland, who was an architect. The roads Holland Avenue, Holland Close and Holland Drive were named as such in 1972. Holland Road is known as hue hng au in Hokkien, meaning "behind the flower garden". The "flower garden" refers to the Botanic Gardens.
