= Lana Cake Shop =

Singapore Cake Shop

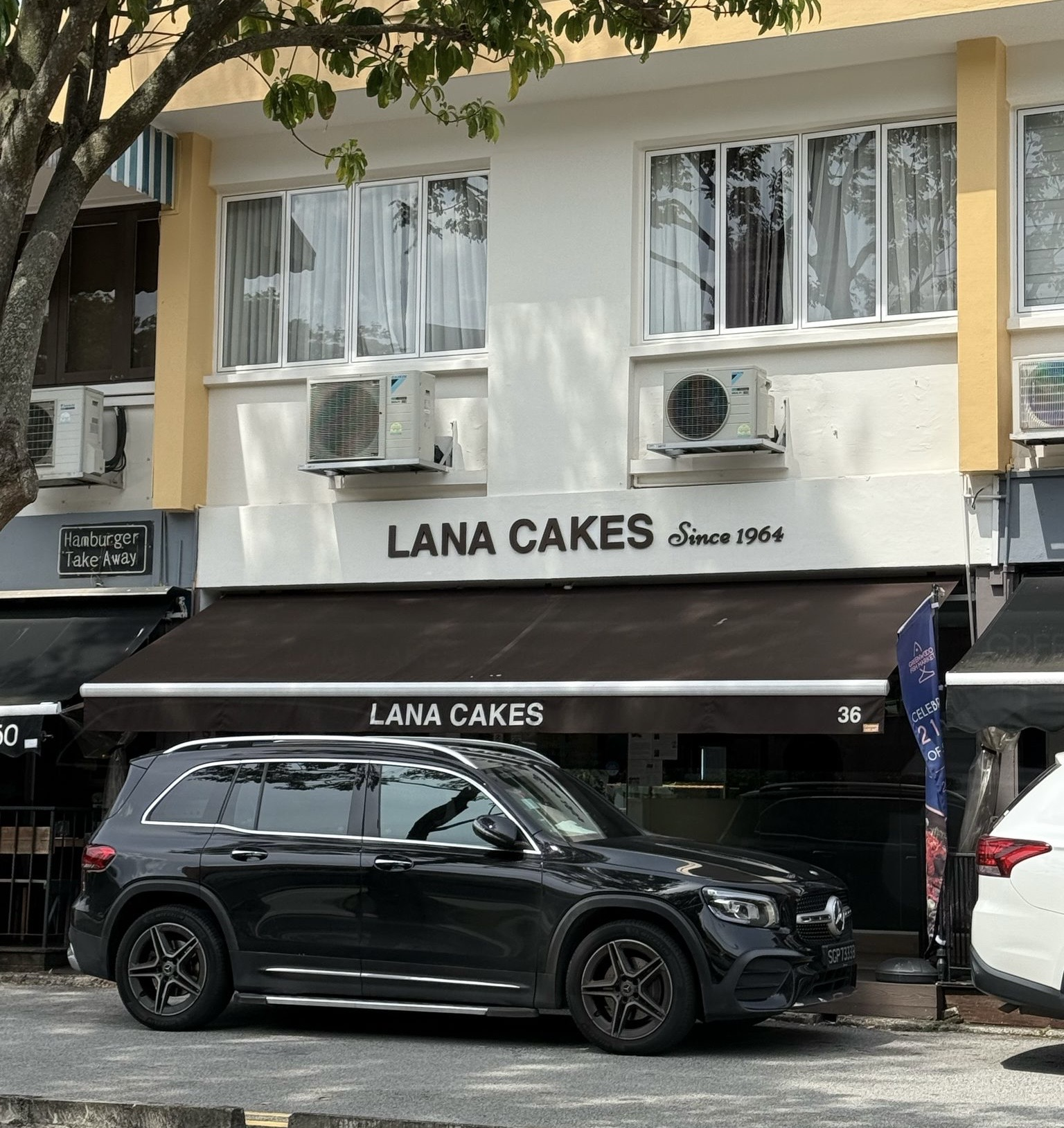
- Lana Cake Shop in 2025
- Interactive map of Lana Cake Shop

Restaurant information
- Established: 1975; 51 years ago
- Owner: Jason Kwan
- Location: 36 Greenwood Avenue, 289239, Singapore
- Coordinates: 1.331844°N 103.806457°E
- Website: https://www.lanacakes-since1964.com/

Lana Cake Shop, also known as Lana Cakes, is a cake shop on Greenwood Avenue in Singapore. The shop sells various cakes, but is most known for selling fudge cakes.

== History ==
The shop was opened in 1975 by Violet Kwan, who had begun selling cakes from her home in 1964. Kwan learned the cake's recipe from her sister-in-law, Lani. The shop is named after Lani. Kwan put the shop up for sale in 2016 as she wanted to retire. By September, she had received numerous offers, but she had not accepted any, as she believed that she had not yet found a good match. However, instead of selling the shop, Kwan decided to pass ownership to her son, Jason Kwan, who was previously a banker working in Tokyo, and reopened the shop in March 2019.

== Reception ==
Tan Hsueh Yun of The Straits Times ranked the store as having the best chocolate fudge cakes among the top 10 fudge cakes in Singapore in 2016, giving it a score of 16.7 out of 25. Delfina Utomo of Time Out included the shop in her 2019 list of the 8 best traditional bakeries and cake shops in Singapore. Dolly Dai and Ho Guo Xiong included the shop in their 2021 list of where to get the best and most indulgent chocolate cakes in Singapore.
