= Meyer Road =

Road in Katong, Singapore

- Little India of East Coast
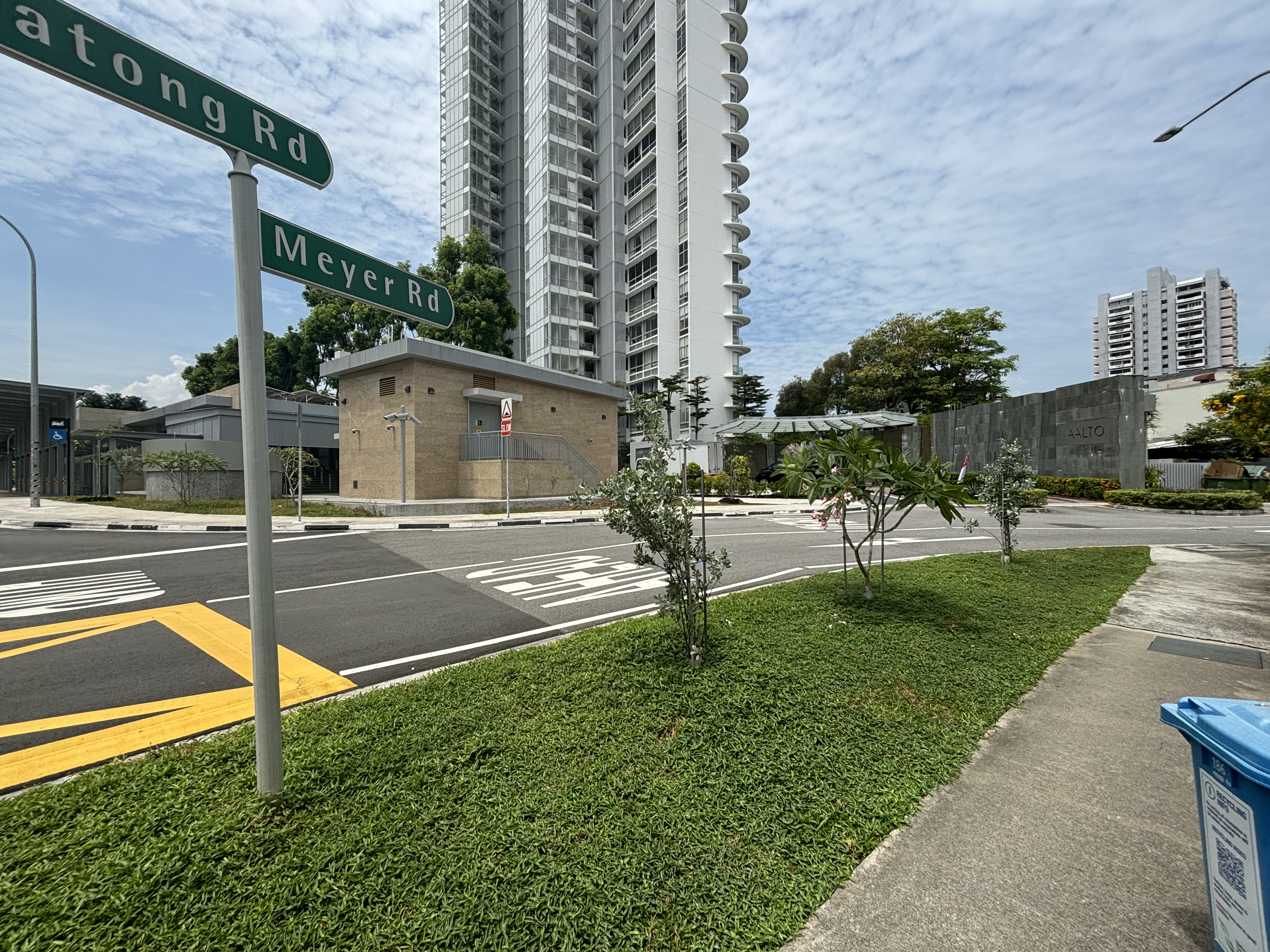
- The end of Meyer Road (junction between Meyer Road and Tanjong Katong Road)
- Interactive map of Meyer Road
- Namesake: Manasseh Meyer
- Type: Primary access
- Owner: Land Transport Authority (LTA)
- Maintained by: LTA
- Length: 1.4 km (0.87 mi)
- Nearest Mass Rapid Transit station: Katong Park MRT station and Tanjong Katong MRT station
- Coordinates: 1°17′50″N 103°53′29″E
- From: Tanjong Rhu Road
- To: Tanjong Katong Road

Other
- Known for: Katong Park, Katong Park Hotel, and Crescent and Mayer Flats

Meyer Road is a primary access street in Katong, Singapore. Named in 1921 after Sir Manasseh Meyer, it stretches from Tanjong Rhu Road to Tanjong Katong Road at a length of 1.4km. It is connected to many prominent past and present landmarks such as Katong Park (and by extension, Fort Tanjong Katong) and formerly the Crescent Flats and Meyer Flats (thought to be Singapore's first luxurious beach-front condominiums) as well as Katong Park Hotel (Malaya's biggest hotel since World War 2). It is nicknamed "the Little India of East Coast" due to the large number of Indian residents living there.

== History ==
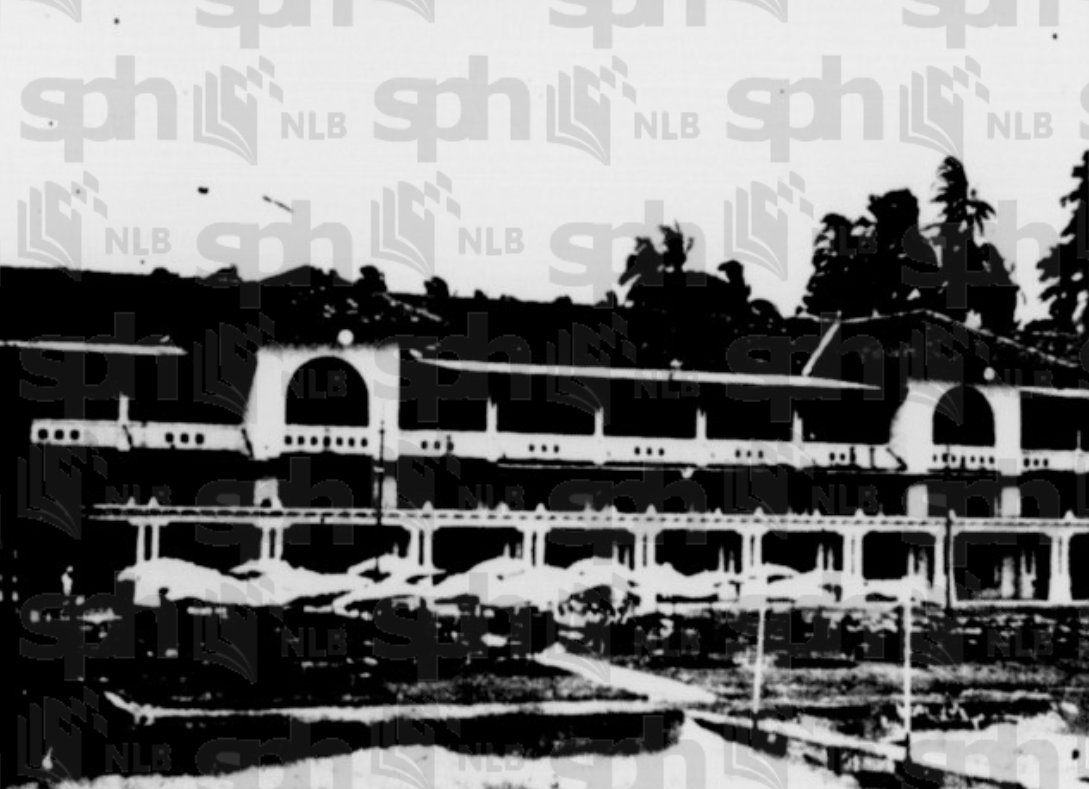
Sea View Hotel in 1928, shortly after it was rebuilt

The road was named after Sir Manasseh Meyer, a Jewish businessman known for his extensive philanthropic efforts such as donating to those in or out of the Jewish community as well as establishing Singapore's only synagogues: the Chesed-El Synagogue and the Maghain Aboth Synagogue. Ostensibly, the road was named by Sir Meyer himself since he owned the old Sea View Hotel and the Adelphi Hotel, the former of which was located at present-day Meyer Road. However, the name of the road was established in 1921 as a part of a street-naming exercise to simplify the house numbering system in Katong. Prior to land reclamation works in the area, the road "enjoyed an enviable seafront." Sharon Lim Weekend East reported in March 1993 that penthouses in eastern parts of Singapore, "especially those in the Meyer Road area", had "soared in value."

It is thought that the earliest beach-front, luxurious condominiums built in Singapore were located on Meyer Road: the Crescent Flats in 1909 and the Meyer Flats in 1928 (both built by Sir Meyer). The crescent curves for both buildings were inspired by the design of terrace houses in Bath, United Kingdom. Both were demolished in the early 1990s.

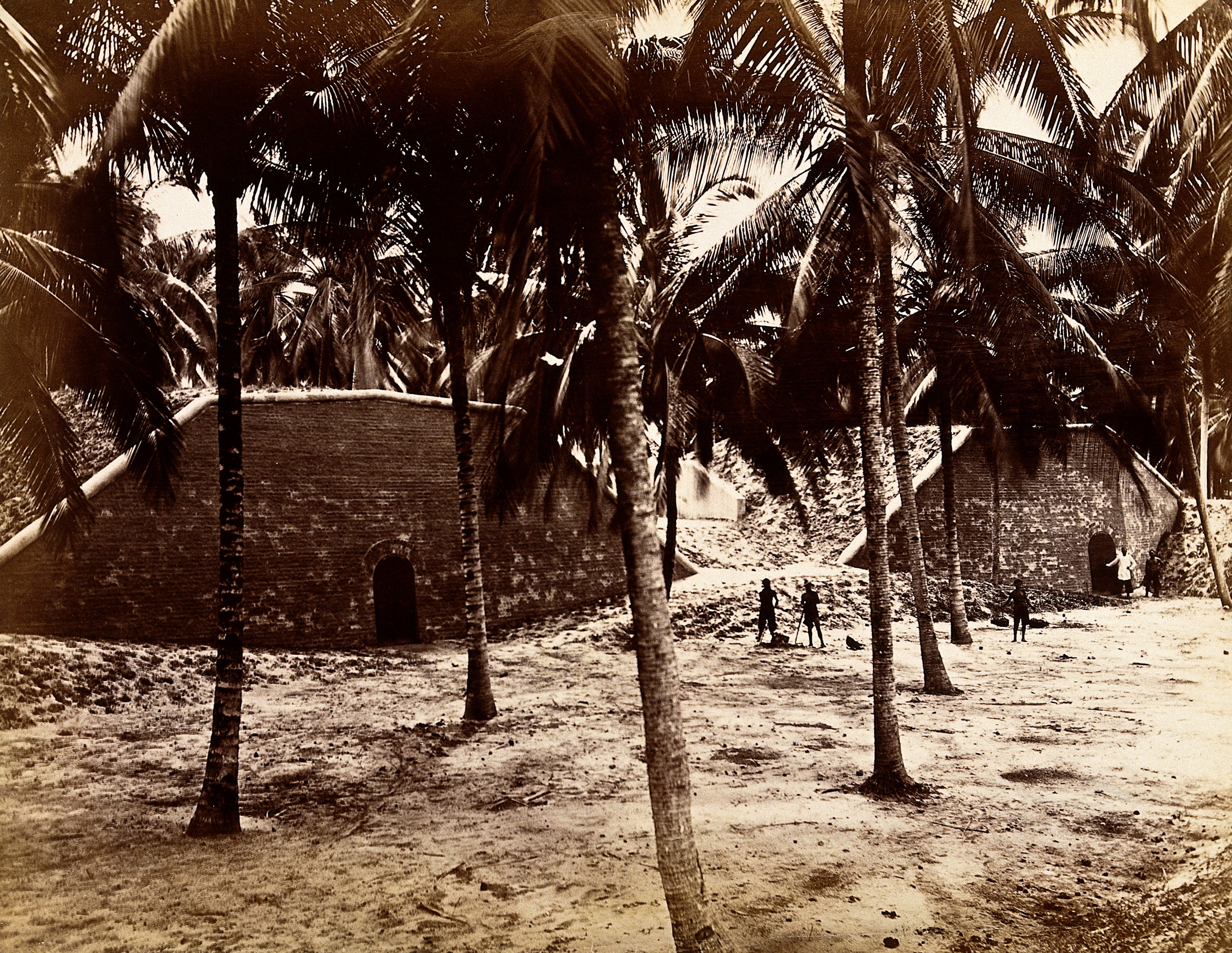
Fort Tanjong Katong in 1880

Arguably, one of the most famous landmarks connecting to Meyer Road is Katong Park. Katong Park was initially built by the British in 1879 as a coastal fortress to defend against sea attacks. However, in 1901, it was abandoned and buried. Subsequently, Katong Park was built over the buried fort and was opened on 19 December 1931. Between September and October 1963, a total of three bombs exploded in Katong Park as a part of the Konfrontasi. Apart from there being no casualties, the bombs did damage nearby cars and the windows of the Ambassador Hotel (better known as Katong Park Hotel) on the opposite side of the park. The park remained popular until the 1960s, when reclamation works in the area shifted the shore away from the park, which lost it seafront. The extension of Fort Road also led to much of the park being demolished.

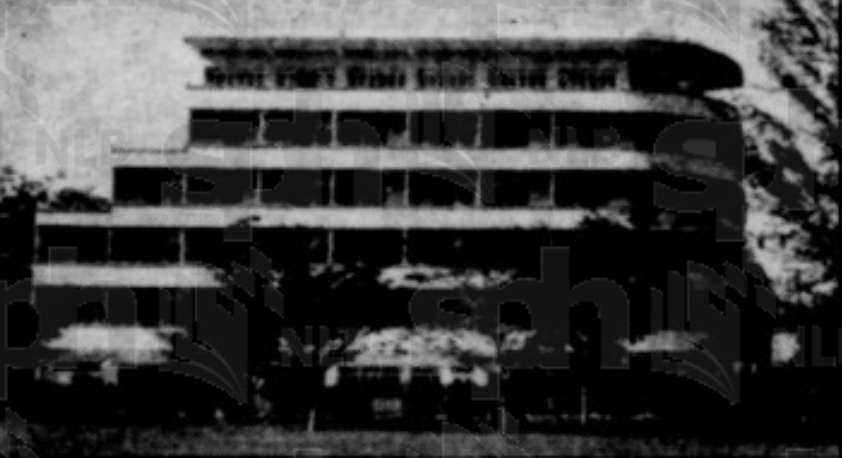
The Embassy Hotel in March 1953, a month before its opening

Another famous landmark that was in Meyer Road was the Katong Park Hotel (formerly the Embassy Hotel, Hotel Ambassador, and Duke Hotel). Opened on 26 April 1953, it was operated as the Embassy Hotel by the descendants and relatives of the late Lim Ah Eng. The Embassy Hotel was famed for being Malaya's biggest hotel since World War 2. It was closed in 1960 and was briefly opened, closed, and renamed a few times before being owned by the Tan family in 1994. They tried to sell it in September 1998 but they withdrew it due to selling it for a high price. However, since the Tan family failed to repay the Central Provident Fund (CPF) contributions from November 1997 to May 1998, the CPF board declared the Katong Hotel to be insolvent, therefore resulting in the closure of it. It was demolished to make way for the condominium project The View @ Meyer by GuocoLand, which was completed in 2006.

== Details ==
Meyer Road is a primary access street that stretches from Tanjong Rhu Road to Tanjong Katong Road at a length of 1.4 kilometres (0.87 mi). According to The Sunday Times, the road "offers a fairly wide mix of housing choices", with a "clear delineation" between the condominium complexes on one side of the road and the semi-detached houses on the other and offers "relative peace and [quietness]". The neighbourhood is popular with Indian expatriates due to its location near East Coast Park and the city. In fact, the surrounding area of Meyer Road is nicknamed the "Little India of the East Coast" due to a large number of North Indians living there.

=== Landmarks ===
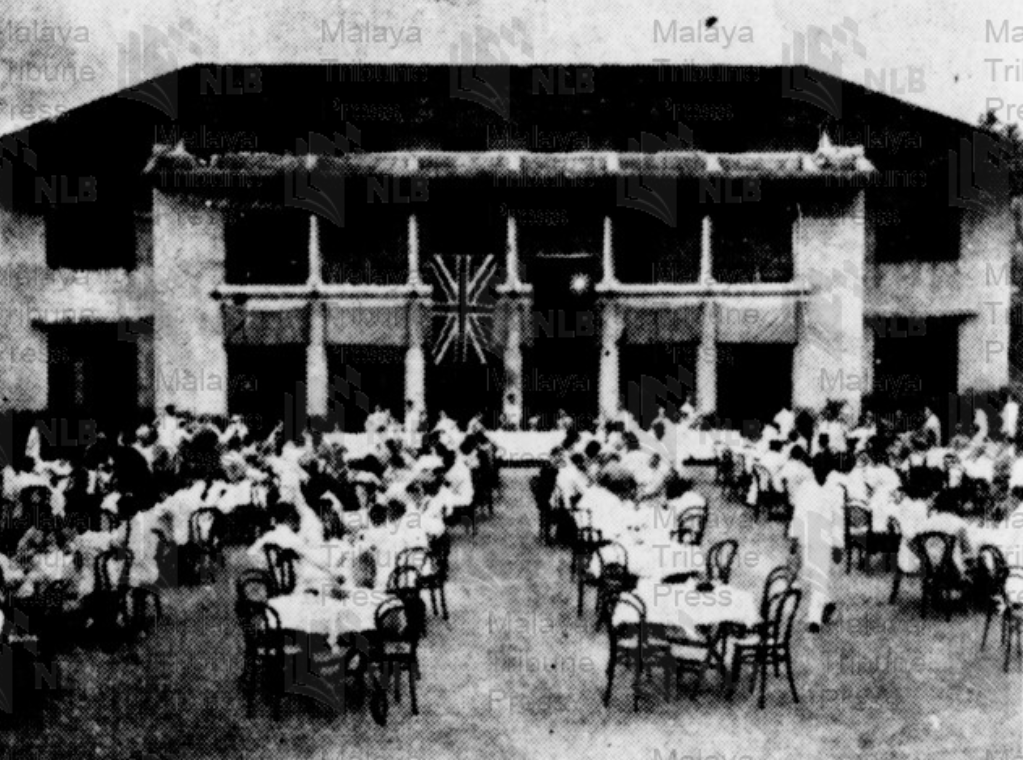
Chinese National Day at 61 Meyer Road in 1936

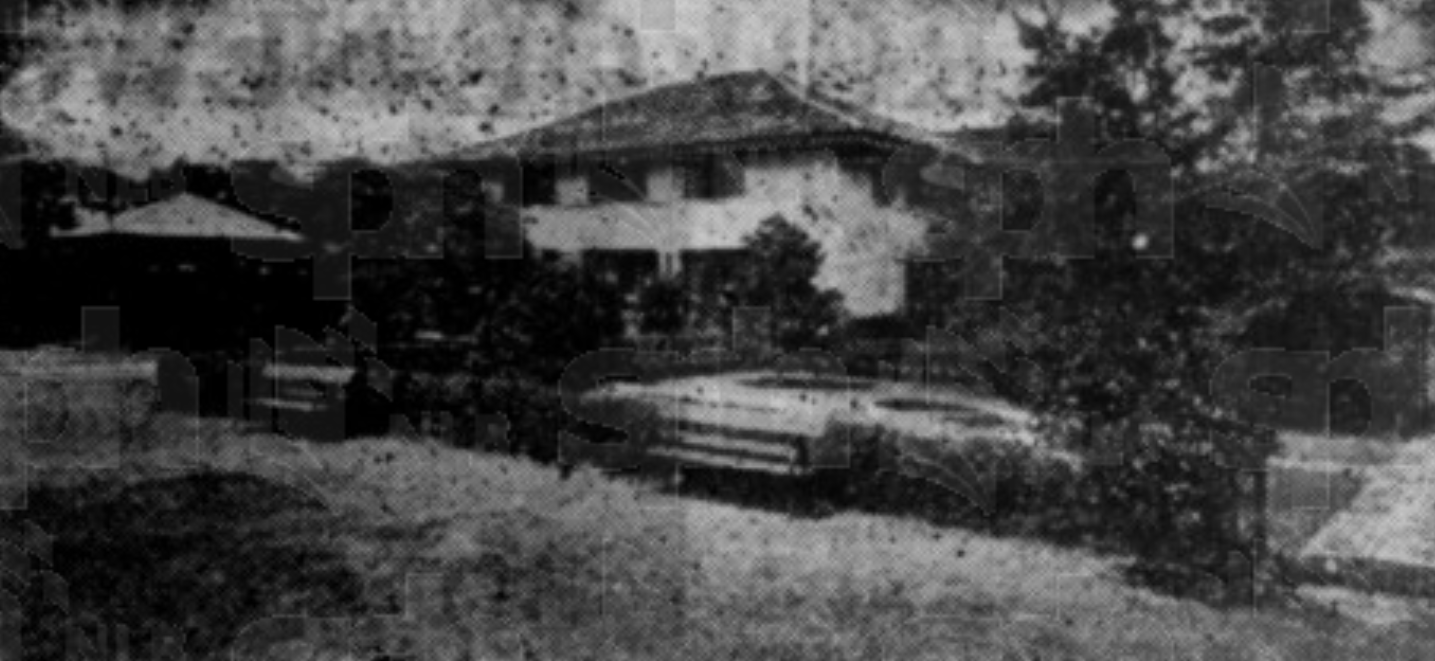
"Hollywood" in September 1934

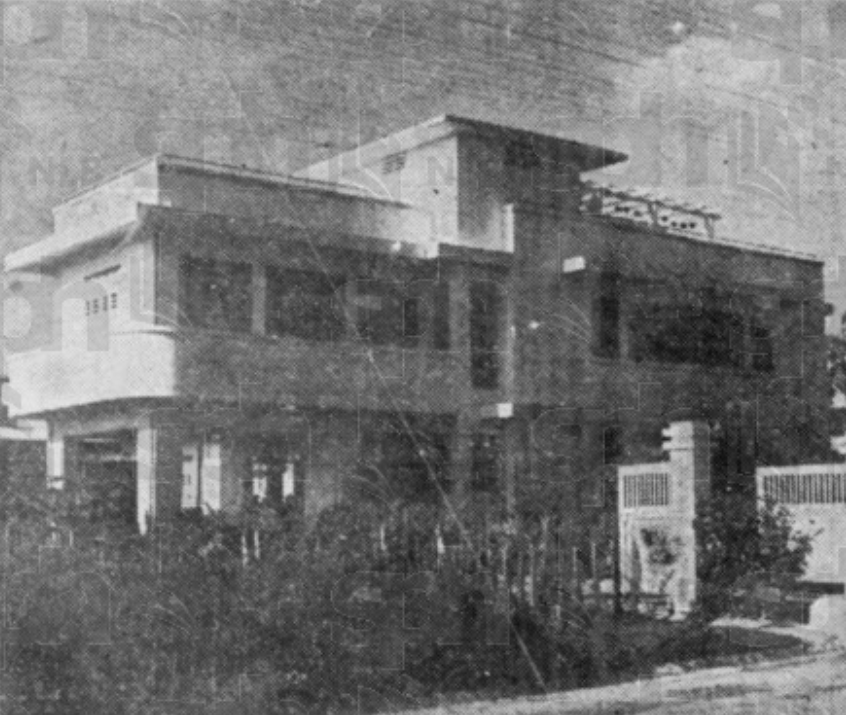
The residence of M. E. Isaac in 1938

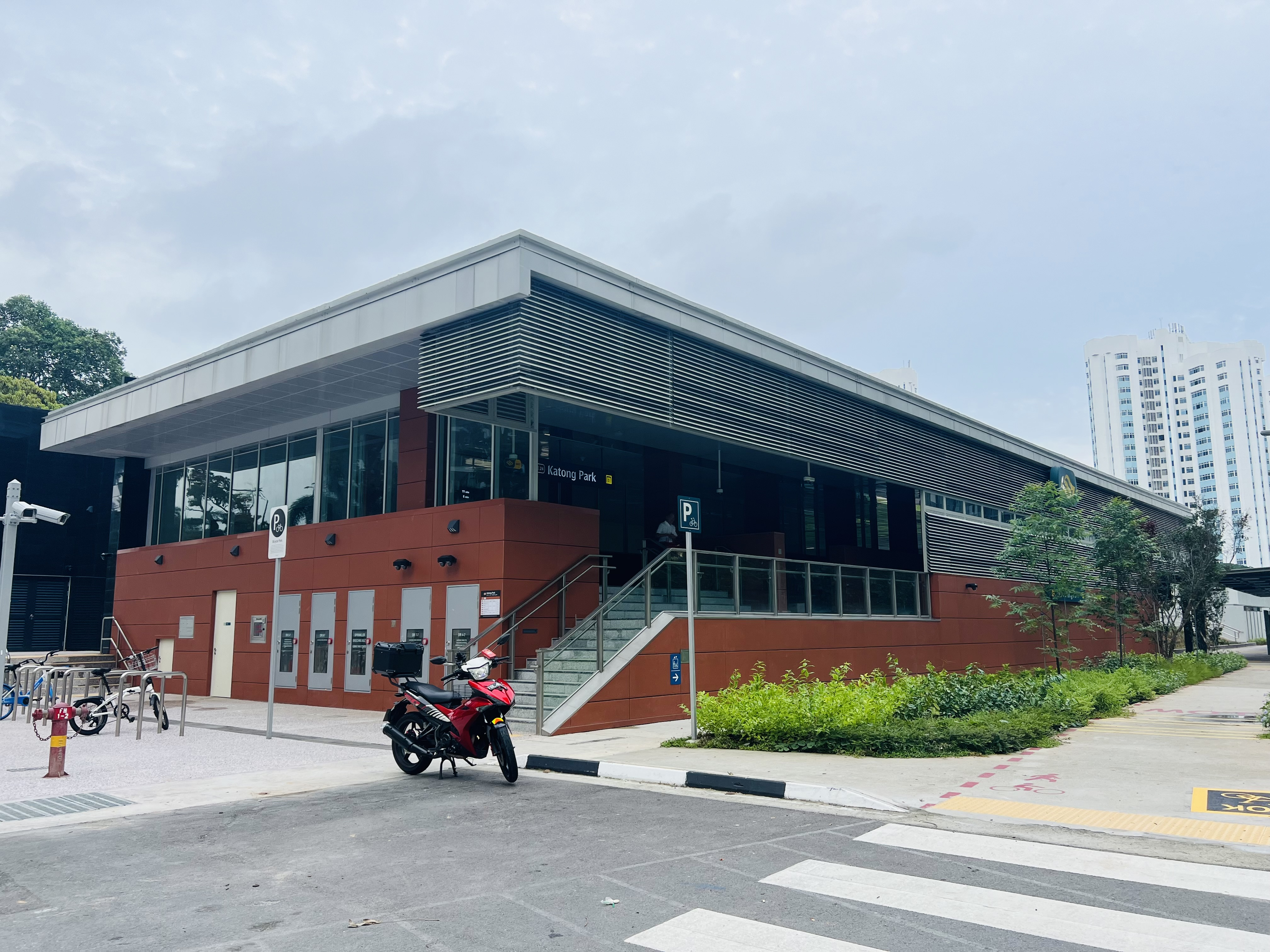
Exit 1 of Katong Park station along Meyer Road

The following is a list of landmarks that are/were in Meyer Road:

- 30 Meyer Road, a bungalow worked on by little-known British architect Eric Vernon Miller. The house was bought by Singaporean entrepreneur and philanthropist Jack Sim in the 1990s. Sim restored the building, which by then had become a "wreck".
- 58 Meyer Road, a bungalow which was rented out to Low Pui-Kim (also known as Liu Beijin), an entrepreneur of Muar, Malaysia. Liu established the film production studio of the Low Pui-Kim Nanyang Independent Film Production Company at the building in July 1926. The company produced New Friend, the first locally produced film. It was partially filmed in the bungalow, which also housed a staff dormitory and a film processing room. The studio moved to 333 Pasir Panjang Road following the film's release. However, plans for a second film never materialised.
- 61 Meyer Road, which was the residence of Parkcane C. Hwang, the founder and manager of the local branch of the Bank of China. The "huge" house was built by Manasseh Meyer, who died in 1930, shortly after it was completed. His wife, Rebecca, then rented the house to the bank.
- 87 Meyer Road, former residence of Lee Seng Gee, chairman of the Lee foundation.
- Belaria, an "E"-shaped bungalow at 165 Meyer Road. Owned by Jacob M. Meyer, the twin son of Manasseh Meyer, the house served as the holiday home of the Meyer family. A September 1934 article in The Straits Times described it as "easily the most distinguished building along Meyer Road", featuring a "lovely view of the island-studded south and east and all the variety of the international marine life of a busy Eastern port." Its garden was then "fast becoming one of the prettiest in the neighbourhood." The bungalow was also among the few houses in the Katong area with "modern sanitation" at the time.
- Crescent Flats, an apartment. It was thought to be one of Singapore's first luxury condominiums
- Eastern Mansion, a condominium. It was demolished to make way for Aalto.
- Fort Tanjong Katong (buried underneath Katong Park, part of it is displayed there)
- Hollywood, a "Californian"-style bungalow designed mostly by the wife of lawyer and historian Sir Roland Braddell with his assistance. It was built in 1928 after Braddell had heard of the site through Meyer, who was his landlord. The Straits Times reported in September 1934 that "Mrs. Braddell's sense of colour and form has blended splendidly with Mr. Braddell's strong sense of beauty; both have a flair for art and besides gathering around them the works of masters, model and paint themselves." The interior was fitted by furniture designed by Mrs. Braddell and made by the Frankel family.
- Katong Park
- Katong Park Hotel, a hotel. It was formerly known as the Embassy Hotel, Hotel Ambassador, and Duke Hotel. It is now replaced by The View @ Meyer, developed by GuocoLand.
- Katong Park MRT station, which was built under the road. Opened as part of Stage 4 of the Thomson–East Coast MRT line on 23 June 2024, the station has two exits serving the Meyer Road area.
- M. E. Isaac's residence, which was listed by The Straits Times in March 1938 as an example of "modern, flat-roofed reinforced concrete" buildings that indicated a "departure" from the "old style of domestic architecture in Malaya", along with the then-under construction bungalow of Chee Guan Chiang on Grange Road, the smaller bungalow within the same estate which served as Chee's temporary residence prior to the completion of the main building, and the residence of surveyor Langdon Williams on Golf Club Road (now Sime Road).
- Meyer Flats
- Meyer Park, a condominium complex featuring one 21-storey block and one 11-storey block. It was designed by architect Thng Hooi Haw, who intended to provide every unit with an "angular" view of the sea. In February 2023, it was sold en bloc to United Venture Development, a joint venture between the UOL Group and the Singapore Land Group, for $392.18 million.
- Mindanao Gum Tree (displayed at Katong Park)
- Sea View Hotel, which opened in 1906. Owned by Manasseh Meyer, it was leased to Eleazar Johannes in 1912. It took over the nearby Grove Hotel as an annexe by the following year. The Sarkies Brothers became the managers of the hotel in 1923, after which it underwent a major refurbishment. The estate of Meyer took ownership of the hotel in 1931. In 1936, it was described in Willis' Singapore Guide as one of three leading hotels in Singapore. It was closed in 1964, after which it was demolished.
- Tanjong Katong MRT station (Exit 1)
- Tanjong Rhu Road
