= Sea View Hotel =

Former hotel in Singapore (1906 to 1964)

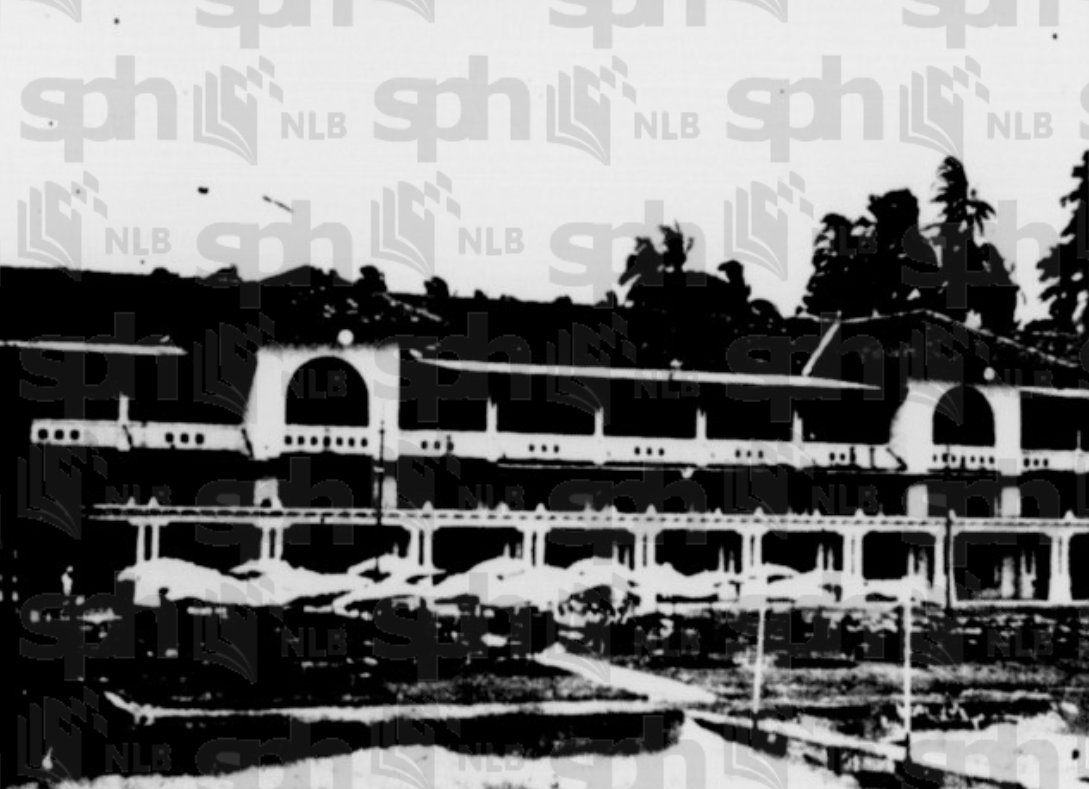
The hotel in 1928

Sea View Hotel was a prominent hotel on Meyer Road in Singapore. Opened in 1906, it was converted from a bungalow owned by businessman Sir Manasseh Meyer, the road's namesake. In 1923, the hotel came under the ownership of the Sarkies Brothers, prominent hoteliers, after which it received extensive refurbishments. In its heyday in the 1930s, it was popular, especially with those who had recently recovered from an illness. The hotel suffered from several strikes in its final years of operation. It closed in 1964, after which it was demolished. Another hotel, also named Sea View Hotel, opened near the former premises of the original hotel in 1969.

== Description ==
At the hotel's opening, the hotel building was described by The Straits Times as "longish, broad, bright-looking." It was fitted with specially designed furniture. The dining rooms and bars opened towards a lawn with coconut trees in front of the shore. The rooms, which had access to a 450ft-long verandah and passageway in front facing the sea, and another at the rear for the "boys who are never allowed to use the front communication", were located away from the "noise and bustle" of the dining rooms and bars. Each of the 40 rooms had a sitting room, a bedroom, a boxroom and a bathroom. There were also rooms for events. Guest rooms were also provided with electric bells. Amenities included a shooting gallery adjacent to the hotel and tennis courts, as well as two bathing pagars that were the "largest along the coast" at their completion. The two bathing houses, one for men and the other for women, stood above the water. The hotel also had an outdoor beer garden with a fountain accompanied by a neo-classical statue as its centrepiece. The fountain was Italian-sculpted and installed for $10,000. A November 1922 article in The Malaya Tribune described the hotel building as "rambling" and "old" with "no charm." However, it also stated that the hotel was "always cool", an "ideal spot on a moonlit night" and featured "good" service and food.

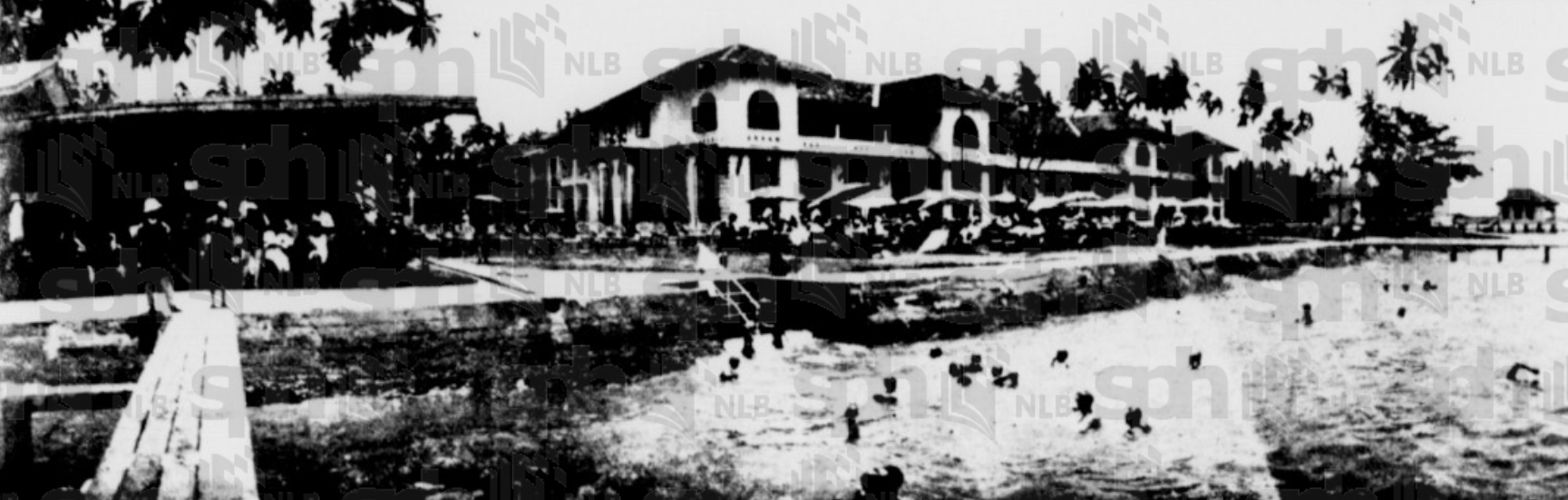
The swimming pagar next to the hotel in April 1927

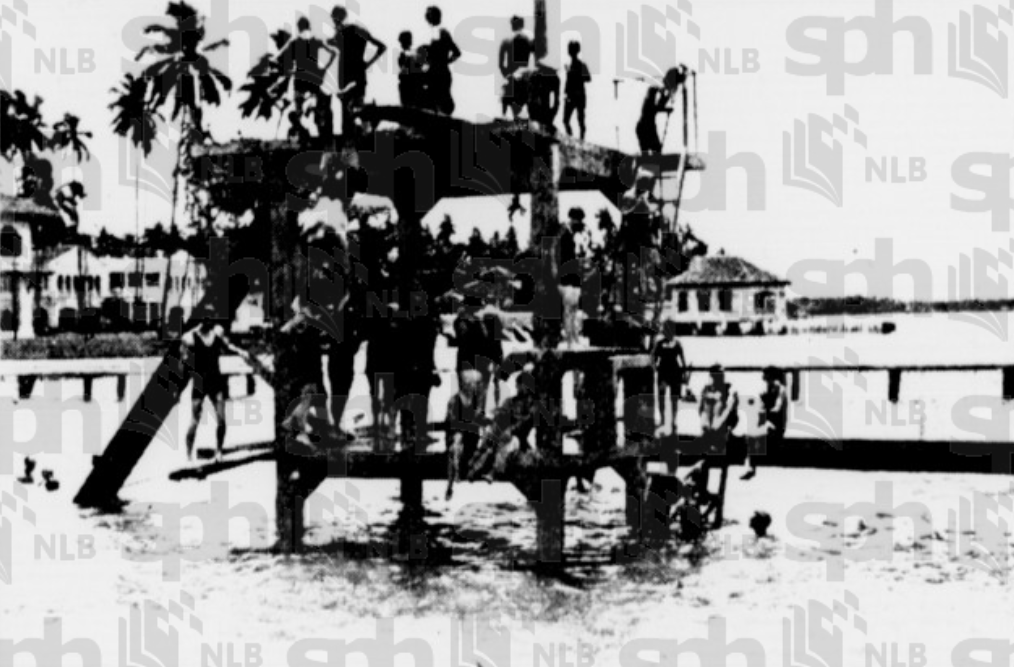
The diving stage at the swimming pool

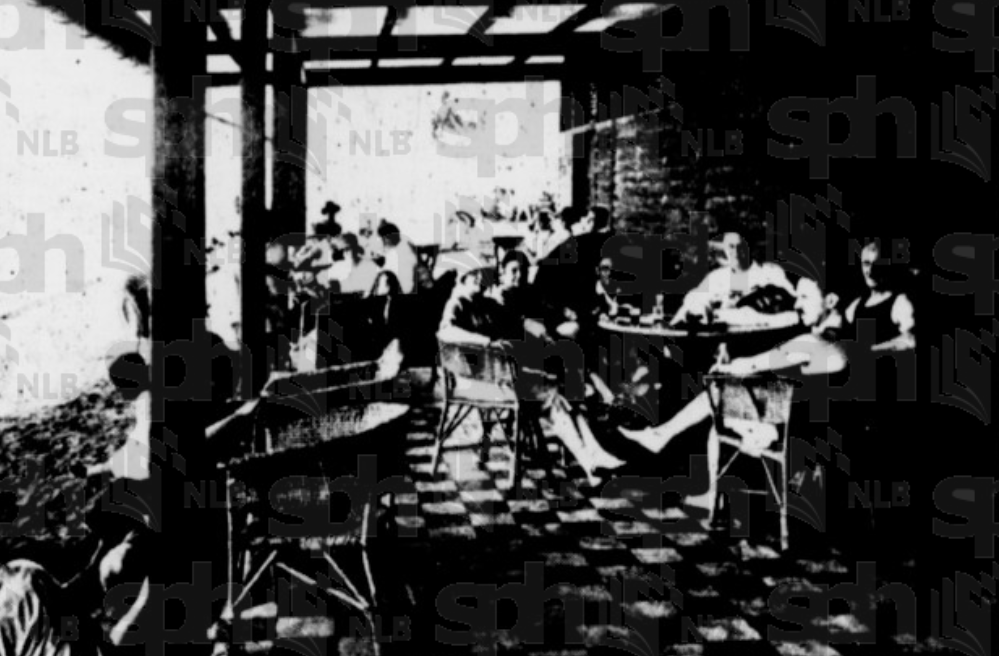
The verandah at the bathing house

The wing of the hotel completed in 1925 faced the sea. Its ground floor featured an office, a dining room-cum-grill room, a bar and a 150-ft long ballroom. Guest rooms, each with its own sea-facing sitting room and bathroom, could be found above. A "most modern" septic tank was installed to serve both the old and new wings. A new bathing house was erected in front of the hotel. The building had changing rooms for men and women, a verandah for spectators and a bar at the end. It was accompanied by a saltwater tank to allow for seawater baths "irrespective of tides." Other amenities included an open-air cinema which operated after dinner on Wednesdays and Sundays. The hotel also had a sea swimming pool surrounded by reinforced barriers to prevent sharks from entering. Bathing costumes and towels were available at a cost. In addition to tennis, golf was also offered to guests. Cabarets and performances were then sometimes held at the hotel.

By 1953, the hotel had 69 rooms, all with baths and telephones. Some also featured porches, as well as hot and cold water. 20 of the rooms also featured air-conditioning. However, McKay's Guide to the Far East and the Middle East recommended the "large" rooms on the second floor without air-conditioning featuring porch sitting rooms overlooking the ocean as the "most desirable", while noting that the rooms in the air-conditioned wing were "small" and "dreary". Dances were then hosted at night on all days except Sunday. There was also a play area for children. The guide wrote that the hotel was "delightful", recommending it to "all except those whose time in Singapore is limited and who wish to be closer to the shops and offices." By February 1957, 42 of the 69 rooms featured air-conditioning. There were then four tennis courts. According to a November article in The Singapore Free Press wrote that the hotel offered a "unique" location and "excellent" food. The cost of staying at the hotel ranged from "moderate to not so moderate" and an Italian band was then regularly performing there. There was a domed dining room and a "Chicken Inn" Grill Room, which was known for its "chicken in the basket" and "chicken in the coconut." On Sundays, it also served chicken curry tiffin. There was also a Jungle Bar, with "wines from all parts of the world" and bartenders "who would mix you any cocktail you cared to name."

== History ==
The seaside colonial bungalow in which the Sea View Hotel was housed was owned by businessman and philanthropist Sir Manasseh Meyer. In March 1906, it was announced that a hotel would be established by the sea at the "salubrious" district of Tanjong Katong. The hotel building, which stood in an "excellent position", was designed "with an eye of everything that goes to spell success and comfort in a tropical Hotel." It was located near the terminus of the local tramway, where rickshaws were stationed to ferry hotel guests to and fro. There was also a regular launch service running between the hotel and Johnston's Pier. The hotel was to be ready by the middle of May, with the first beer garden on the island. It was opened by A. J. de Souza, who had already made a name for himself as a hotelier on the island, on 2 June 1906. The Eastern Daily Mail and Straits Morning Advertiser praised de Souza for converting the "dreary, barn-like building" into a "first-class hotel." The bathing pagars were completed by the end of the month. A month later, The Straits Times reported that de Souza had been organising various events at the hotel that have "had for their object the entertaining of visitors" since its opening. These included a "Canoe regatta", a "Venetian night" and an event on 14 July celebrating French Independence Day.

In 1912, Eleazar Johannes became the manager of the hotel. He installed electric lights and fans. Aviator William B. Atwater gave a Hydro-Aeroplane exhibition at the hotel on 29 December 1912. However, an article in The Weekly Sun described it as a "farce" as "apart from rushing over the water for about two miles in the Hydro-Aeroplane Mr. Atwater did nothing". According to the article, "Many hundreds" of people came to the event, only to be left "disappointed and angry". In the following year, a nearby bungalow was acquired as an annexe for the hotel, providing additional rooms. It was named the Grove Bungalow. By then, the nearby Grove Hotel had also been taken over as an annexe.

=== Sarkies Brothers ===
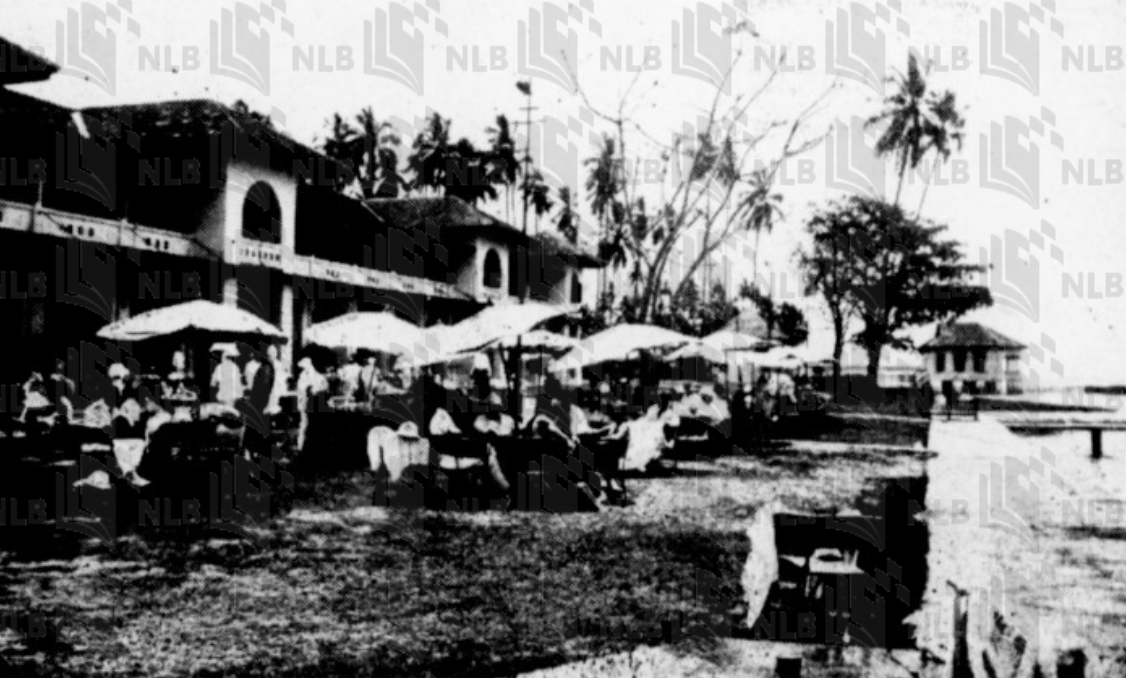
The hotel in April 1927

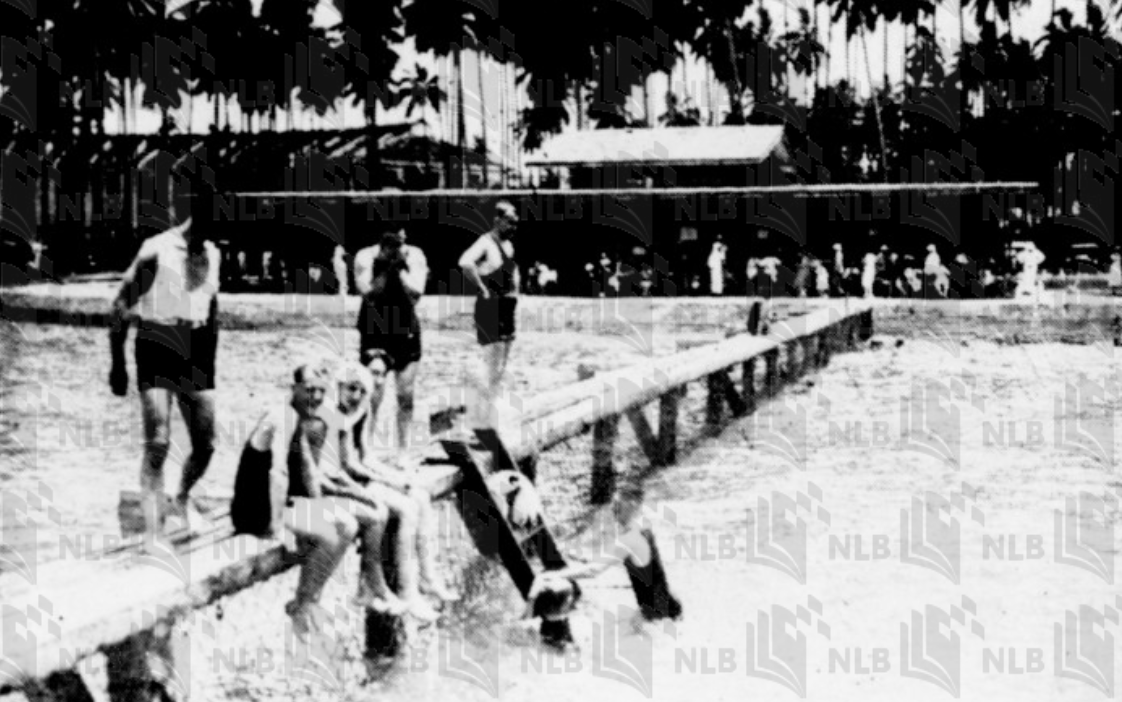
Guests bathing at the hotel in April 1927

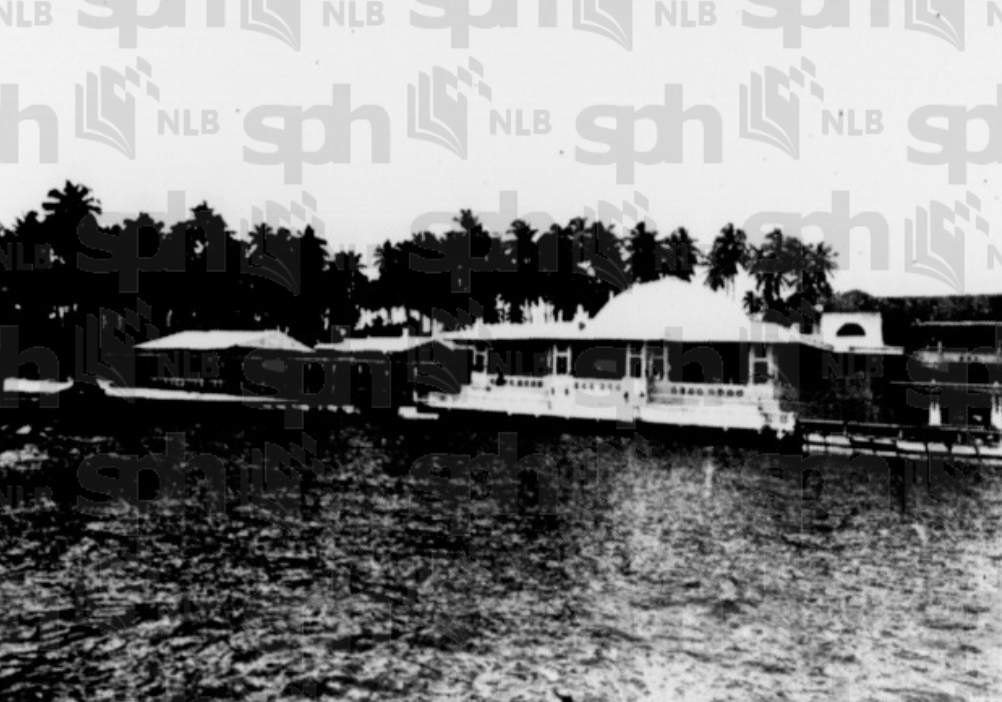
Exterior of the new ballroom

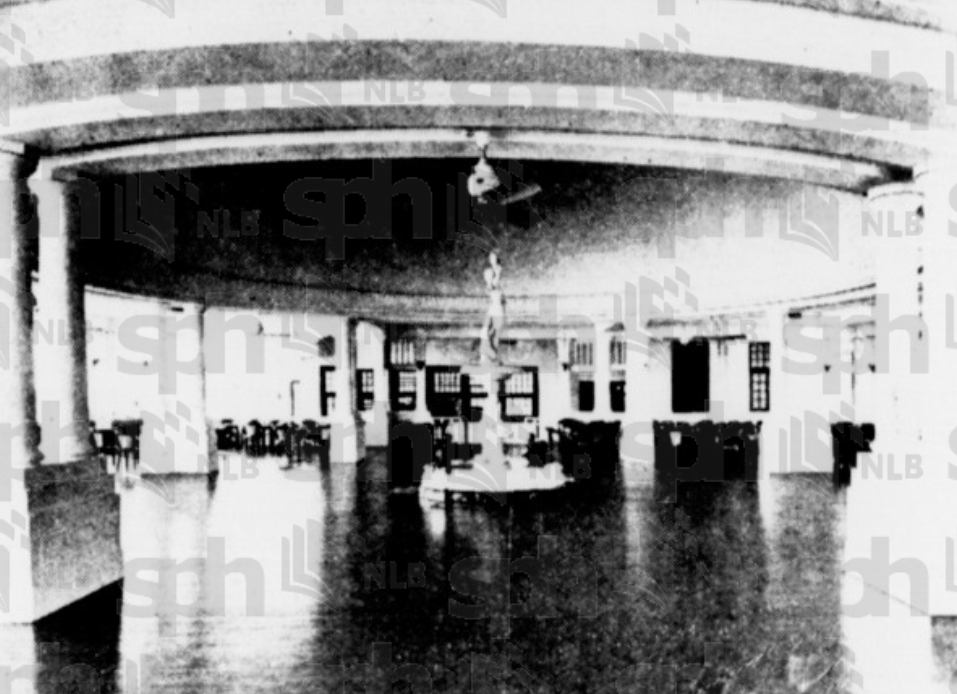
Interior of the new ballroom

Johannes died in October 1921. On 1 February 1923, management of the hotel was transferred to the Sarkies Brothers, prominent hoteliers in Singapore. In January of that year, it was announced that the building would be rebuilt, with the ground floor designed as a pavilion encompassing a ballroom, a dining room and billiard's room with 30 rooms located on the floor above. There were also to be "increased facilities for bathing accommodation". A building at the corner of Meyer Road and Tanjong Katong Road facing the Crescent Flats was also acquired by the Sarkies, who planned to renovate and reopen it as a cafe, bakery and confectionery serving the surrounding neighbourhood.

In April 1925, A. F. Peate became the hotel's general manager. A new wing and bathing house was completed in April 1925. An article in the Pinang Gazette and Straits Chronicle wrote that, with the extension, the hotel was "likely to be an increasingly popular Sunday to Monday resort." The taxi ride to the hotel from the Tank Road railway station then cost a dollar. In July, it was announced that a bathing pagar was to be built. A temporary bathing pagar was opened in August, around three months before the completion of the actual pagar. In January 1926, Peate was transferred to the Raffles Hotel, after which he was replaced by Frank Deason, previously the secretary to the Singapore Cricket Club.

In February 1927, it was announced that the hotel would undergo significant renovations, which were to be completed in around eight months, adding "very considerably to the amenities of this popular seaside rendezvous. The whole sea frontage, which then included the dining and dancing hall and lounge, was to be converted into guest rooms with verandahs, while the kitchens at the rear were to be moved behind the bathing pagar, with the space being repurposed as stores. A new dancing and dining pavilion was to be built between the pagar and the main building. A new building, designed by Swan & Maclaren Architects, was also to be erected in between the sea and bathing pagar and the lawn and open-air cinema. In 1931, the executors of the estate of Manasseh Meyer, who had died in the previous year, took over the hotel on the bankruptcy of the Sarkies Brothers. In March 1933, scenes from the Clyde E. Elliott film The Devil Tiger were filmed at the hotel. In 1934, Heinrich Otto Waser became the general manager of both the Sea View Hotel and the Adelphi Hotel. He was replaced by Robert Gerber, who served as the manager until the hotel's closure in 1942.

In August 1942, the hotel, under the Japanese Occupation of Singapore, housed a party of Thai repatriates on their visit to Singapore. By April of the following year, it had reopened as the Nan Mei Kaku Hotel. In November 1945, following the end of the occupation, the hotel temporarily housed evacuees from Surabaya. It was then occupied by the Recovery of Allied Prisoners of War and Internees, which used the hotel as a forces transit camp. The hotel was derequisitioned on 15 July, after which it was reopened, becoming the third hotel to reopen for civilian use in Singapore following the occupation. Gerber served as the camp's manager. In the same year, Waser's son, Henri J. Waser, became the hotel's manager.

The hotel was one of the first in Singapore to have been located away from the town centre. It was "especially popular with clients who had recently recovered from illness and were seeking the tranquillity of an idyllic seaside resort surrounded by coconut trees to rest and recuperate." The hotel peaked in popularity in the 1930s, with the 1936 edition of Willis' Singapore Guide calling it one of the three leading hotels in Singapore, along with the Adelphi Hotel on Coleman Street and the Raffles Hotel on Beach Road. The "spacious and airy" ballroom hosted "many popular dances and balls, many of them held to raise money for charity.

=== Strikes and closure ===
On 26 August 1955, 450 hotel workers at the Sea View Hotel, the Adelphi Hotel, the Gleneagles Hotel on Napier Road and the Cockpit Hotel on Oxley Rise went on strike after negotiations between union representatives and the Hotel Association of Singapore fell through. Of these, 150 were employed at the Sea View Hotel. The Singapore Workers' Union, which represented the strikers, initially demanded the minimum basic wage at the hotel be increased to $106. In September, the hotel's management made an offer of a $2 increase in the minimum basic wage, which would then be $92, but the union insisted on a minimum basic wage of $94. The union later claimed that it would be willing to end the strike if the wage was increased to $93. The union later accepted the offer of an increase of the minimum basic wage to $92, with the employees returning to work on 26 September. The Singapore Free Press wrote in November 1957 that it was a "popular rendezvous with Singapore's pleasure-seekers", offering a "feeling of spaciousness and graciousness and a mood of gracious living not often found in the modern hotel."

By August 1960, Lim Jew Kum had become the hotel's manager. On 6 November 1962, the hotel's employees, then represented by the Singapore General Employee's Union, went on a six-hour strike over unsettled wage claims. The hotel's management was told by the union to settle the claims by 8 November or face "further industrial action". The chair of the hotel's board of directors claimed to have not received the union's ultimatum. On 10 November, 166 employees of the hotel went on strike. The union demanded wage increases ranging from $18 to $20 a month, while the hotel's management offered only $10. The employees left at 2 p.m., leaving just the assistant manager, a secretary and Lim, who advised over 30 guests to find alternative accommodations, to operate the hotel. Wee Toon Lip, the union's assistant secretary, announced on 12 November that the striking employees would receive financial support from the employees of nine other Singaporean hotels. By then, there were still 21 guests staying at the hotel, with Lim claiming to have done "most of the work, including cooking" as the employees went on strike.

On 13 December, it was announced that all of the striking workers, then 164 in number, had been fired for failing to "carry out their contracts of employment." Employees vacating the staff quarters at the hotel were asked to vacate the premises by 22 December. However, Wee claimed that hotel management did not individually inform the workers of the termination and that they had only sent a letter to the union. Despite their firing, the workers continued to picket at the hotel. The strike ended on 5 February, with the union and hotel management having agreed upon wage increases of $10 to $17. The employees then made bonfires with the protest posters and banners used in the strike. They returned to work the next day, having received their increments and bonuses for the year of 1962 backdated to 1 June. On 8 October, the workers, now represented by the Singapore Association of Trade Unions, again went on strike, along with the employees of the Raffles Hotel, the Adelphi Hotel, the Ambassador Hotel and the Ocean Park Hotel. The general manager of the hotel then was A. M. Peach, who claimed that management was "coping very well".

The hotel closed in early 1964, with Seaview Hotel Ltd. having gone into liquidation as it was "no longer a paying concern." In May, 65 sets of its bed and living room furniture were auctioned off in "Singapore's biggest-ever auction of furniture." The fountain was also sold. In August, the 359,600 sqft property had been put up for sale, a few years before it lost its seafront as a result of the East Coast Reclamation Project. It was demolished soon after. In 1969, an 18-storey Sea View Hotel opened on nearby Amber Close.
