= Tanjong Rhu Road =

Road in Singapore

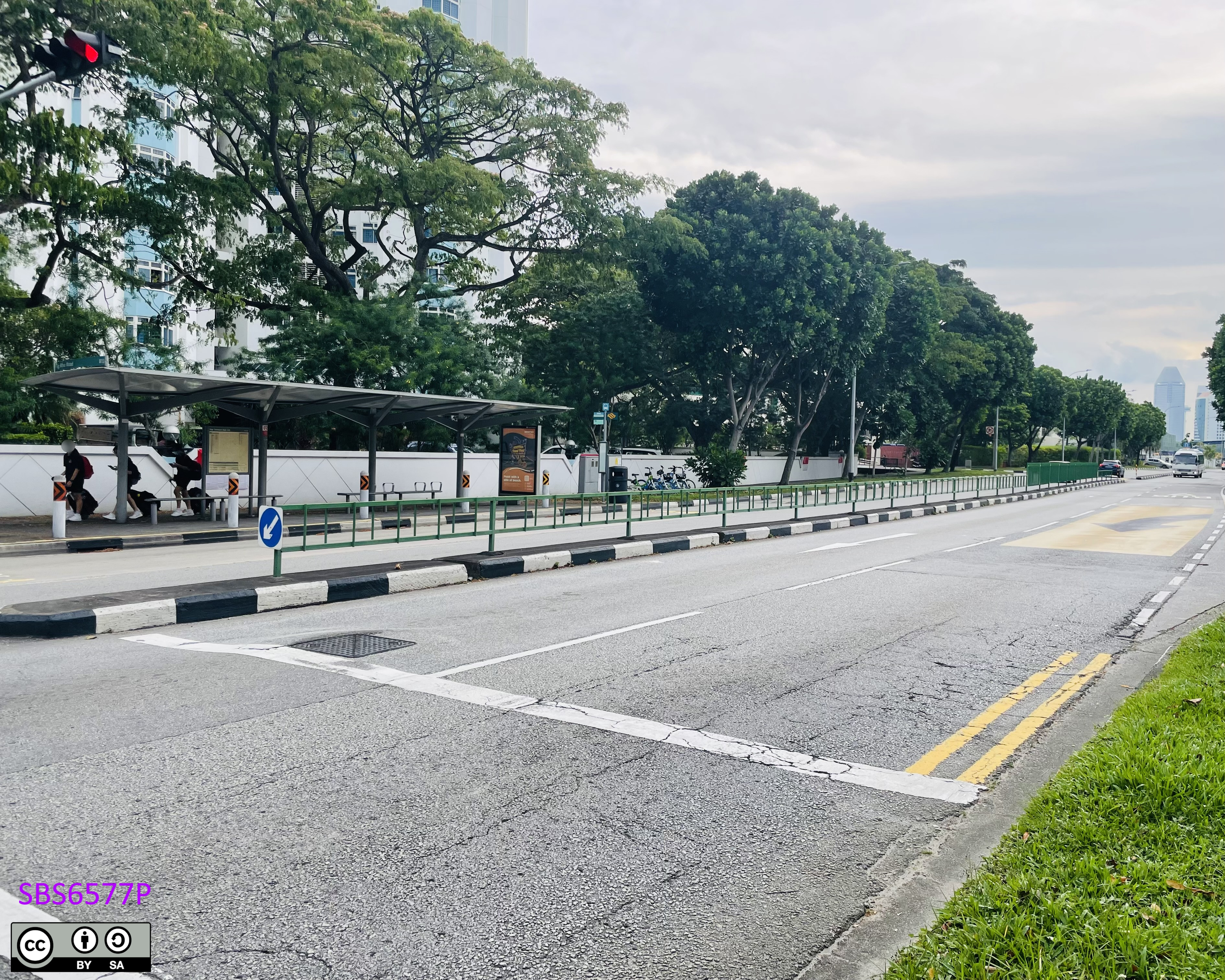
- Namesake: Pokok Rhus (Casuarina trees)
- Type: Minor Arterial
- Owner: Land Transport Authority (LTA)
- Maintained by: LTA
- Length: 2.6 km (1.6 mi); Estimated to be 2.6 km due to street having a loop and one-way access road
- Area: Tanjong Rhu
- Nearest Mass Rapid Transit System station: Tanjong Rhu MRT station and Katong Park MRT station
- From: Rhu Cross
- To: Junction with Meyer Road and Fort Road

Other
- Known for: Being a former shipyard.

Tanjong Rhu Road is a minor arterial road in Tanjong Rhu, Singapore. A combination of the words Tanjong (meaning cape) and pokok rhu (casurina littoria), the earliest mention of the road is thought to be in Emanuel Godiho de Erédia's 1604 map of Singapore where it was referred to as Tanjon Ru. In 1828, as a part of the Jackson Plan, Tanjong Rhu was made as a shipyard. However, there were squatters and water pollution in the shipyards, culminating in the government getting rid of them to build luxurious condominiums.

== History ==
Tanjong Rhu Road is named after the Malay words Tanjong (English for cape) and rhu (based on pokok rhu, where rhu refers to the casuarina littoria species of casuarina tree). Whilst it is unknown when the road was named Tanjong Rhu Road, it is known that the earliest source in which name appears is Emanuel Godiho de Erédia's 1604 map of Singapore, titled, Discripsao chorographica dos Estreitos de Sincapura e Sabbam, ano 1604, which refers to the area as Tanion Ru. Colonial maps of Singapore in the first half of the 19th-century referred to the area as Sandy Point, which was gradually replaced by Tanjong Rhu. The "Rhu" in Tanjong Rhu likely referred to the abundance of casuarina trees in the area.

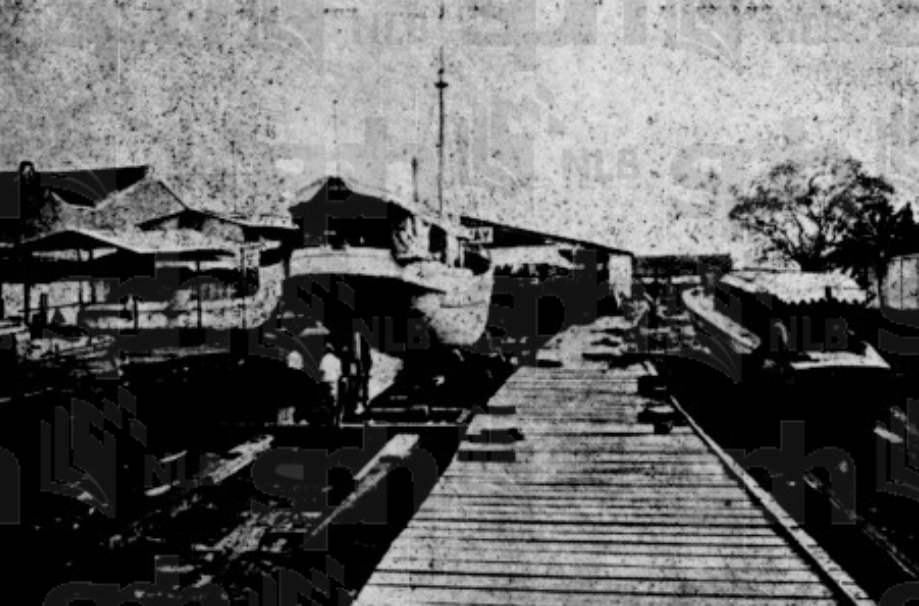
Vessels undergoing repairs at the shipyard in Singapore in January 1932

In 1828, as a part of the Jackson Plan, Sir Stamford Raffles intended for Tanjong Rhu to be a shipyard. Prior to the publication of the map, William Flint (who was a "[pioneer] of the shipbuilding business") decided to start a shipbuilding company in Tanjong Rhu in 1822. George Lyons and his brother also set up a shipyard in the 1850s. By the early 20th century, Tanjong Rhu became a venerable shipbuilding hub with many known companies having shipyards there such as Thornycroft and United Engineers as well as having clients such as the Singaporean Marine Police Force and the Ceylon Navy. As a matter of fact, bugis traders from celebes used to anchor their mosquito boats in the Kallang Basin by Tanjong Rhu for trade from the 19th century to the early 1960's before docking to the Telok Ayer Basin. In February 1977, government ordered for the Kallang Basin (including the Tanjong Rhu shipyard) to be cleaned up since it was polluted. This resulted in only five shipyards remaining as they complied with the government's prerequisite of upgrading their facilities as well as complying with pollution regulations by 29 June 1985. Additionally, the coffin-makers, firewood and charcoal dealers, godowns, rubber and sawmills, and squatters in Kampong Arang (near Tanjong Rhu Shipyard) were phased out by 1982, with them receiving compensation following recent appeals to the Singapore Land Authority. By January 1987, the charcoal and firewood dealers moved Lorong Halus at the mouth of the Serangoon River whilst the rest (except for the squatters) were moved to factories with proper apparatus for their respective skill trade.

== Details ==
Tanjong Rhu Road is a minor arterial road starting from Rhu Cross (a local access road) and ending at a junction with Meyer Road and Fort Road. It is estimated to be 2.56 km long due to the road having a loop and a one-way access road, both with the name 'Tanjong Rhu Road'. It runs parallel with the East Coast Parkway (ECP) whilst a section of the Kallang–Paya Lebar Expressway (KPE) runs underneath Tanjong Rhu Road.

=== Landmarks ===
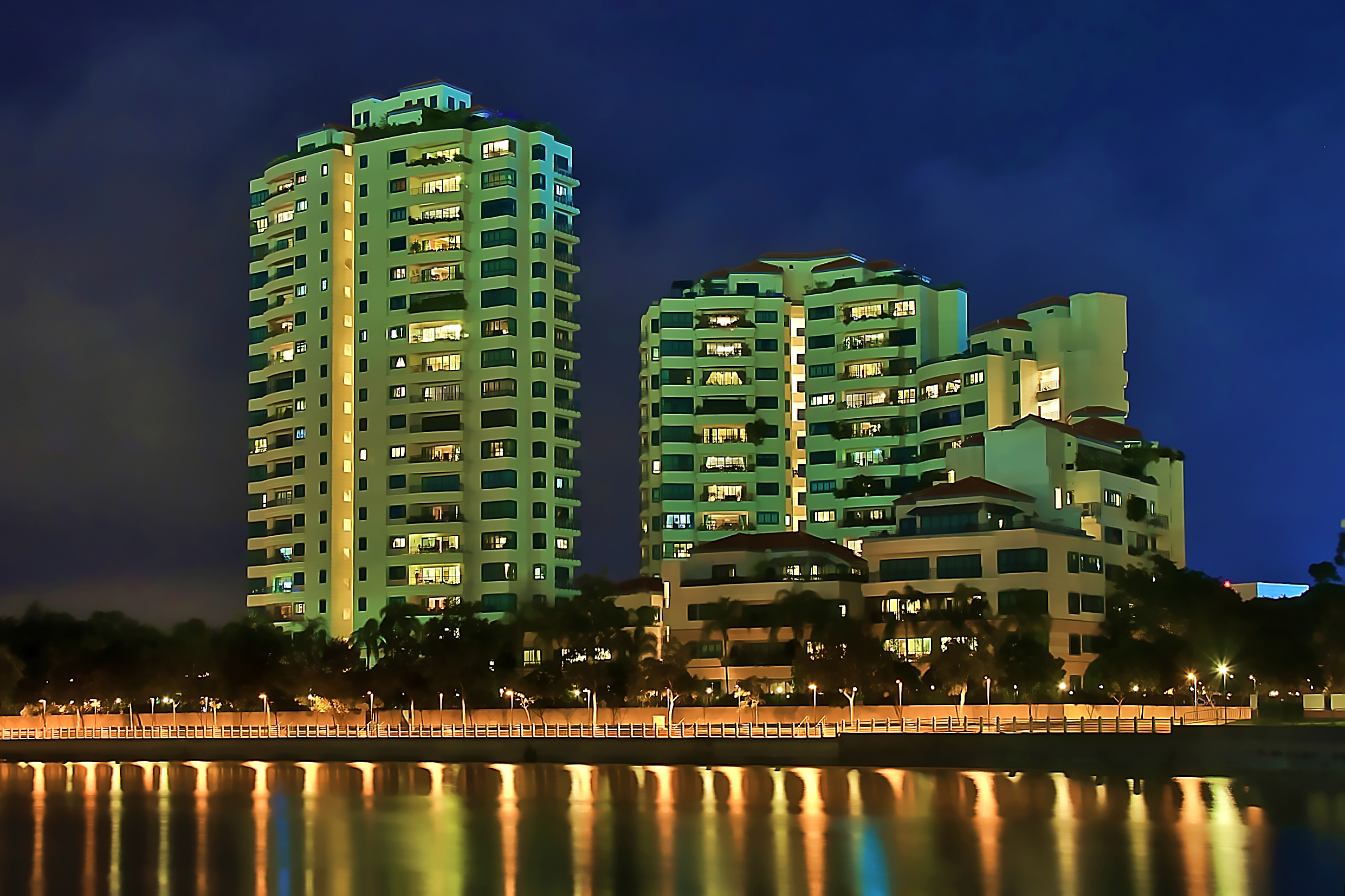
Camelot-by-the-Bay

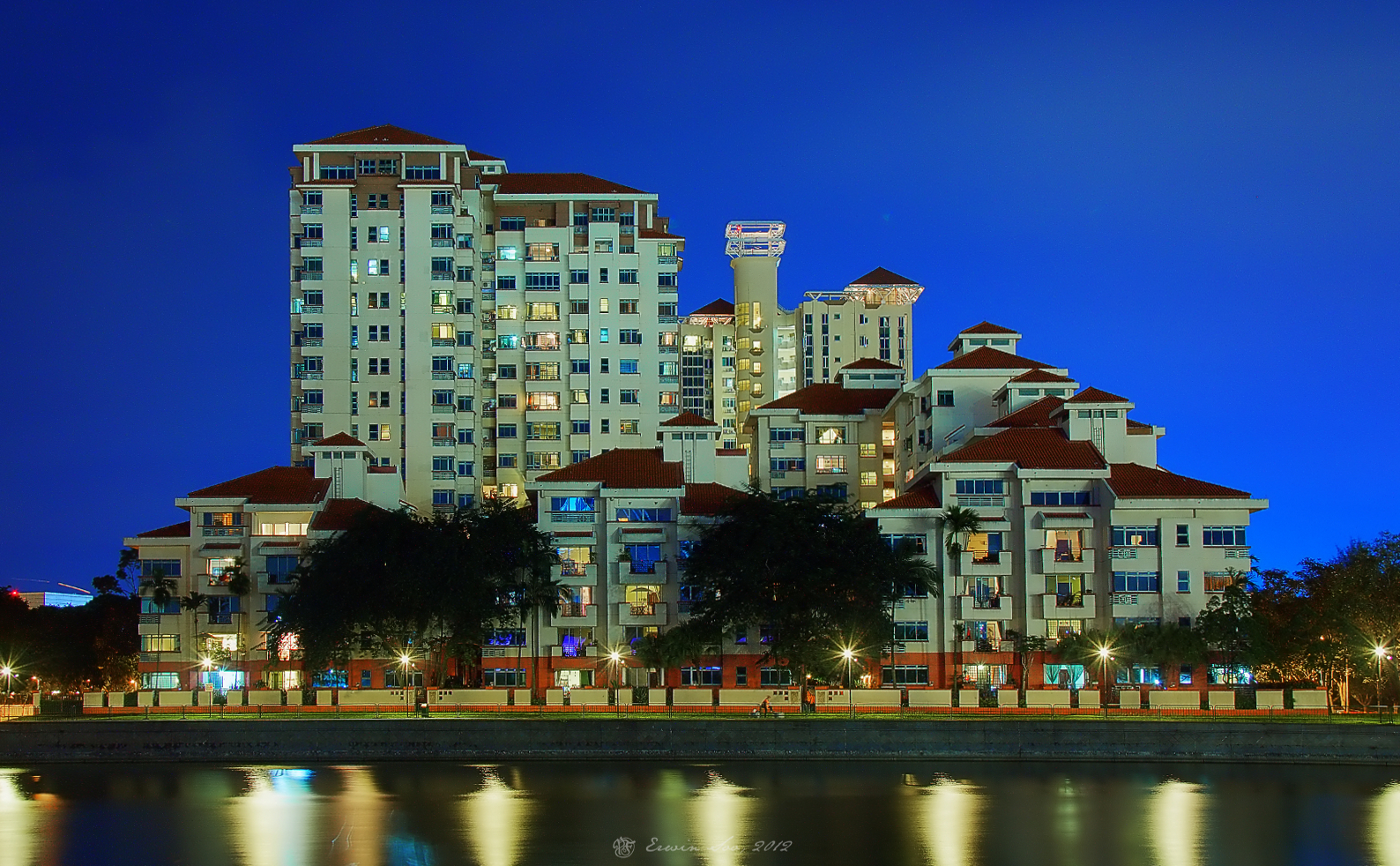
Casuarina Cove

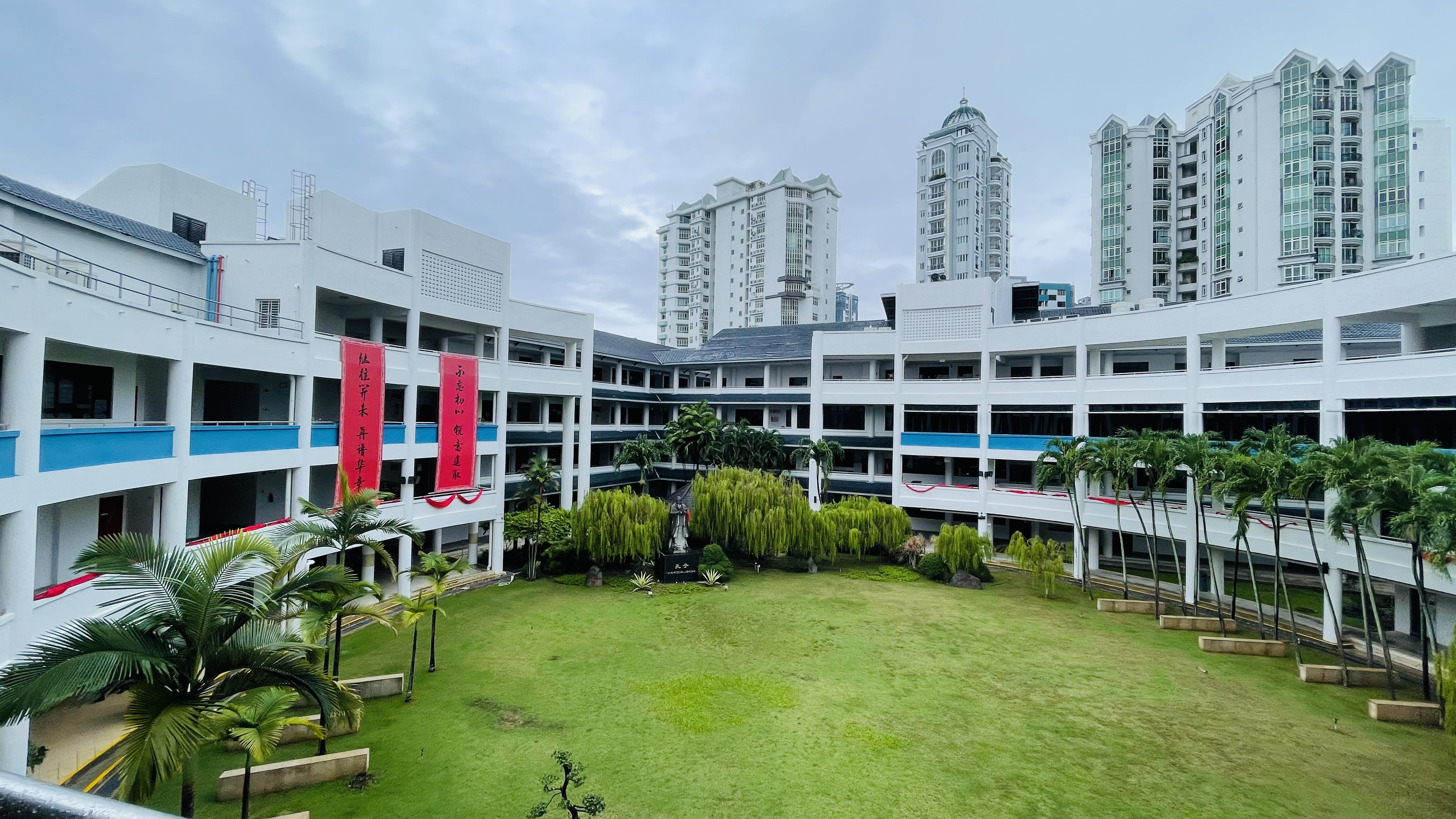
Dunman High School

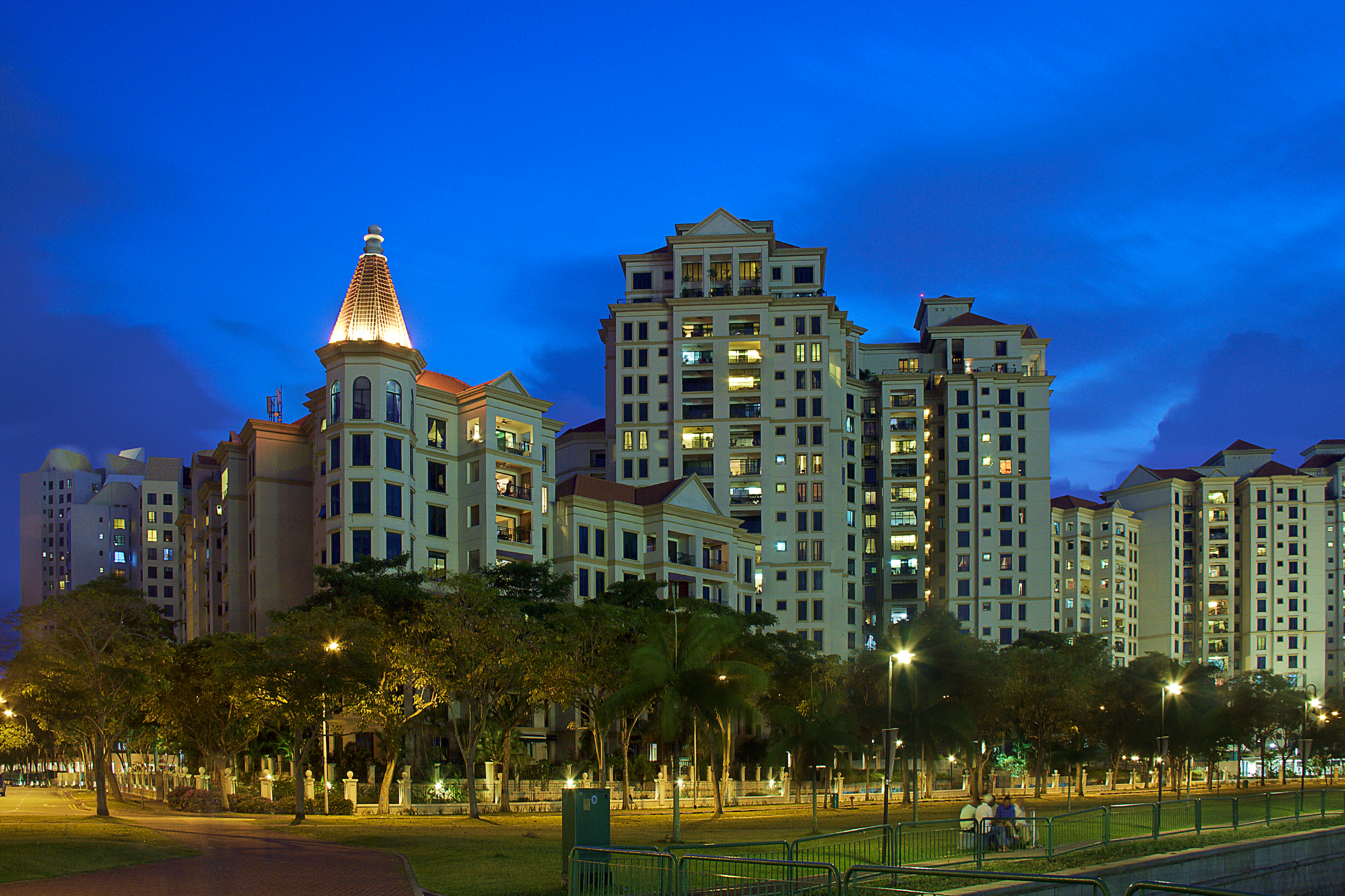
Pebble Bay

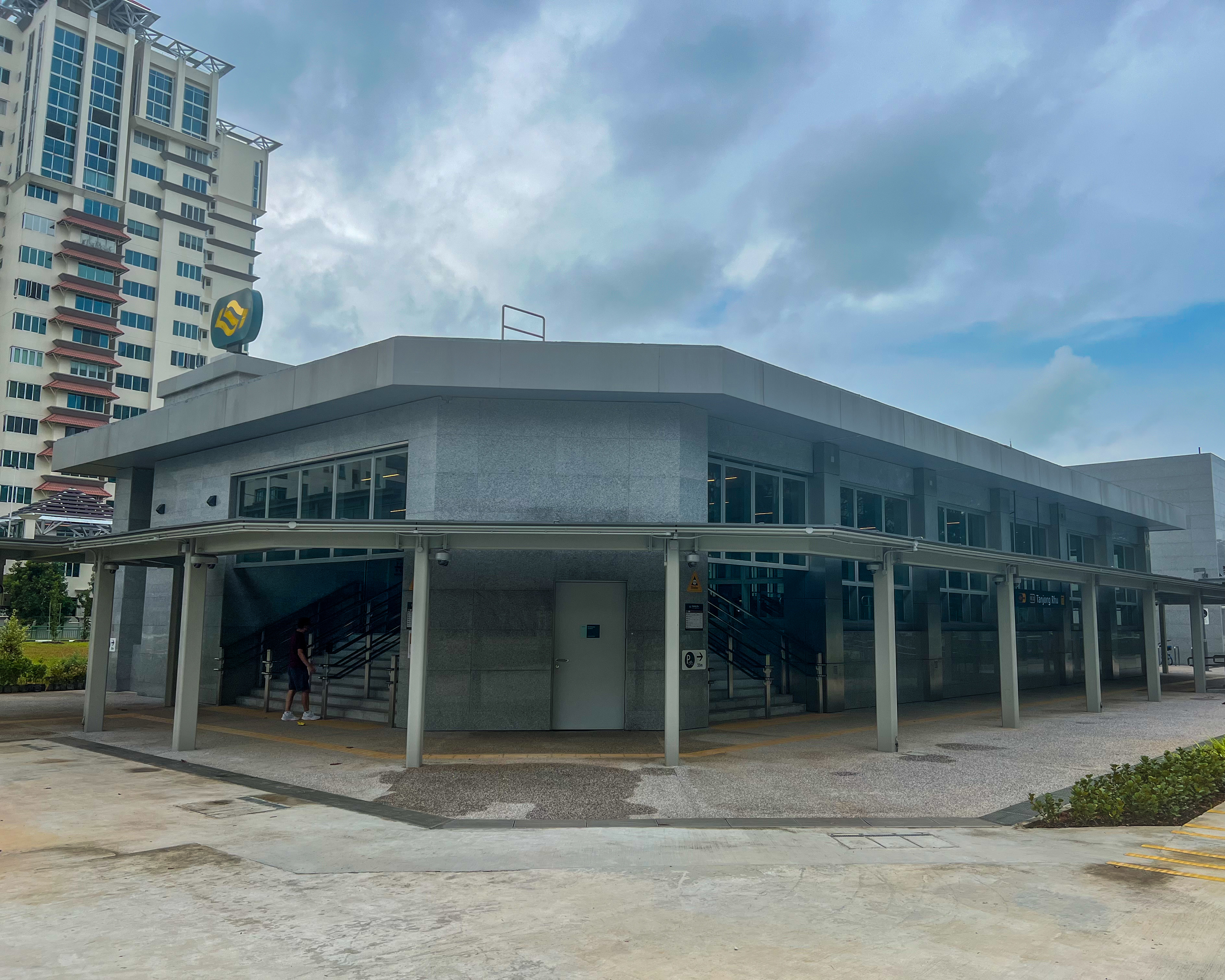
Exit 1 of Tanjong Rhu MRT Station

The following is a list of landmarks that are on or are in close proximity to Tanjong Rhu Road:

- Camelot
- Casuarina Cove
- Dunman High School
- Fort Road
- Fortredale, a 19-storey condominium which stood at the junction of Tanjong Rhu Road and Fort Road. Architect and academic Robert Powell wrote in 2000 that the "eye-catching" tower block "stands apart for its strongly individualistic expression." He further wrote that it "exudes confidence and defiance of convention" and "struts its stuff along Tanjong Rhu Road while its neighbours look, in comparison, aesthetically geriatric."
- Katong Park MRT station (Exit 2)
- Meyer Road
- Pebble Bay
- Singapore Swimming Club
- Pebble Bay
- Tanjong Rhu Bridge
- Tanjong Rhu MRT station (Exit 1)
