= Katong Park Hotel =

Defunct hotel in Singapore

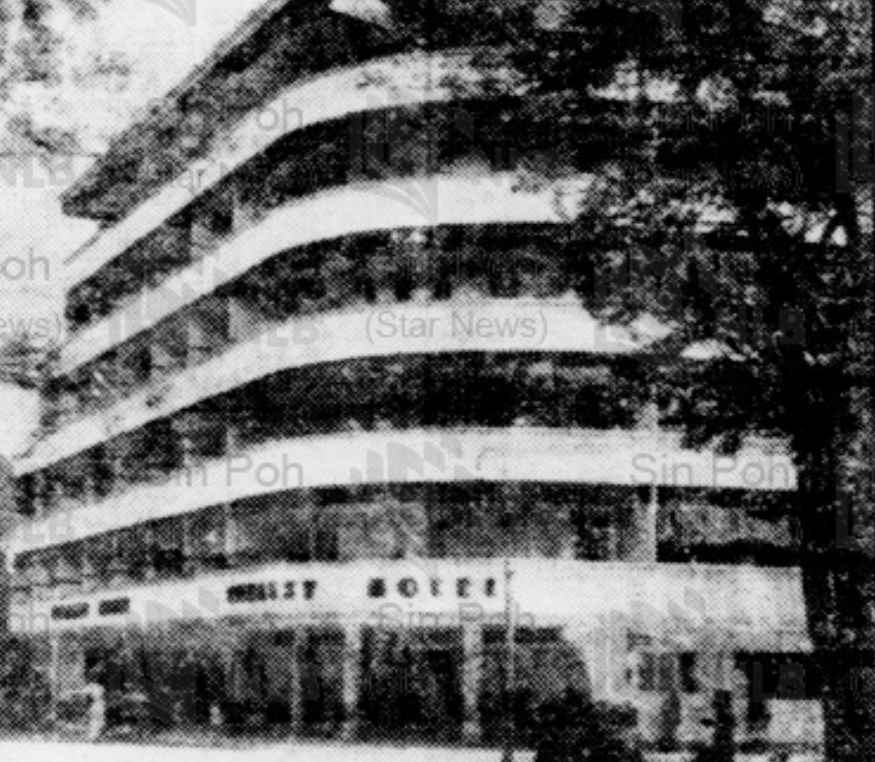
- The hotel's front entrance in 1953
- Former names: Embassy Hotel (1953-1960); Hotel Ambassador (1960-1982); Duke Hotel (1982-1992)

General information
- Status: Demolished
- Location: Singapore
- Coordinates: 1.29813°N 103.8872°E
- Opened: 26 April 1953; 73 years ago
- Closed: 1999; 27 years ago

Other information
- Number of rooms: 170
- Number of restaurants: Two (time of closure)

Katong Park Hotel was a hotel on the corner of Meyer Road and Arthur Road in Singapore. Opened as the Embassy Hotel in 1953, it was the "biggest" hotel in Malaya to have been opened following the end of World War II at the time. The hotel closed in the middle of 1960 and reopened as the Hotel Ambassador later that year under new management. It was again sold to new owners in 1982, after which it was renamed the Duke Hotel.

After an unsuccessful attempt to sell the property in 1990, then-owner Teo Lay Swee sold the hotel to the Chui family of Malacca in 1992, when it was renamed the Katong Park Hotel. There were initially plans to demolish the hotel and replace it with another larger, four-star hotel before it was again sold. In 1999, the hotel was sold off to First Capital Corporation, which closed it down for good and subsequently demolished the hotel building, which then made way for a condominium project known as The View @ Meyer, which was completed in 2010.

== Description ==
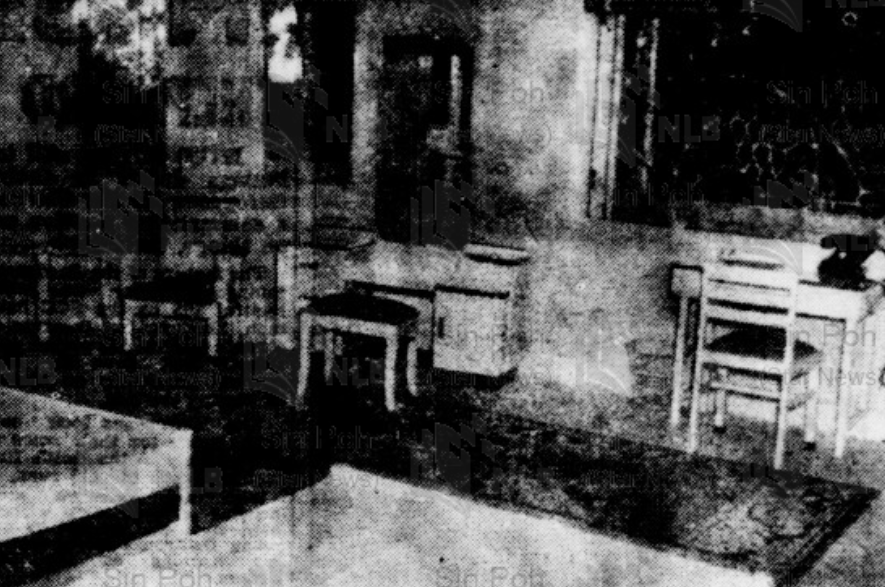
Guest room in 1953

According to The Straits Times, the six-storey hotel had 60 rooms at its opening, 12 of which were air-conditioned. Of the 60, 10 were single rooms while the rest were double rooms. Every room came with an attached bathroom, a verandah and a "magnificent view of Katong Park and the sea". The fifth floor was occupied by a 160-seat dining room. There was also a rooftop garden, as well as a barber's shop and a resident band. However, G. T. Boon of The Singapore Free Press reported that 18 of the 60 rooms were air-conditioned and that the dining room could seat 200. The Singapore Standard reported that 24 rooms were air-conditioned. The dining room offered a view of the sea and was "designed to admit the maximum amount of the sea breeze". There were seats on the balcony. Guests could arrange for a specialised menu. The dining room was accompanied by a ballroom, with dancing beginning at 8.30 p.m. and ending at midnight.

Telephones were installed in every guest room and complimentary room service was provided. Other features included collapsible windows and "ornate tralice-work". The Standard described it as "modern" and "designed to meet the requirements of a discriminating guest." The interior of the hotel was fitted with a concealed lighting system which "considerably enhances the beauty and neatness of the hotel's interior." The lights used Osram bulbs from the General Electric Company. The ground floor was occupied by the lounge and bar, as well as the reception room and the office. The bar and lounge were accessible from the street and fitted with furniture made by Keng Hua Furniture on Geylang Road. The rooftop garden was converted into a dance floor shortly after the hotel's opening and facilities of open-air dining were installed. A Malay-style "hut" was also being installed as decoration and to hide a water tank. There was a miniature rock garden with an orchestra stationed in front of it, as well as fake coconut trees. The "Skyline Bar" could be found in a corner of the garden.

In between the hotel's first closure and its reopening as the Hotel Ambassador, the total number of guest rooms was increased to 63, with all rooms being air-conditioned. Of the 63, six were double rooms while the rest were single rooms. The dance floors in the dining room and on the rooftop garden, as well as the bar at the garden, remained. Meals featuring Chinese and European cuisine were then served at the hotel. By 1962, the then-seven-storey hotel had 170 rooms, a coffee house, a cocktail lounge, a restaurant and a nightclub. It also had a swimming pool. Each room was provided with a video tape recorder. By February 1984, the hotel's lobby featured polished marble flooring and walls of onyx. The "huge" restaurant overlooking the park and bungalows below was then, according to Natalin Ling of The Straits Times, "very well preserved, with no signs of decay". Its dance floor was "polished". By its closure, the hotel had two restaurants, a health centre and open-air parking, the lattermost of which was located behind the hotel.

== History ==
=== Embassy Hotel (1953–1960) ===
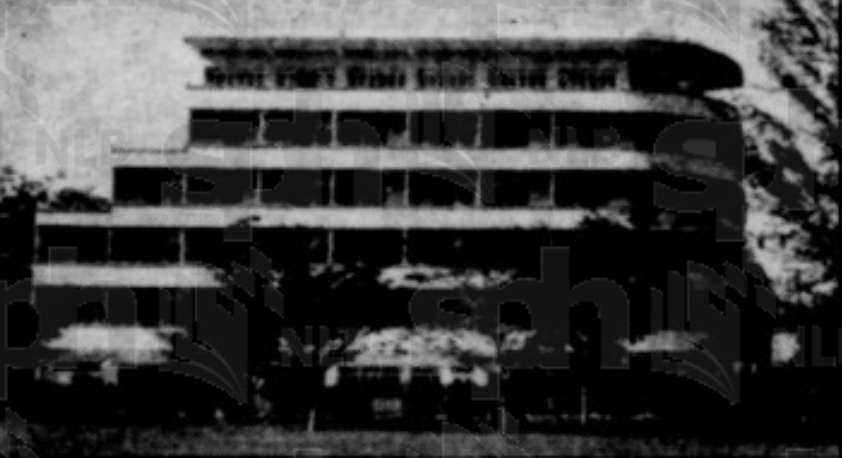
The Embassy Hotel in March 1953, a month before its opening

In March 1953, it was announced that the descendants of Lim Ah Eng, then the "biggest owners and controllers of hotels and bars throughout Malaya with a capital of millions of dollars", were to open the Embassy Hotel in April. The hotel, their 31st, was the "biggest hotel to open in Malaya since the war." It was built by Dr. S. H. Tan for $1 million. Each room then cost $700 a month for a single individual and $900 to $1,200 a month for couples. The staff then numbered around 80. Zee Chin & Co. was responsible for the construction. The hotel was opened on 26 April. Its manager then was Lim Jit Fong of Ipoh, one of the partners, while Miss L. Warren served as supervisor. A cocktail party, attended by 2,000 guests, was held in celebration of its opening. The Singapore Standard reported in May that the hotel was "gaining rapidly in popularity and reputation." The hotel then offered a service in which guests would be greeted upon their arrival in Singapore and brought to the hotel. Works on the rooftop garden were then underway, with management claiming that it would "become one of the most popular night spots in Singapore."

The hotel closed down on 24 June 1960, when officers from the Sheriff's office arrived to put the hotel's properties "under seal". The around 100 employees of the hotel were only then made aware of its closure. At the time, there were five Royal Air Force families staying at the hotel. They were forced to vacate the premises and find alternative accommodation. An auction for 136 of the former hotel's items, such as refrigerators and a grandfather clock, was held on 28 June.

=== Ambassador Hotel (1960–1982) ===
In the middle of July 1960, it was announced that the hotel would be reopening as the Ambassador Hotel with new management. However, a license for the proposed hotel had yet to be acquired from the Hotels Licensing Board then. The hotel was reopened as the Hotel Ambassador on 15 December, with David W. C. Foo, a local hotelier, serving as its new managing director. Foo claimed that the hotel was to cater towards the general public and that while hotels were "in great demand in Singapore because of the increase in the tourist trade", there was "still a shortage in hotel accommodation" in Singapore. The hotel underwent a three-month renovation, which cost around $500,000. This included the changing of furniture and bathroom fittings, as well as the redecorating of the interior of the guest rooms. Its manager then was Tilly Howard while former beauty queen Marion Willis was employed as a receptionist.

In June 1963, the meeting at which it was officially decided that the Singapore People's Alliance would enter into a political alliance with the UMNO, the Malaysian Chinese Association and the Malaysian Indian Congress, was held at the hotel. On 24 September, the first of approximately 37 bomb attacks in Singapore as part of Konfrontasi occurred at the hotel. The bomb itself had been planted near Katong Park. The attack shattered the windows on the first, second and third floors of the hotel. On 8 October, the hotel's employees, represented by the Singapore Association of Trade Unions, went on strike, along with the employees of the Raffles Hotel, the Adelphi Hotel, the Sea View Hotel and the Ocean Park Hotel. In 1967, 20 catering staff at the hotel went on strike. They received dismissal notices from the hotel on 31 March. The dispute was settled on 17 May, with the employees receiving $28,000 retrenchment and service benefits. A new wing was completed in the following year. The hotel was extended in 1970.

On the morning of 26 February 1972, a fire started in a store room on the second highest floor and spread to the dining room and kitchen above it. There were no casualties, with all of the guests having been successfully evacuated. The fire gutted the top floor and was estimated to have caused over $500,000 in damages. The hotel had just spent $3.5 million on renovations on that floor. The hotel's general manager then was Peter Barber. Its license was temporarily withdrawn on 1 March. It was returned on 6 September. In 1972, it was acquired by Ambassador Hotel Ltd.

=== Duke Hotel (1982–1992) ===
In August 1982, the company agreed to sell the hotel to Duke Hotel Pte Ltd for $29.5 million, some of which were used to reduce the company's overdrafts, which were $6.27 million last December. Duke Hotel Pte Ltd was a private company incorporated on 26 June. In January 1983, it was announced that renovation works at the hotel, which were projected to cost $1 million to 1.5 million, had begun, and were to be completed by March or April of that year. There was to be a new seafood restaurant located by the pool with a capacity for 200 to 300 people. The directors of the hotel had also already begun making plans for a future extension, which would add 200 rooms to the hotel. However, these plans had yet to be submitted to the Ministry of National Development. It was also announced that the hotel was to be renamed the Duke Hotel. By July, it was one of the last 13 buildings to have been classified by the Ministry of National Development as "energy-guzzling" and one of the last two in Katong, along with the Tay Buan Guan Supermarket. The hotel underwent a $4 million renovation and extension later that year. Guest rooms were fitted with new carpets, onyx walls were installed in the interior, the tiles of the swimming pool were replaced and the Duke Lounge and coffee house were extended.

By February 1984, the restaurant had also been renamed the Duke Restaurant. Ling then wrote a generally positive review of the restaurant, praising the quality and cost of the food. By then, the hotel no longer stood in front of the sea, but rather the East Coast Parkway. By May, the building had become one of the last five in Singapore that had yet to meet the "government standards for energy conservation in commercial buildings", along with the New Serangoon Hotel, the Golden Mile Tower, the Grand Building and the Tay Buan Guan Supermarket. The hotel's manager, Mohan Anda, claimed that there were already plans to install glazed windows in guest rooms, which would "bring the overall thermal transfer value (OTTV) down to acceptable limits". In October of the following year, some of the hotel's staff were retrenched as a result of occupancy rates falling to an average of 65 per cent.

By 1989, the hotel's then-owner, property developer Teo Lay Swee who was also the owner of the Cockpit Hotel, owed Singapore Finance around $25 million and another $1 to 3 million to Standard Chartered for the hotel. On 5 May, a winding-up petition for the hotel was filed as Standard Chartered had filed a lawsuit against Teo for his debts. It was settled that year. In March 1990, Teo put the hotel up for sale. By then, the hotel was reportedly profitable, with an occupancy of around 80 to 90 per cent and rooms costing $85 on average. He was "only willing to part with it for no less than $60 million." However, the asking price was "said to be too high" and he received no bidders for the hotel. The hotel's debts were settled by September.

In April 1991, The Straits Times reported that there were many visible cracks in the building, with some measuring 3cm in width. The Building Control Division claimed that while it had ordered the hotel's management to carry out "remedial work" on the structure, it was not in "imminent danger" of collapse. However, the newspaper claimed to have asked a structural engineer to inspect the place, with the engineer claiming that it needed "urgent structural repairs." According to the Building Control Division, complaints about cracks in the building had been made since 1986, with the cracks occurring at the junction between the original wing and the new wing of the hotel. The hotel was then undergoing renovation works which then-manager Joseph Yeo claimed to be for the "upgrading of the rooms." In the previous month, an engineer had already submitted a "remedial plan" to the division. This included the strengthening of the original wing's foundation and structure and the repairing of the cracks. It was later reported that the cracks were the result of the older wing being founded on bakau footings, which were settling around 2mm a year, while the new wing was founded on concrete footings. This, combined with the "natural soil movement", led to the formation of the cracks. In September, the hotel began offering free dancing lessons from Tuesdays to Thursdays due to a decline in patronage for the ballroom.

=== Katong Park Hotel (1992–1999) ===
In December 1992, it was reported that Teo had sold the hotel to Macau businessman Chui Iu, his sons Chui Vai Hou and Chui Vai Pui and local businessman Tan Boon Kiat, for $30 million. Teo claimed that he had put the property up for sale in order to focus on managing the Cockpit Hotel. The hotel was then renamed the Katong Park Hotel. The new owners then submitted plans to demolish the building to make way for a 22-storey four-star hotel with 288 rooms to the authorities. It was projected to cost $70 million. The new hotel was to be completed within five years and occupy both the site of the Katong Park Hotel and an adjacent vacant plot. It would have featured an outdoor swimming pool, a restaurant and a discotheque. The Katong Park Hotel then had an occupancy rate of around 60 per cent. It was Chui Iu's first commercial venture in the country. In August 1994, the hotel had to hire more staff to deal with high occupancy rates caused by a shortage of hotel rooms in Singapore. In the same year, the Tan family acquired the hotel from the Chui family.

In 1997, permission was obtained for a new 16-storey extension which would encompass a built-up area 4.2 times that of the original site. However, in September of the following year, the hotel was put up for sale. Kalpana Rashiwala of The Business Times then described it as "one of the oldest hotel sites in Singapore" and as a "landmark" of the Katong area. The owners were reportedly seeking between $40 and $50 million for the property. The hotel was closed in October. In January 1999, it was announced that the Central Provident Fund Board had requested that the High Court of Singapore declare the hotel insolvent to pay off the Tan family's debts of around $141,000 to the board as they had failed to pay their CPF contributions from November 1997 to May 1998. By then, the tenders received for the site fell "well below their expectations." The hotel had been declared insolvent by May. The hotel had also been taken off the market by then.

In June, the hotel was again put up for sale, with the owners seeking around $45 million for the property. This was done as the property market appeared to have improved by then. However, interest in hotel properties then was "limited". In addition to the plans for a 16-storey extension, the Tan family had made plans to redevelop the property into a 20-storey hotel with 486 rooms. In July, it was announced that the First Capital Corporation had successfully acquired the hotel for $42 million to redevelop the site into a residential development. The hotel was then demolished to make way for The View @ Meyer, a condominium complex launched by GuocoLand in 2007 and completed in 2010.
