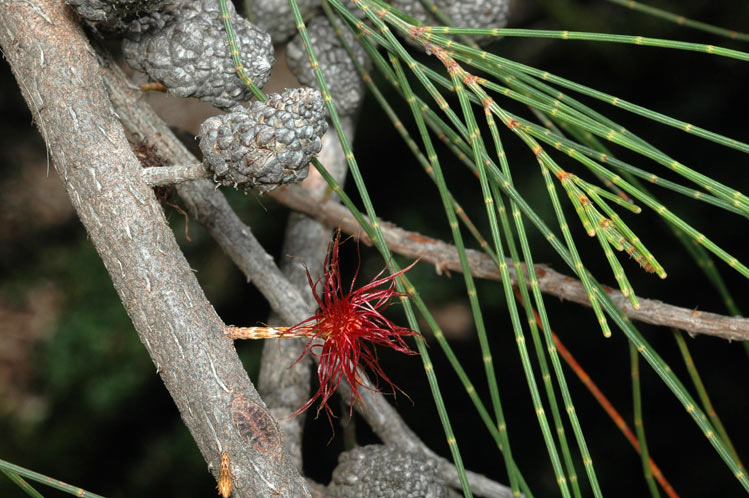
- Female cones

Conservation status
- Least Concern (IUCN 3.1)

Scientific classification
- Kingdom: Plantae
- Clade: Tracheophytes
- Clade: Angiosperms
- Clade: Eudicots
- Clade: Rosids
- Order: Fagales
- Family: Casuarinaceae
- Genus: Allocasuarina
- Species: A. littoralis

Binomial name
- Allocasuarina littoralis (Salisb.) L.A.S.Johnson
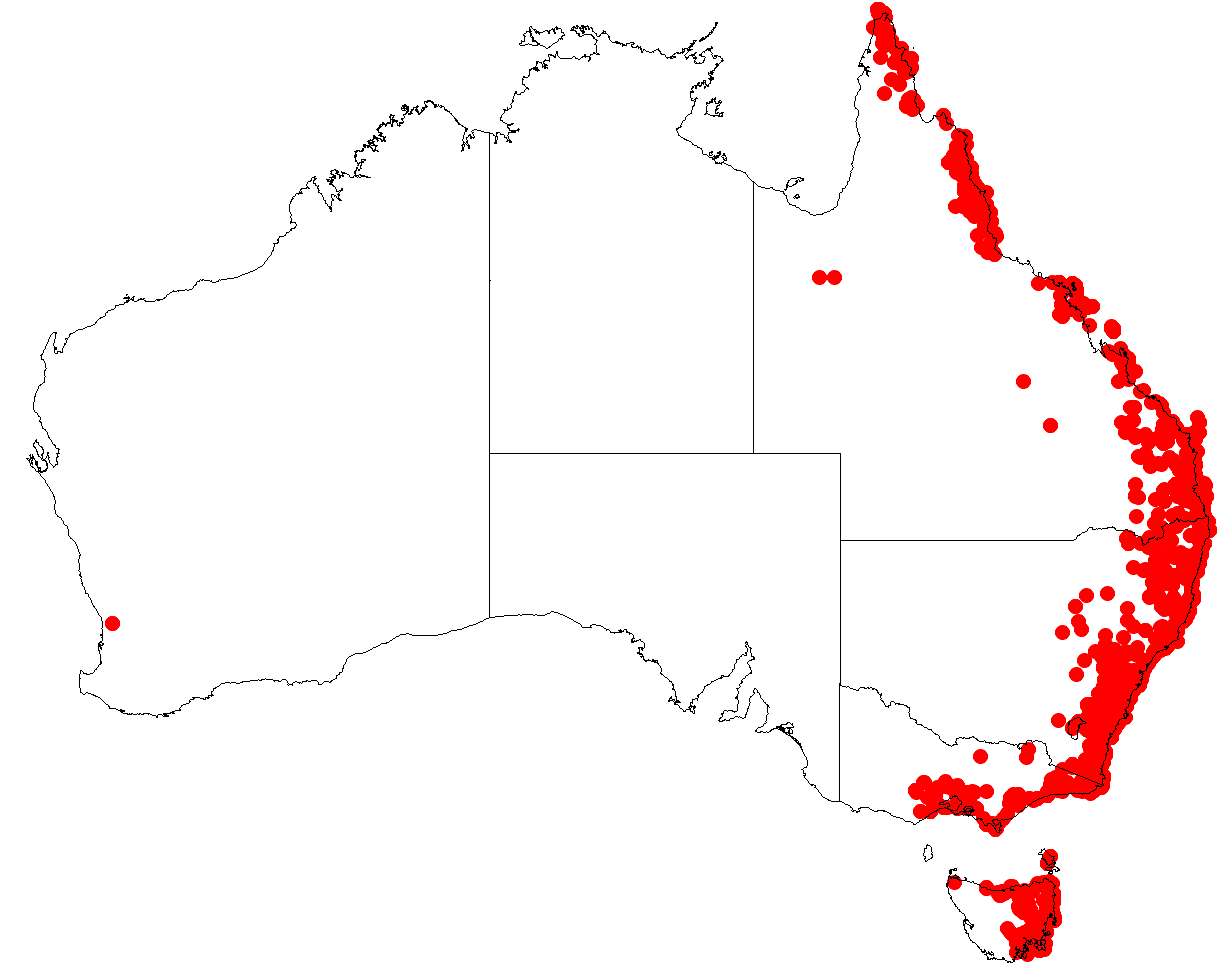
- Occurrence data from AVH

Synonyms
- List: Casuarina elegans L.Gentil nom. inval., pro syn.; Casuarina filiformis L.Gentil nom. inval., pro syn.; Casuarina leptoclada Miq.; Casuarina littoralis Salisb.; Casuarina moesta F.Muell. ex Miq.; Casuarina suberosa Otto & A.Dietr.; Casuarina suberosa Otto & A.Dietr. var. suberosa; Casuarina suberosa var. typica Domin nom. inval.

= Allocasuarina littoralis =

Species of tree

Allocasuarina littoralis, commonly known as black she-oak, is a species of flowering plant in the family Casuarinaceae and is endemic to eastern Australia. It is dioecious, or less commonly a monoecious tree or shrub, that has its leaves reduced to scales, usually in whorls of six to eight, the mature fruiting cones 10–30 mm (0.4–1 in) long containing winged seeds (samaras) 4.0–10 mm (0.2–0.4 in) long.

== Description ==
Allocasuarina littoralis is a dioecious, or less commonly a monoecious tree or shrub, that typically grows to a height of 5–15 m (16–49 ft). Its branchlets are usually up to 200 mm (7.9 in) long, rarely to 350 mm (14 in), the leaves reduced to scale-like teeth 0.3–0.9 mm (0.01–0.04 in) long, arranged in whorls of usually six to eight around the branchlets. The sections of branchlet between the leaf whorls (the "articles") are 4–10 mm (0.2–0.4 in) long and 0.4–1.0 mm (0.02–0.04 in) wide. Male flowers are arranged in spikes 5–50 mm (0.2–2 in) long, in whorls of six to twelve per cm (per 0.4 in), the anthers 0.4–0.8 mm (0.02–0.03 in) long. Female cones are on a peduncle 4–23 mm (0.2–0.9 in) long, the mature cones cylindrical, 10–30 mm (0.4–1 in) long and 8–21 mm (0.3–0.8 in) in diameter containing dark brown to black samaras 4–10 mm (0.2–0.4 in) long.

== Taxonomy ==
Black she-oak was first formally described in 1796 by Richard Anthony Salisbury, who gave it the name Casuarina littoralis in his Prodromus stirpium in horto ad Chapel Allerton vigentium from specimens collected at Botany Bay by Joseph Banks. It was reclassified in 1982 as Allocasuarina littoralis by Lawrie Johnson in the Journal of the Adelaide Botanic Gardens. The specific epithet littoralis means 'pertaining to the sea-shore'.

== Distribution and habitat ==
Allocasuarina littoralis mainly grows on sand in woodland in near-coastal areas and on nearby tablelands, sometimes in heavy clay or among rocks, and occasionally in tall heath. It occurs from Cape York in far north Queensland, through New South Wales, the Australian Capital Territory and Victoria, to the east coast of Tasmania and as far south as Hobart.

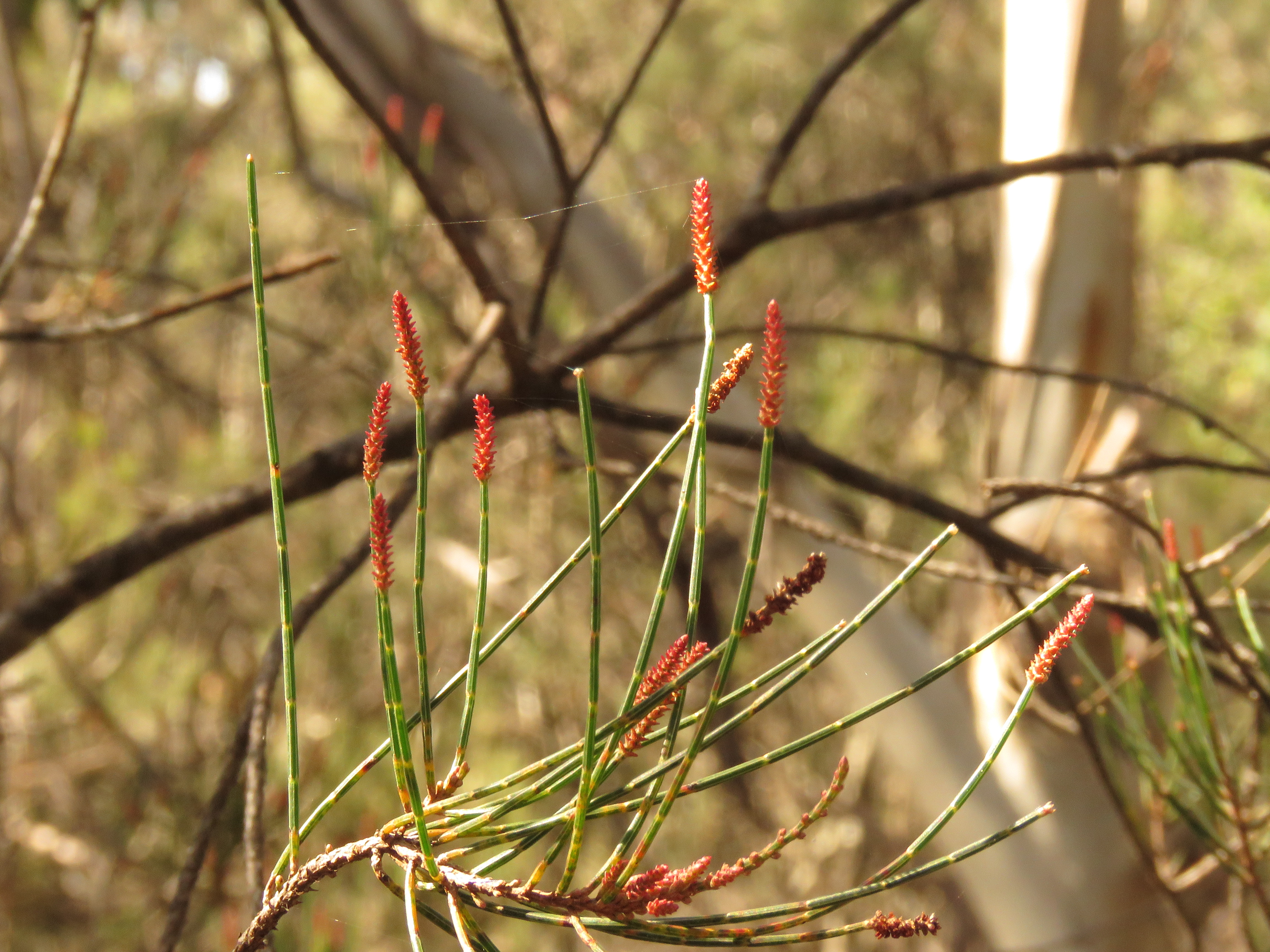
Male spikes

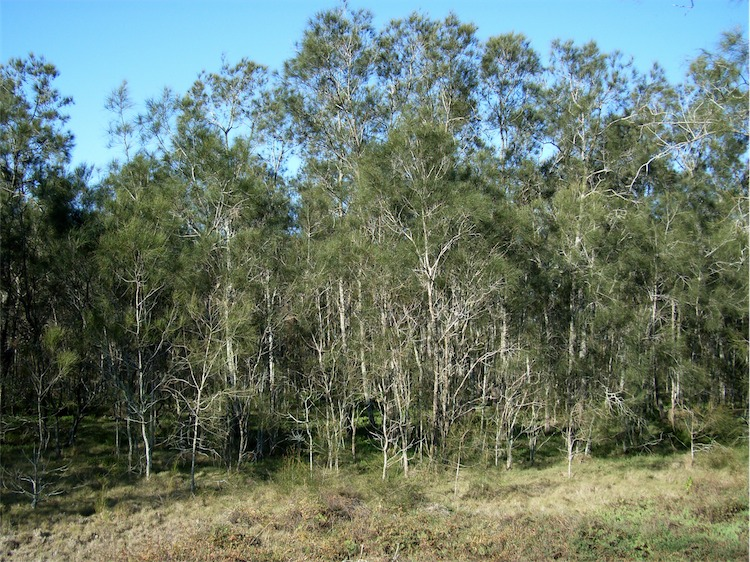
Habit near Brisbane
