= Willis' Singapore Guide =

Singaporean tourist guidebook

Willis' Singapore Guide, also titled Willis' Guide to Singapore, was a tourist guidebook targeted at sailors visiting Singapore. First published in 1934, it was written by A. C. Willis of the Marine Hostel in Singapore.

== Content ==
The guide began with a brief historical prelude. It included information useful to the average visiting sailor, such as exchange rates, bank locations, the process of berthing, a listing of Indian money changers, a listing of hotels and recommendations for boarding houses. Additionally, the guide also included many food recommendations, with an entire chapter dedicated to the Satay Club on Beach Road. Also included was advice on navigating traffic.

In the guidebook, Willis advised visitors to travel by the local trolleybus system instead of using rental cars or taxis as taking the trolley buses were much cheaper. Included in the guidebook was a planned route for sightseeing. In another chapter, Willis described the local industries, as well as local inventions. This included the solo-air system. The guide also covered the cities of Johor and Malacca. Four sketch maps depicting various parts of Singapore were included, highlighting several locations of interest to the average visiting seaman.

The 1938 edition of the guidebook extended its coverage to most parts of Malaya that tourists were likely to visit and included an entire chapter on Hong Kong.

== History ==
Willis' Singapore Guide was first published in April 1934, with its first edition going on sale for 40 cents a copy on 1 June. Its second edition was published in July and its third was published in September. The fifth edition of the guide was published in February 1935, enlarging the guide to 74 pages. It also contained a portrait of Sir Shenton Thomas, who was then the Governor of the Straits Settlements, with special permission. The guide's agent was the Malaya Publishing House. The sixth edition was published in January 1936 and cost one dollar per copy. A reviewer from The Malaya Tribune found the guide to be "genuine value for money and worth anyone's while to keep handy on desk or bookshelf." The reviewer also stated that the book "promises to become the standard guide on Singapore." A reviewer from The Straits Times wrote: "I should say that it is just the sort of book that a tourist wants when he sets out to do sightseeing, and the only improvement that might be made is the provision of a much more detailed index."

A reviewer from The Straits Budget wrote that the 1937 edition "contains an astonishing amount of information about our city, so much indeed that it is likely to provide ship-board reading for several days after the tourist has left Singapore behind." The 1938 edition was printed in Hong Kong. In April 1949, 5,000 copies of an up-to-date edition of the guidebook were distributed to visiting seamen for free.

The guidebook was written by A. C. Willis, who served as the Steward and later as the Assistant Superintendent of the Marine Hostel on Anson Road. He frequently took visiting sailors on tours around Singapore. His tours would sometimes go beyond Singapore to Johor, Kota Tinggi and the Pelepah Valley.
