= Manasseh Meyer =

British businessman (1846–1930)

Sir Manasseh Meyer
- ماناسيه ماير
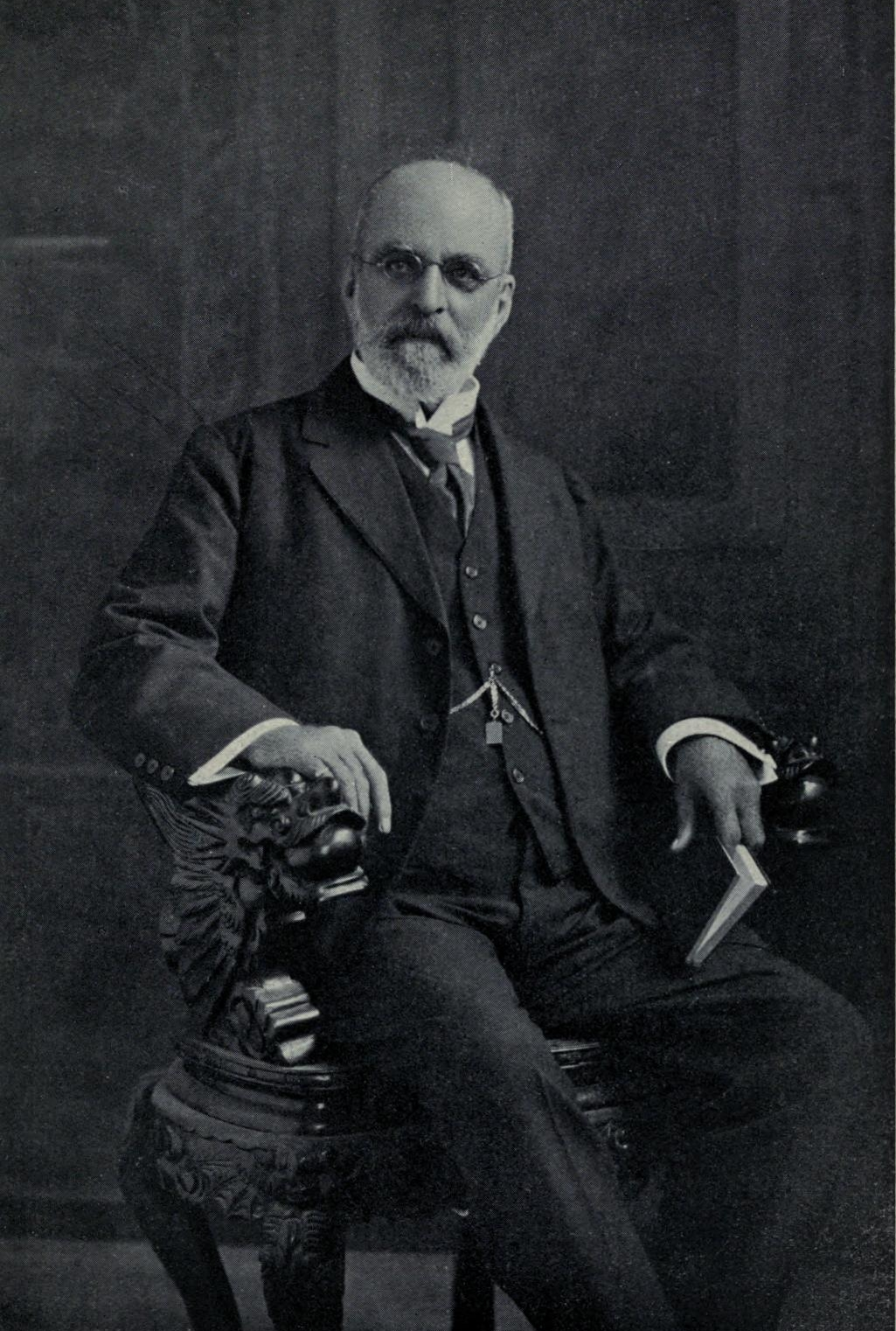
- Meyer in 1921
- Born: 1846; Baghdad, Iraq, Ottoman Empire
- Died: 1 July 1930 (aged 83–84); Singapore, Straits Settlements
- Citizenship: British
- Education: St Joseph's Institution
- Occupation: Businessman
- Employer: Meyer Brothers
- Spouse(s): Khatoon Meyer; Rebecca Mas'uda
- Children: 7

Sir Manasseh Meyer (1846 – 1 July 1930) was an Iraqi-born businessman, philanthropist and activist who was both a leader and benefactor of the Jewish community in Singapore.

== Biography ==
Born in Baghdad and educated in Calcutta, Manasseh Meyer came to Singapore in 1861 aged 15 and continued his English education in St Joseph's Institution. His maternal uncle Joseph Raphael Joshua had established himself in Singapore and was instrumental in bringing Manasseh and his brothers Rubin and Elias to Singapore. In 1864, he returned to Calcutta to work with his uncle in business as well as to learn literary Hebrew and Arabic. There he became a book keepers apprentice assisting his maternal uncle's business.

In 1867 aged 21 he ventured to Burma, then beyond British colonial rule, to establish business of his own. An adventurer, in his early years, Meyer was to travel across Egypt, Palestine, Iraq, Europe, India, China and Japan.

Meyer returned to Singapore in 1873 and founded his own import-export business known as Meyer Brothers involved in the opium trade. The firm grew to dominate all trade with India, linked by the two then flourishing Baghdadi Jewish communities of Calcutta and Singapore. Raphael Sassoon, a fellow Jewish pioneer born in Aleppo, was his partner in the firm and later also jointly a trustee of Maghain Avoth Synagogue on the island.

Meyer would become a major tycoon, philanthropist and was in his lifetime the recognized leader of the Baghdadi Jewish community of Singapore. Having initially built his fortune in opium, he expanded into real estate and further his fortune in property in booming colonial settlement of Singapore after the trade was ceased. He was to build the first block of flats in the city.

Meyer would both build and have in his possession of many of the most iconic buildings of the city such as Adelphi Hotel in Coleman Street and Sea View Hotel in Katong, giving his name to the road on which it stands – Meyer Boulevard. Not only was he one of the richest men in Singapore, at one point he was believed to own three-fourths of the island.

Having established himself as a tycoon Meyer than turned to philanthropy. He gave generously to charity within and without his community. His works helped lay a foundation the strength of Singapore in elite education. He began by starting the Manasseh Meyer Trust that benefited educational institutions and was one of the major donors to Raffles College, now known as National University of Singapore, and one of the two institutions of tertiary learning that later formed the University of Malaya.

Naturalized as a British citizen, he was keen to display loyalty to the British Empire and be a public citizen. Meyer was a Municipal Commissioner from 1893 to 1900 and a member of the Currency Board. He also contributed generously from his fortune towards the war effort from 1915 to 1919.

His works were within the Jewish community where he was the Baghdadi Jews of Singapore's most generous benefactor. Jews responsible for erecting Singapore's two synagogues — Maghain Aboth Synagogue and Chesed-El Synagogue. Chesed-El, his personal favourite, was opened in 1905 for the use of his family and others Baghdadi Jewish families.

Together with three other wealthy Jews, Meyer bought a large piece of land in Moulmein Road for $5,407.12 for the Jewish Cemetery. Meyer also bought the adjoining piece of land for $8,681.40 and, after reserving a plot for himself and his second wife, Rebecca Mas'uda, presented it to the community. His wife Rebecca died in 1915.

Sir Manasseh Meyer was created a Knight Bachelor on 1 March 1929 by the British for his generous contributions to society. He died on 1 July 1930 in Singapore.

== Judaism and Zionism ==
Though established in Singapore and born in Baghdad, he was part of the tightly knit transitional trade network of Baghdadi Jews in Asia united by language, family, trade and faith. However Meyer never lost his ties to the Middle East.

Meyer remained closely tied to the Jewish religious establishment in Baghdad and underwrote the publication of one of the books of Rabbi Joseph Hayyim, known as the Ben Ish Hai, to whom he looked as his spiritual mentor. Inspired by Rabbi Hayyim's focus on supporting the growing Jewish community in Palestine, he became a committed Zionist. During his lifetime the proto-Zionism of the Baghdadi religious establishment and the Ben Yish Hai was transferred into active support for the Zionist movement founded by Theodor Herzl.

In 1900 he travelled to Jerusalem with his daughters to "inculcate them with a love of Zion." In 1922 Meyer became the founding president of the Singapore Zionist Organization. His home was known as a "beehive" of Zionist activity in Asia. In 1922 he hosted Albert Einstein as he travelled through the Baghdadi Jewish communities of Asia seeking financial support for the Hebrew University of Jerusalem. Comparing him to Croesus, the ancient Greek ruler renowned for his wealth, Einstein described Meyer as such:

Croesus is still a slender, upright eighty year old man with a strong will. A small gray pointed beard, a thick reddish face, a narrow Jewish bent nose, clever, somewhat shrewd eyes, a small black cap on a well-arched forehead.

Meyer was to be one of the Hebrew University's major donors. He also supported a school and a synagogue for Baghdadi Jews in Palestine. A rabbi from Palestine would officiate to mark his funeral at the Chesed-El Synagogue.

== Legacy ==
Manasseh Meyer was survived by three sons; twins Isaac and Jacob, and Reuben, and four daughters; Hannah, Rama, Rachel and Mozelle. After his death Meyer's daughter Mozelle Nissim sponsored the creation of a school at Kfar Vitkin in then mandatory Palestine.

Meyer's legacy can still be felt in Singapore. The two synagogues continue to operate, providing the cornerstone of a thriving community. Meanwhile, Jewish educational institutions bearing his name still function.

The Sir Manasseh Meyer International School, originally named the Ganenu Learning Centre, was renamed in his honour in 2008. It is a Jewish day school that caters to children from 18 months to grade 7.

The Manasseh Meyer Building, which was constructed by Mayer in the 1920s, is currently part of the National University of Singapore's Bukit Timah campus. The building was gazetted as a national monument on 11 November 2009.

== See also ==
- History of the Jews in Singapore

== Bibliography ==
- Lee Geok Boi (2002), The Religious Monuments of Singapore, Landmark Books, ISBN 981-3065-62-1
