= Armenia–Singapore relations =

Singapore–Armenia relations
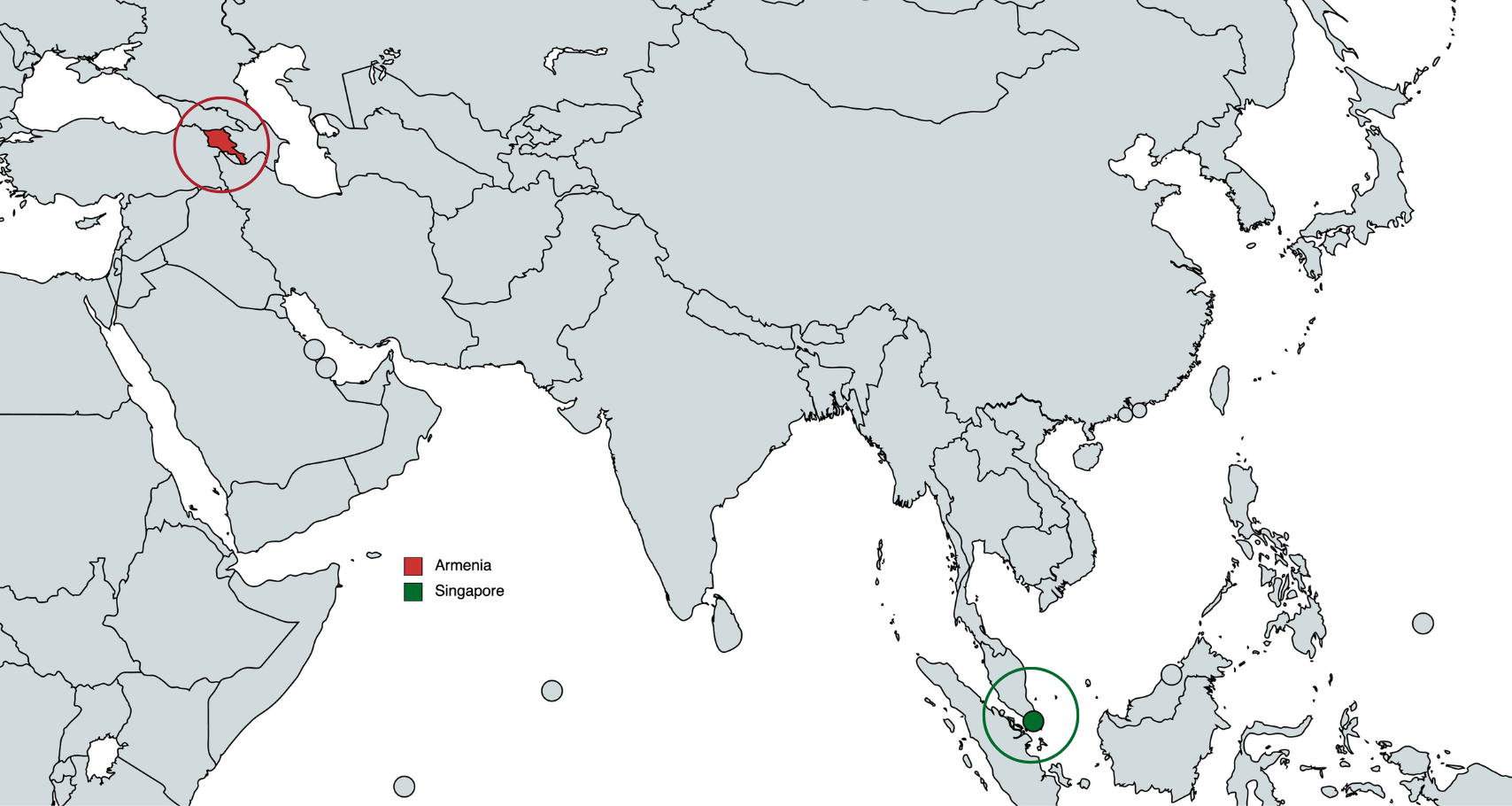

- Singapore: Armenia

Bilateral foreign relations exist between the two countries, Armenia and Singapore. Neither country has a resident ambassador. The Embassy of Armenia in Jakarta, Indonesia is accredited to Singapore. Singapore has no representation in Armenia.

== History ==
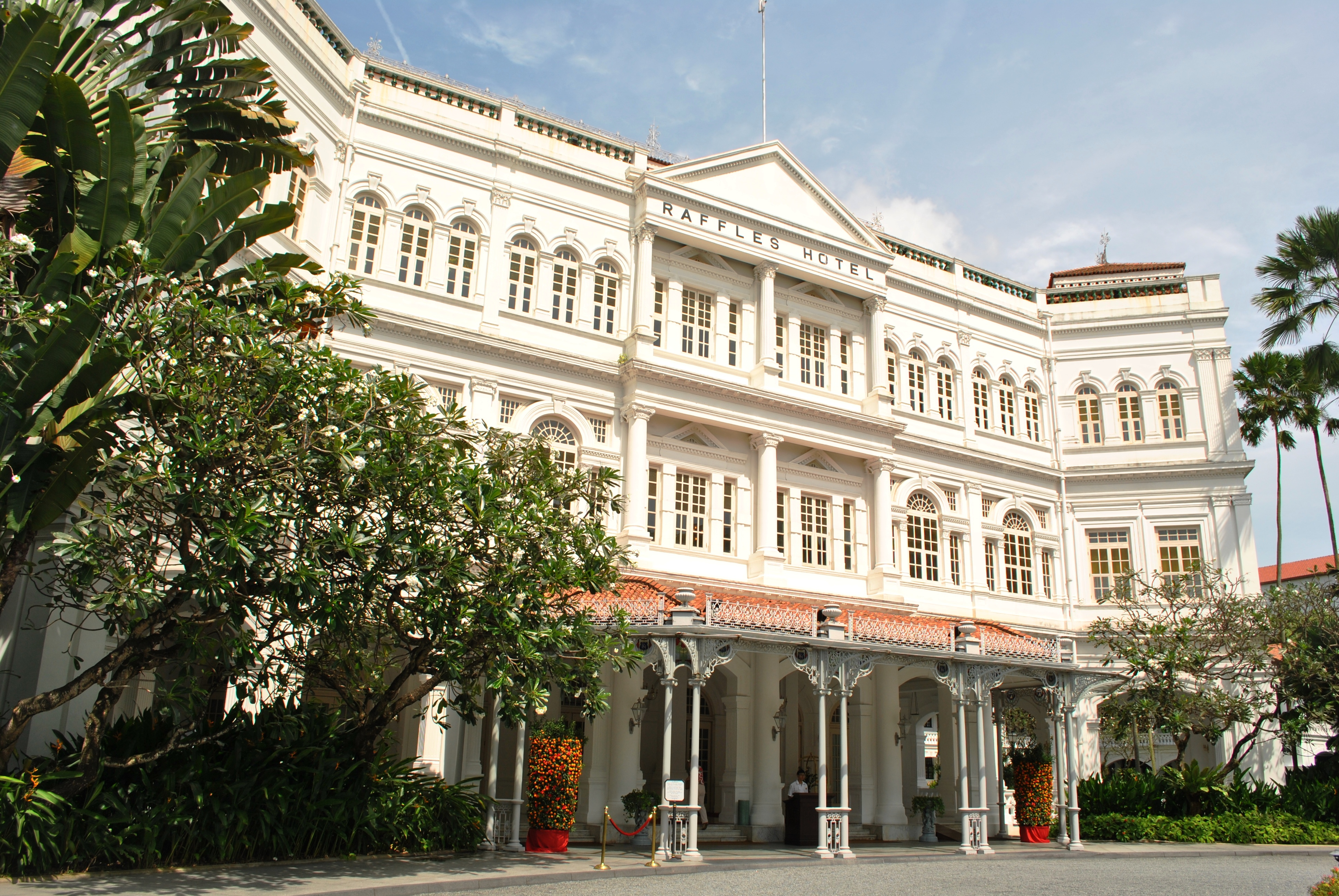
Raffles Hotel

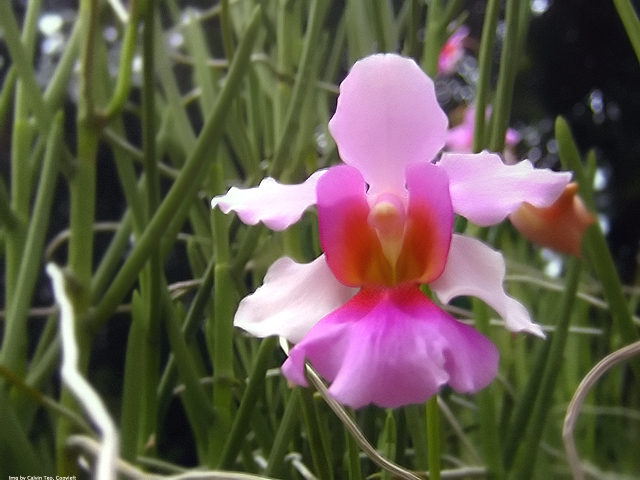
Papilionanthe Miss Joaquim

The earliest mentions of Armenians in the Malay Peninsula date back to 1669. At that time, 87 Armenians lived in Singapore. The Sarkies Brothers Martin (1852–1912), Tigran (1861–1912), Aviet (1862–1923), and Arshak (1868–1931), who moved to Singapore from Persia at the end of the 19th century, became well known in hotel business during their lifetime. It was in Penang that 23-year-old Tigran began his hotel business. After a while, he teamed up with Martin and Avet, and together they founded the Eastern & Oriental Hotel at George Town, in 1884. In 1887, the brothers also founded the Raffles Hotel in Singapore.

The current largest selling newspaper in Singapore The Straits Times, was founded by an Armenian named Catchick Moses. Another hallmark of Singapore is the hybrid orchid Vanda Miss Joaquim, which was bred by a Singaporean-Armenian named Agnes Joaquim (Ashkhen Hovakimian). In 1981, Vanda Miss Joachim has been recognized as the national flower of Singapore because of its symbol of resilience, and the ability of its people to withstand difficult times to be reborn to a better life.

The first Armenian merchant was Aristakes Sarkies, who settled in Singapore in 1820. Other merchants followed suit. Soon, 113 Armenian enterprises were already registered here, among which were dominated by a firm selling antimony and medical preparations, a dealership selling jewelry and diamonds, a network of photo studios, watch salons, law offices, a mining company, insurance funds, and restaurants.

During the Second World War, Singapore was occupied by the Japanese Empire. Many Armenians fled Singapore, and some died after being captured by the Japanese. After the end of the war, the Armenian community in Singapore shrank a lot, as most Armenians chose to move to Australia or New Zealand.

== Modern-day relations ==
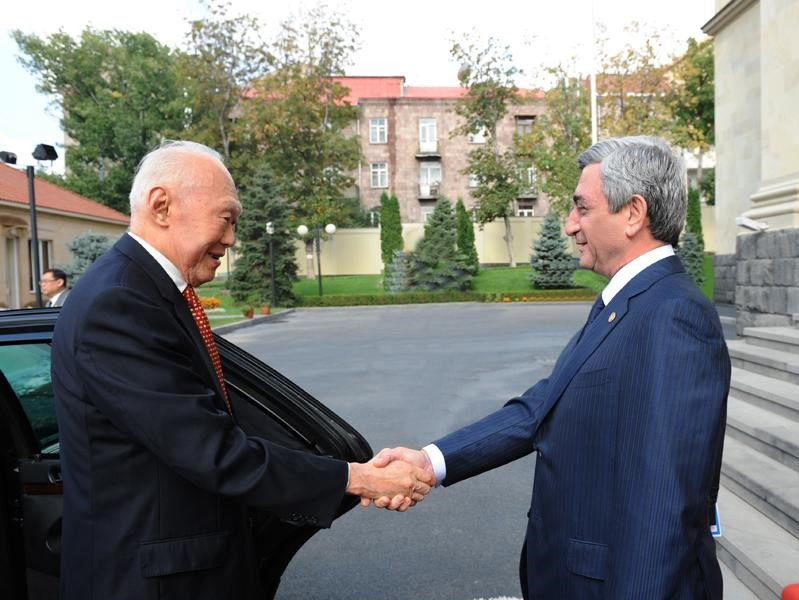
Minister Mentor of Singapore Lee Kuan Yew meets President of Armenia Serzh Sargsyan in Yerevan, 18 September 2009

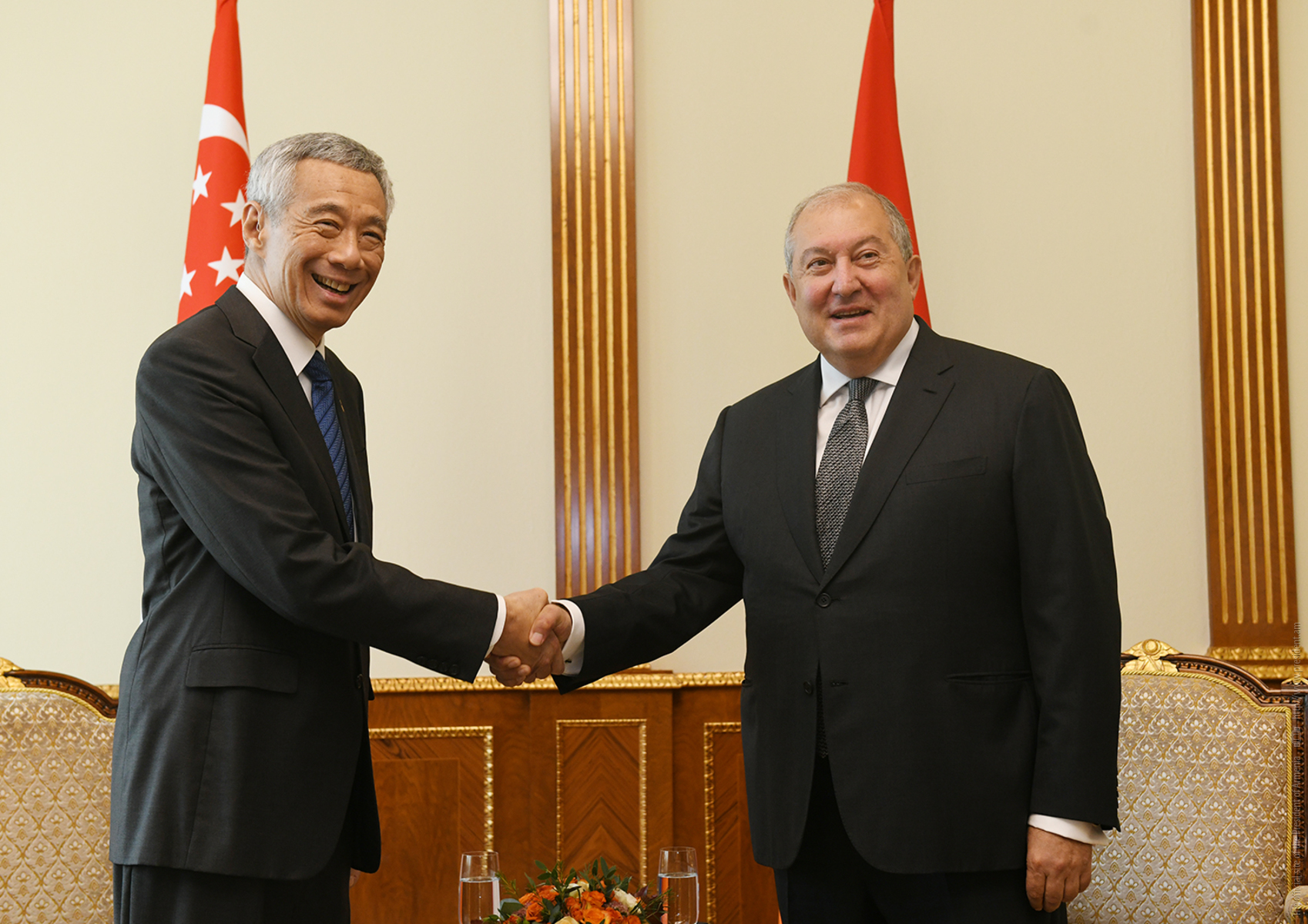
Prime Minister of Singapore Lee Hsien Loong meets President of Armenia Armen Sarkissian at the President's Residence, Yerevan, 29 September 2019

In 1965, Singapore declared independence after being expelled from the Federation of Malaya. Singapore established diplomatic relations with the Soviet Union, which Armenia was part of as Armenian SSR. On August 23, 1990, Armenia declared independence from the Soviet Union, and Singapore and Armenia established diplomatic relations on July 1, 1992.

In September 2009, Minister Mentor of Singapore Lee Kuan Yew visited Armenia, where he was received by President of Armenia Serzh Sargsyan. During his visit, Lee was awarded the Armenian state award of Order of Honor, for his contribution to the establishment and deepening of relations between the two countries.

In 2012, Sargsyan, who was then President of Armenia, visited Singapore, becoming the first Armenian head of state to visit Singapore. During the visit, Sargsyan and Prime Minister of Singapore Lee Hsien Loong reaffirmed the friendly bilateral relations and discussed ways to strengthen cooperation between the two countries. They also exchanged views on developments in their respective regions. President of Singapore Tony Tan Keng Yam and PM Lee paid tribute to the contributions made by the Armenian community to Singapore's early development. The foreign ministers of the two countries signed the MoU on Cooperation in the Field of Culture, which aims to foster greater intercultural cooperation and understanding between Armenia and Singapore, and an agreement on the terms of mutual waiver of visa requirements for holders of diplomatic and official passports.

In July 2017, an agreement was signed between Armenia and Singapore on establishing air traffic between the two countries. In March 2018, Armenia introduced a visa-free regime for citizens of Singapore.

On 7 July 2019, Armenian Prime Minister Nikol Pashinyan and his wife arrived in Singapore on an official visit. They attended the unveiling of a monument to the orchid Vanda Miss Joaquim at the Armenian Street. During this visit, an agreement on the Avoidance of Double Taxation was signed between Armenia and Singapore, as well as MoUs on strengthening cooperation in tourism and education. In order to develop tourism, the prime ministers of the two countries agreed to hold Armenian Culture Day in Singapore. On September 28, 2019, Prime Minister Lee arrived in Armenia with his wife on an official visit, where he met with Pashinyan and Armenian President Armen Sarkissian.

== Economic relations ==
In 2014, Singapore exported approximately US$13,811,100 to Armenia, while Armenia exported US$2,787,500 to Singapore. Armenia mainly exported computers, telephones and other mechanical equipment to Singapore, while Singapore's exports to Armenia included machinery, equipment, food, instruments, etc. A Singapore technology company once planned to invest in Armenia.

== Cultural relations ==
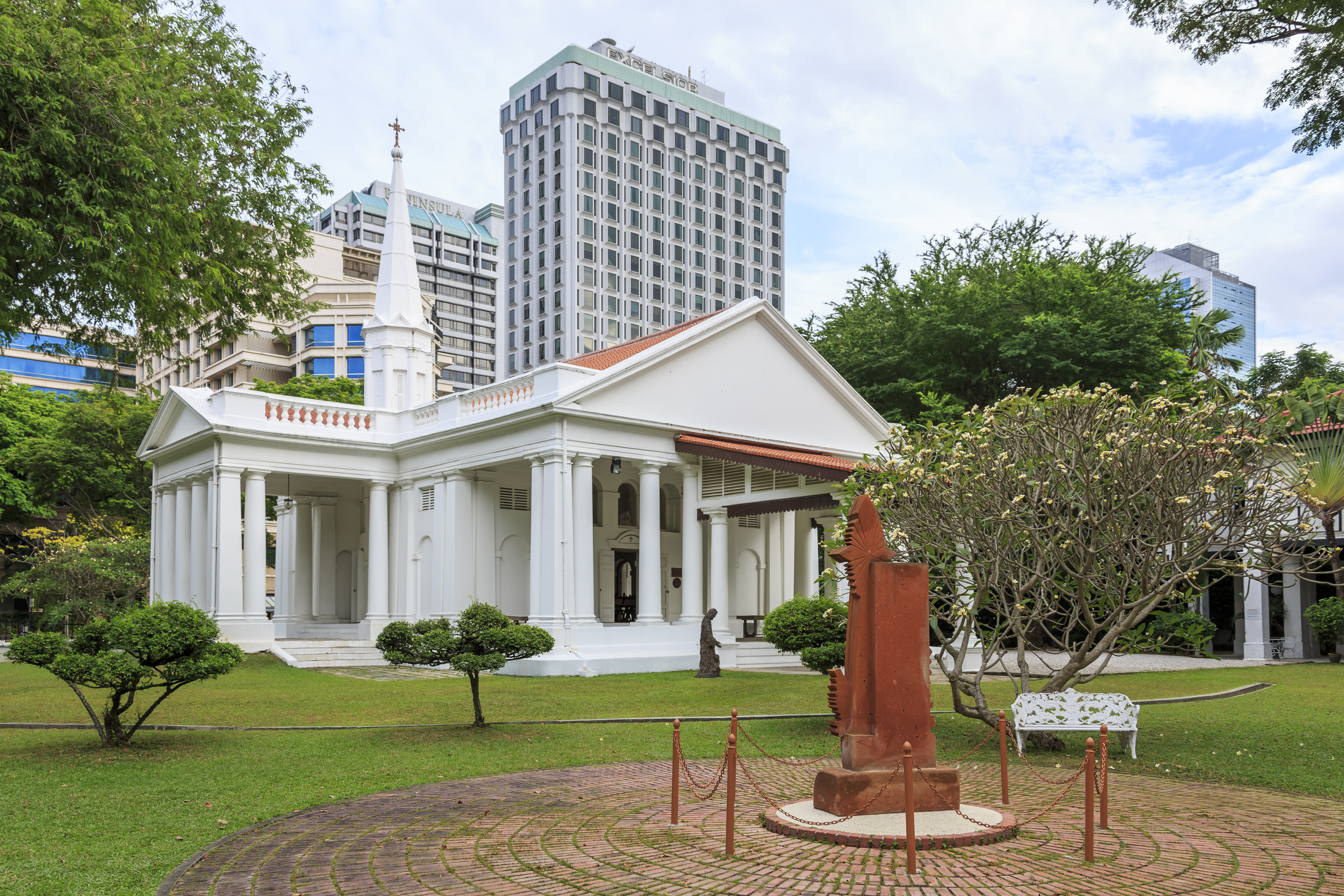
Armenian Church, Singapore

The Armenian Church is the oldest church in Singapore. It was the first building with electricity supply in Singapore, and was listed as a national monument by the Singaporean authorities in 1973. The Armenian Street, Singapore was named after the church. Many notable Armenians of Singapore were buried in the memorial garden of the Armenian Church.

In September 2014, Catholicos of All Armenians Karekin II visited Singapore. During his visit, he placed an Armenian Khachkar in front of the church, to commemorate the victims of the Armenian genocide. In 2019, it was announced that the Armenian community in Singapore will have its pastor.

== Resident diplomatic missions ==
- Armenia is accredited to Singapore from its embassy in Jakarta, Indonesia.
- Singapore is accredited to Armenia from its embassy in Moscow, Russia.

== See also ==
- Foreign relations of Armenia
- Foreign relations of Singapore
- Armenians in Singapore
