= Armenians in Singapore =

Ethnic group

Հայեր Սինգապուրում
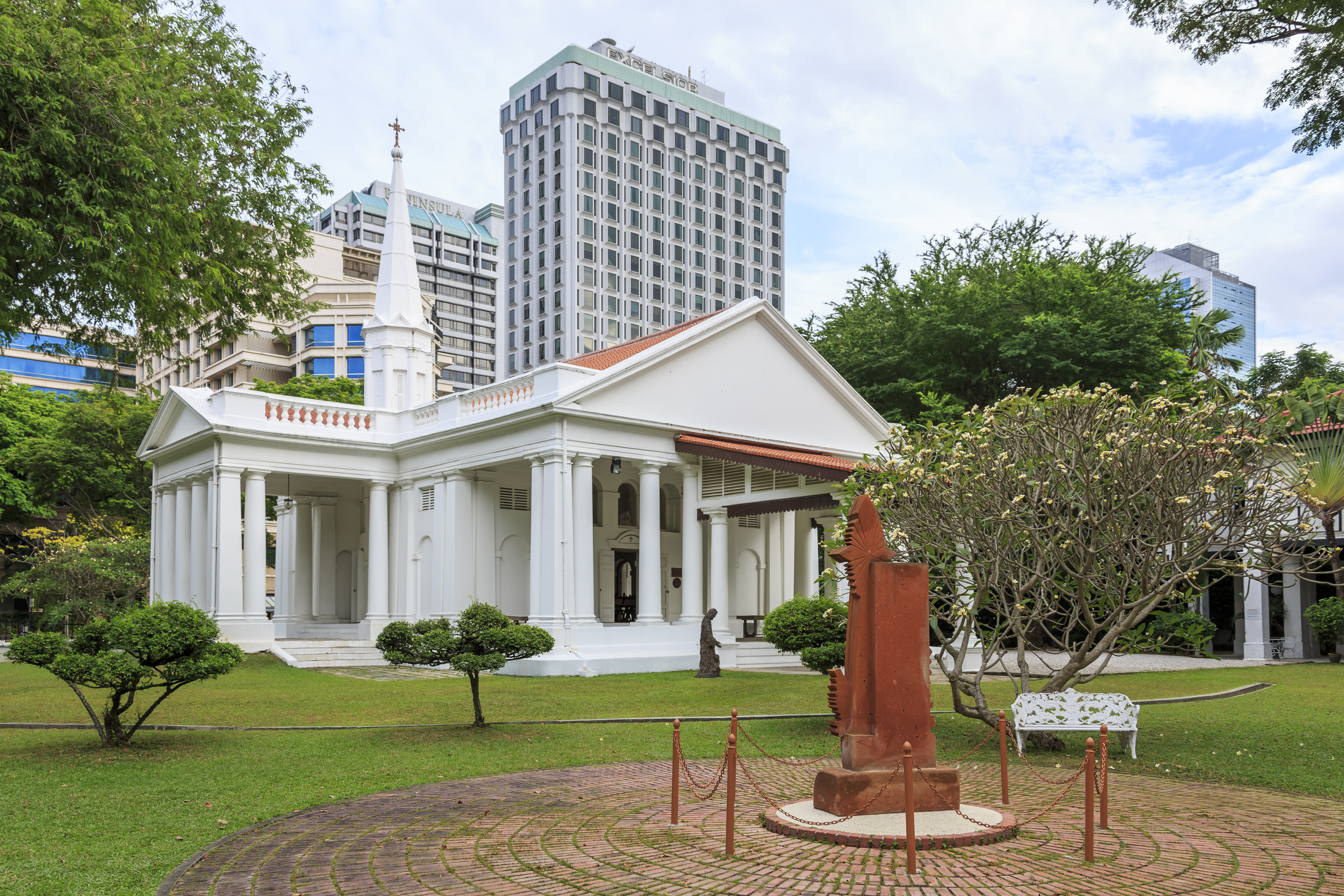
- Armenian Church, Singapore

Total population
- c. 80

Regions with significant populations
- Singapore

Languages
- Armenian, English

Religion
- Christianity

Related ethnic groups
- Armenian diaspora

The Armenians in Singapore (Armenian: Սինգապուրահայեր) are an Armenian ethnic minority that has lived and continues to live in Singapore. They were among the earliest merchants to arrive in Singapore from the British Raj when it was established as a trading port by Sir Stamford Raffles in 1819. They numbered around 100 individuals at their peak in the early 1920s, but most have moved on to other countries or become absorbed into the wider Singapore community. Despite their small number, they had an impact in the commercial life of early Singapore, and members of the community co-founded the newspaper The Straits Times and built the Raffles Hotel. The Armenian Apostolic Church of St Gregory the Illuminator on Armenian Street, the second church to be built in Singapore, is today the oldest surviving one.

== History ==
Singapore is a city-state located on islands in Southeast Asia, separated from the southern tip of the Malay Peninsula by the narrow Johor Strait. It was formerly a colony of the British Empire. The majority of Armenians arrived in Singapore during the British Raj.

=== Early history ===
The early Armenians of Singapore had their origin in Julfa (known to Armenians as Jugha), whose population were deported to Isfahan (forming New Julfa, Nor Jugha) by Shah Abbas of Persia after he captured the city in 1603. Some of these Armenians that became merchants would migrate to British Raj India and further beyond and by the 18th century, Armenian traders had established themselves in British Raj India (particularly Kolkata), Myanmar, the Malay Peninsula (particularly Penang and Malacca) and Java. Soon after Sir Stamford Raffles founded Singapore as a trading port in 1819, Armenian merchants arrived in Singapore. The first census of Singapore in 1824 showed 16 Armenians and the 1826 census showed that there were 16 male and 3 female Armenians in Singapore.

Although small in number, the Armenians were active in the commercial activity of early Singapore. Armenian trading firms such as Sarkies and Moses (1840–1914), Apcar & Stephens (1826–1845) and Mackertich M. Moses (1820s–1839) were prominent in Singapore's economy. By the 1830s, Armenian merchants began investing in land. In March 1836 the Church of St Gregory the Illuminator was consecrated, making it the second church in Singapore. As stated by The Free Press in 1836:

"This small yet elegant building does honor to the civic and religious sentiments of the Armenians of this Settlement; for we believe that only in very rare cases would such a small community have gathered enough funds to construct such a building – one of the most decorated and best-appointed examples of architecture."

There were around a hundred individuals in the early 1920s but the number declined. The 1931 census showed 81 Armenians, although actual numbers were around 95. Many of the Armenians, being British subjects, were interned by the Japanese during World War II. By the 1950s, much of the local Armenian community had emigrated to Australia or Europe or become assimilated into other larger communities of Singapore. Nevertheless, during the Feast of the Epiphany, the flags of Singapore and Armenia are still raised at the Armenian church.

== Armenians today ==
As of today, the area of compact Armenian settlement is Armenian Street. In terms of church and administrative matters, the Armenian community of Singapore is under the jurisdiction of the Catholicosate of Cilicia of the Armenian Apostolic Church, which, in turn, recognizes the spiritual leadership of the Mother See of Holy Etchmiadzin of the Armenian Apostolic Church.

On May 27, 2010, during the presentation of credentials by the Armenian ambassador to the President of Singapore, S R Nathan, the latter highlighted the special role of the Armenian community in Singapore, particularly in business and culture.

On March 27, 2011, the Armenian community of Singapore celebrated its 175th anniversary. The event, held at the Church of St. Gregory the Illuminator, was attended by 160 Armenians from 14 countries. A Divine Liturgy was conducted by an Armenian Archbishop who had come for the occasion.

The Armenian community in Singapore remains small. A dozen families in Singapore are descended from the early immigrant families: Aviet, Carapiet, Galestin, Galistan, Johannes, Moses, Sarkies, and Zechariah.

== Notable Armenians ==
Catchick Moses (Movessian) (1812-1895), was a co-founder of the Straits Times, which was to become the national English newspaper, in 1845. He sold the paper a year later because it was unprofitable.

The Sarkies brothers (Martin and Tigran) founded the Raffles Hotel, and were later joined by younger brothers Aviet and Arshak. The firm Sarkies Brothers also founded the Eastern Oriental Hotel in Penang, Malaysia and Strand Hotel in Yangon, Myanmar (previously known as Rangoon, Burma).

The brothers' cousin Arathoon Sarkies, together with Eleazor Johannes managed the Adelphi Hotel in the early 1900s. Sarkies Road is named after Arathoon's wife Regina Sarkies (née Carapiet). Their direct descendants still reside in Singapore.

Martyrose Arathoon who became a partner in Sarkies Brothers in 1917 managed Raffles Hotel during its halcyon days of the 1920s.

Agnes Joaquim (Hovakimian) born in Singapore on 7 April 1854, hybridised the orchid named Vanda Miss Joaquim by Henry Ridley. In 1899 at a flower show, Agnes unveiled the Vanda Miss Joaquim for the first time, and won the $12 first prize for her flower. As she was suffering from cancer at that time, Agnes died 3 months later at the same year, at the age of 44. In 1981, the Vanda Miss Joaquim was designated Singapore's national flower. Her tombstone stands in the Armenian Church in Singapore and reads:

In loving memory of Agnes, eldest Daughter of the late Parsick Joaquim, Born 7th April 1854 - Died 2nd July 1899,'Let her own works praise her. Nothing in my hand I bring, Simply to Thy Cross I cling'

Agnes' younger brother Joaquim P. Joaquim (1856-1902) became one of Singapore's most prominent criminal lawyers. He served as president of the Municipal Council, member of the Legislative Council, and Vice-Consul for the USA.

George Seth, born in 1877 was Solicitor-General of the Straits Settlements in the 1920s.

Emile Galistan, born 1881 was domiciled in Singapore. Galistan owned an extensive collection of orchids and was master at growing them, and he freely shared his knowledge of growing orchids with his regular contributions of articles to the Malayan Orchid Review, the journal of the Malayan Orchid Society that was founded in 1931. He was elected an honorary member of the Society in 1958. Galistan Avenue in Singapore was named after, which recognizes the work of Emile Galistan of the Singapore Improvement Trust.

Armenian expatriates in Singapore include Ashot Nadanian, who has coached the Singapore National Chess Team since 2005 Gregory Kalabekov, inventor and entrepreneur, and Gevorg Sargsyan, conductor of Singapore Camerata Chamber Orchestra and Tanglewood Music School since 2008.

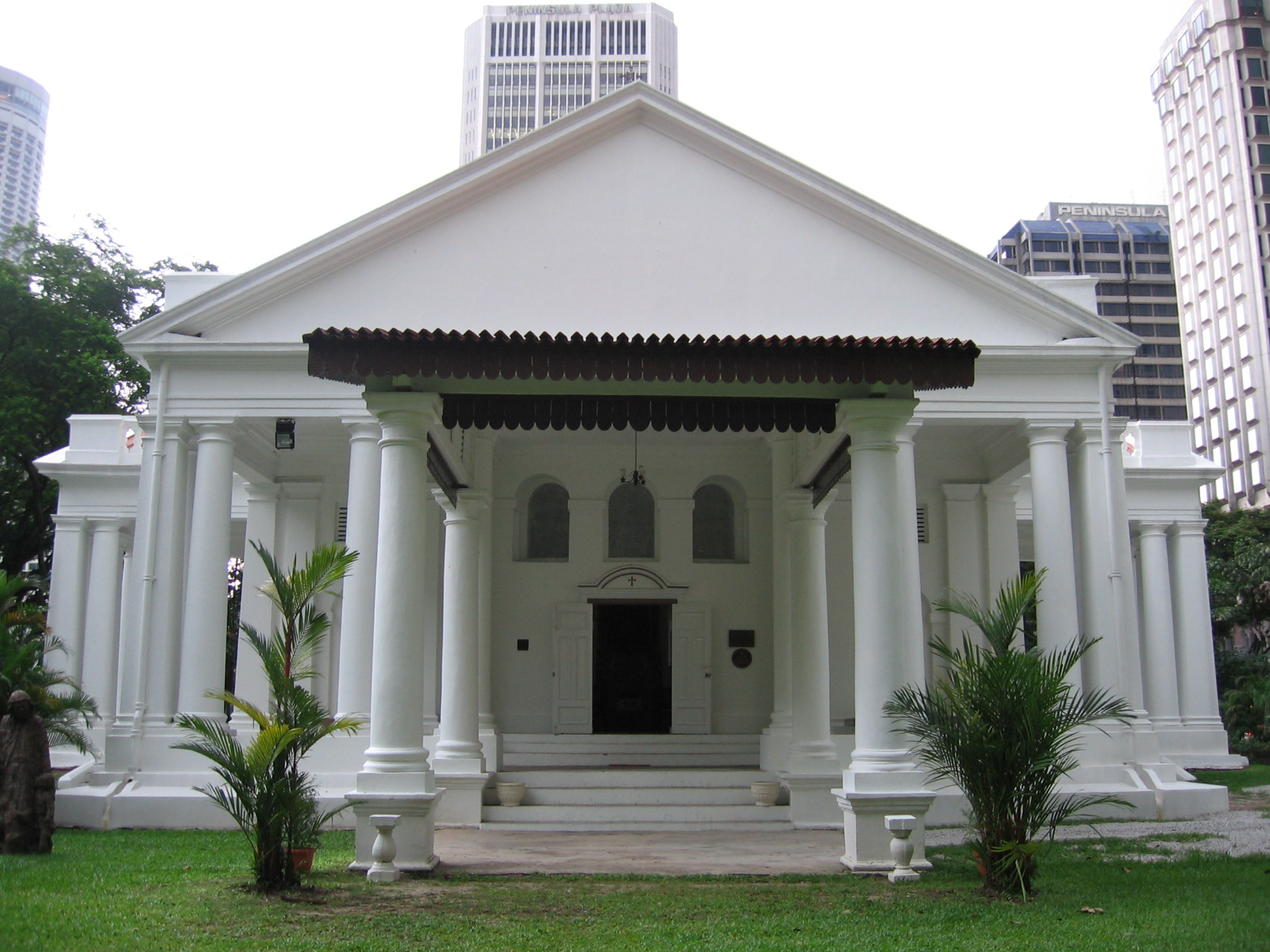
Entrance to the church

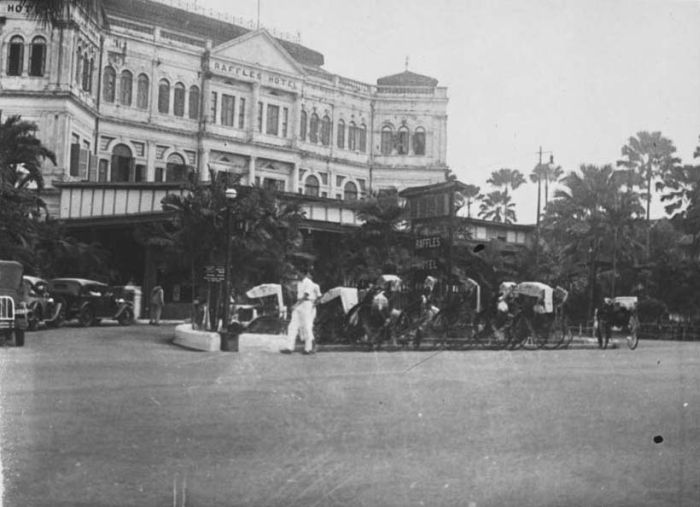
Raffles Hotel in 1932

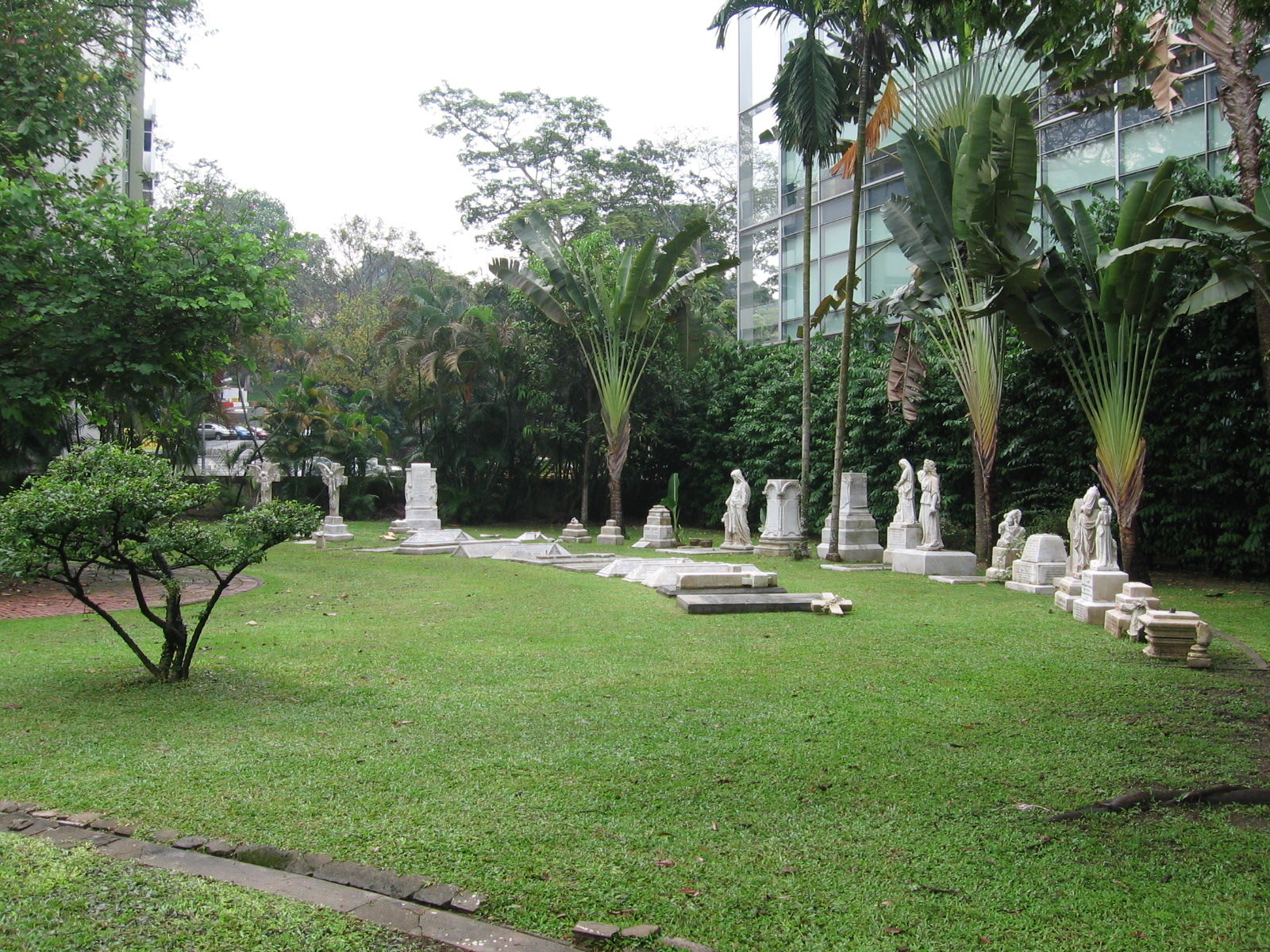
Memorial gravestones of prominent Armenians in Singapore

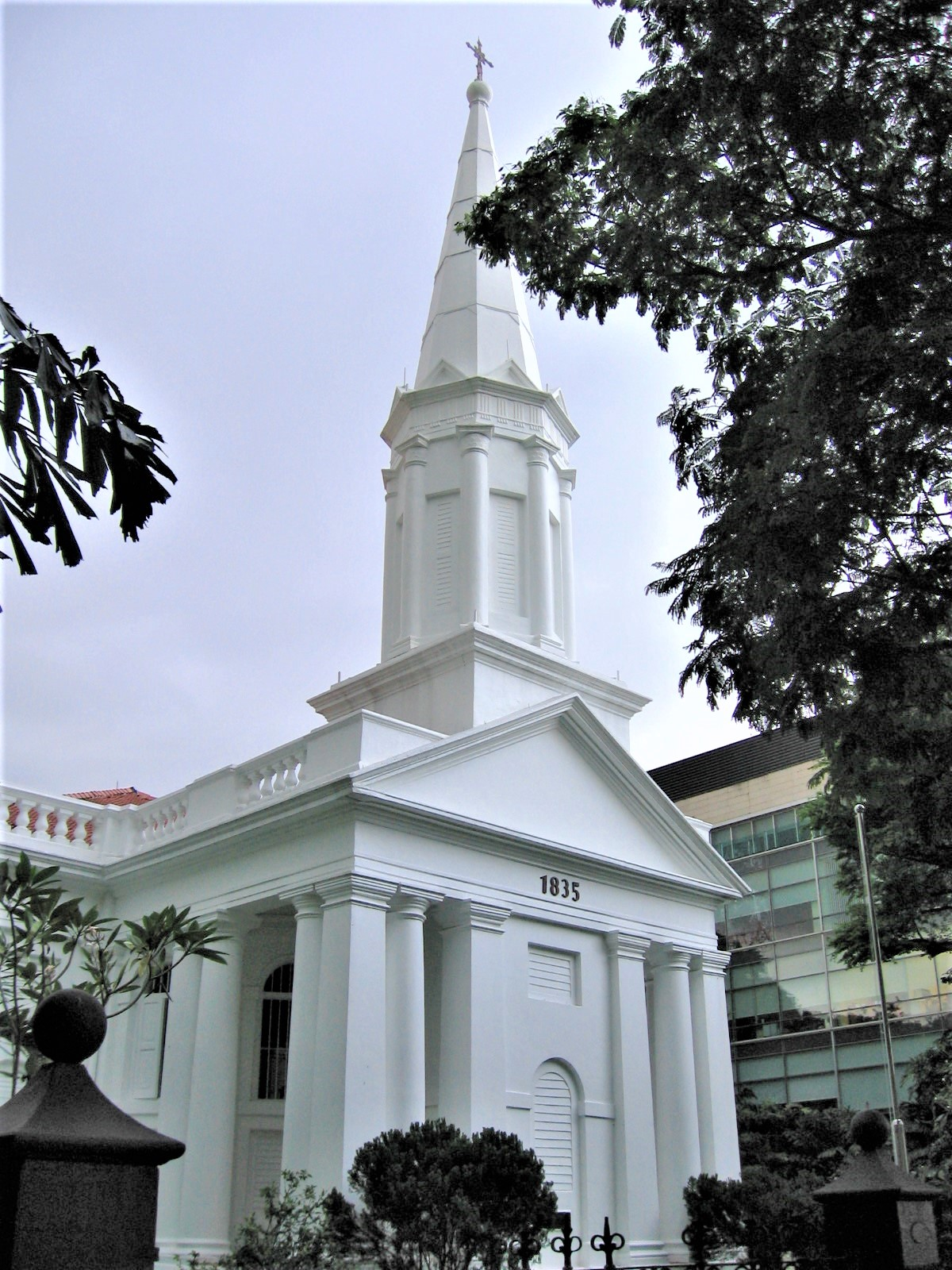

Armenian Church of Singapore

== See also ==
- Armenia–Singapore relations
- Armenian diaspora
- Armenian Church, Singapore
- Ethnic groups in Singapore
