= Gaston Dutronquoy =

French hotelier

Gaston Dutronquoy was a French hotelier, entrepreneur and photographer. He was active in Singapore from 1839 to the early 1850s. He was the first recorded resident photographer on the island.

== Early life ==
Dutronquoy was a native of Jersey.

== Career ==
He arrived in Singapore in May 1839 and advertised himself as a painter of houses and palanquins. Six months later, he opened the London Hotel in Commercial Square, which he ran with his wife. He moved the hotel to the Coleman House, the former residence of George Drumgoole Coleman, in late 1841. In the early 1840s, he arrived in Hong Kong and set up a hotel, which was also named the London Hotel, and a theatre. However, he left Hong Kong on 17 December 1842 and returned to Singapore due to "personal violence added to insult and abuse" which he claimed he had received the evening before.

He moved the hotel to a former residence of Edward Boustead at the corner of High Street and The Esplanade. He set up the Theatre Royal in the hotel's dining room with local actors enacting comedies. The theatre operated until 1845. In 1845, he opened the first photographic studio in Singapore in the London Hotel. The studio offered portrait-taking services at ten dollars for one person, and fifteen dollars for a couple. In 1851, he moved the hotel to the former residence of James Guthrie.

== Personal life and disappearance ==
Dutronquoy was married. His son, S. Dutronquoy, also became a hotelier, and opened a hotel, also named London Hotel, in 1858.

In the mid-1850s, he disappeared while searching for gold in the Muar River region. It was rumoured that he was murdered. His estate was dissolved in September 1857.
