= Coleman House, Singapore =

Defunct residence in Singapore

Coleman House
- Location within Singapore
- Former names: London Hotel; Adelphi Hotel; Hotel de la Paix; Burlington Hotel

General information
- Status: lost
- Classification: R
- Location: Singapore, 3 Coleman Street, Singapore 179804, Singapore
- Coordinates: 1°17′30.8″N 103°51′00.2″E
- Construction started: 1829
- Demolished: December 1965
- Client: Gaston Dutronquoy (former); C.A. Goymour (former); H. Kahlcke (former); Mrs Kahlcke (former); Thomas Percival Bulner (former); Tan Hiok Nee (former)
- Owner: George Drumgoole Coleman (former)
- Landlord: George Drumgoole Coleman (former)

Technical details
- Floor count: 2

Design and construction
- Architect: George Drumgoole Coleman

Coleman House was the former residence of George Drumgoole Coleman, an Irish architect and Singapore's First Superintendent of Public Works. Construction started in 1823. The building was demolished in December 1965 to make way for the Peninsula Hotel in 1971.

== History ==
The house was built by Coleman in 1829, with three large bedrooms and a total area of 14,500 square feet (1,350 m^{2}). Following Coleman's departure of Singapore due to an illness, the building was leased off to French hotelier Gaston Dutronquoy, who relocated the London Hotel to the house, and turned the dining room in to the Theatre Royal. The hotel was frequented by Joseph Conrad during his visits to Singapore. The building was turned into the Hotel de la Paix in 1856, and became the personal residence of Teochew businessman Tan Hiok Nee in the 1880s. The house was later converted into the Burlington Hotel, and served as a hotel or boarding house during World War II. The house was later leased off to shopkeepers who lived upstairs.

The Singapore government offered to buy the house in 1955 for redevelopment. The building was demolished in 1965, with over a thousand squatters occupying the building prior to its demolition, and was replaced by the Peninsula Hotel and Shopping Centre.
