= Armenian Khachkar =

Sculpture in Denver, Colorado, U.S.

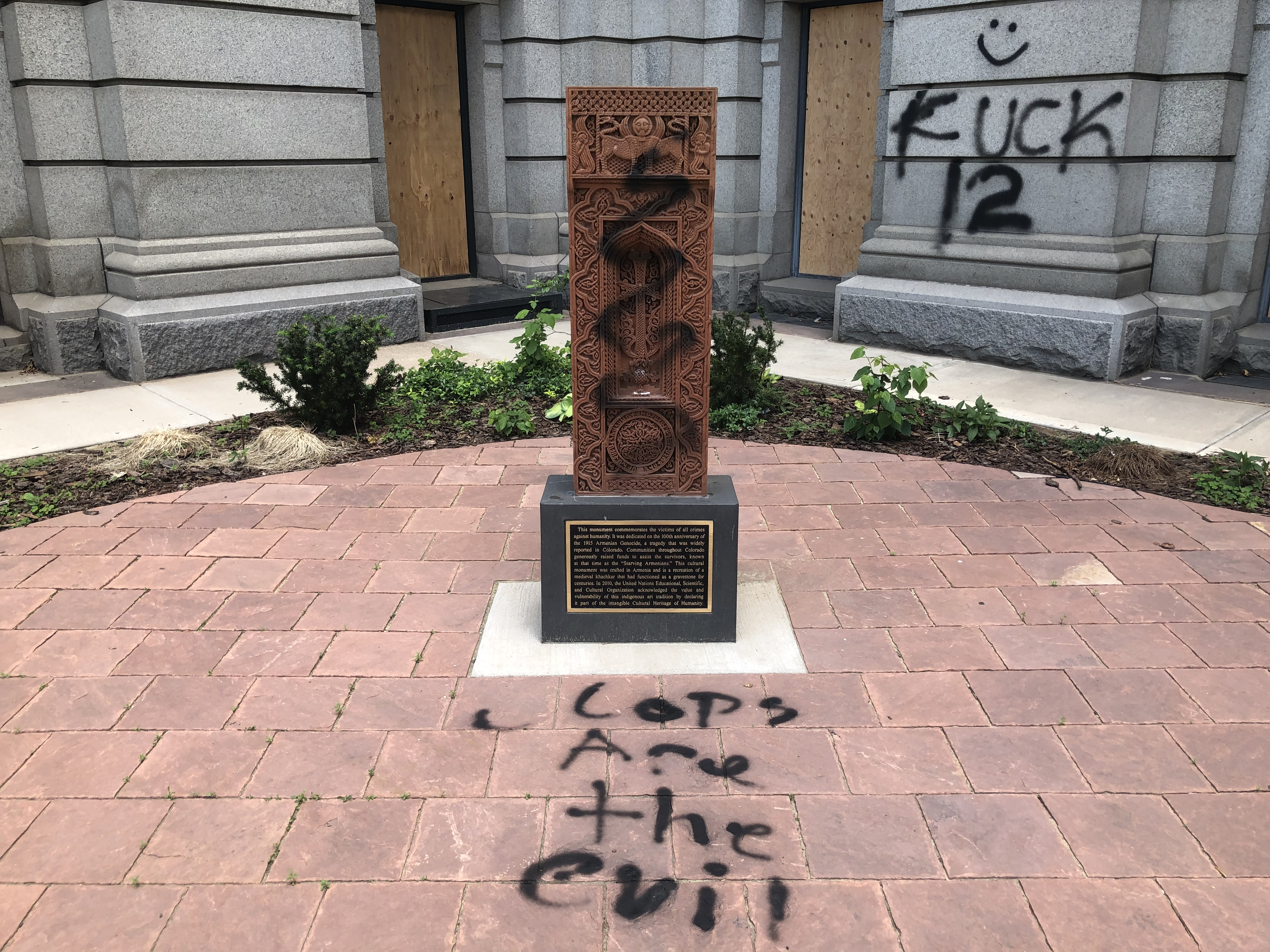
- The memorial in 2020
- Interactive map of Armenian Khachkar
- Location: Colorado State Capitol, Denver, Colorado, U.S.
- Coordinates: 39°44′22″N 104°59′4.4″W
- Type: Khachkar
- Dedicated date: 2015
- Dedicated to: Victims of genocide

The Armenian Khachkar is a khachkar and monument dedicated to the victims of genocide, installed outside the Colorado State Capitol, in Denver. The memorial was dedicated in 2015. It was defaced in May 2020 as part of the George Floyd protests.
