= Armenian Church, Singapore =

Armenian church

Armenian Church of Saint Gregory the Illuminator
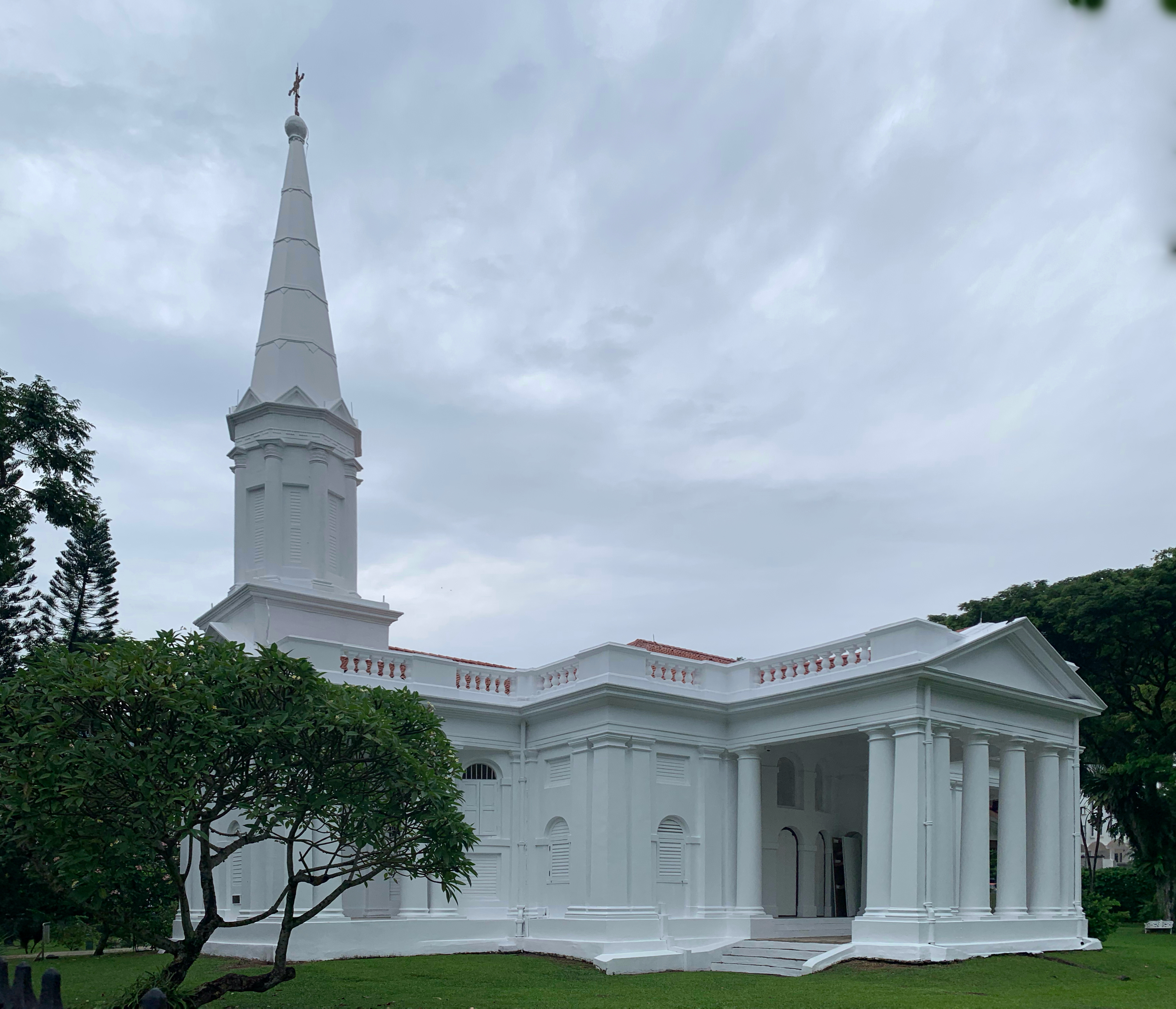

- Location within Singapore

Religion
- Affiliation: Armenian Apostolic Church
- Rite: Armenian Rite
- Patron: St. Gregory the Illuminator
- Year consecrated: 1836

Location
- Location: 60 Hill Street, Singapore
- Country: Singapore
- Interactive map of Armenian Church of Saint Gregory the Illuminator
- Coordinates: 1°17′35″N 103°50′57.5″E

Architecture
- Architect: George Drumgoole Coleman
- Style: Neoclassical
- Groundbreaking: 1834
- Completed: 1835
- Construction cost: 5,058 Spanish dollars
- Designated as NHL

National monument of Singapore
- Designated: 6 July 1973; 53 years ago
- Reference no.: 2

The Armenian Church of Saint Gregory the Illuminator, referred to locally as the Armenian Church, is the oldest surviving Christian church in Singapore, located at Hill Street in the Museum Planning Area, within the Central Area. The church was completed in 1835 and consecrated the next year. Originally a parish of the Armenian Apostolic Church, an Oriental Orthodox denomination, the last Armenian parish priest left in the late 1930s as the Armenian population in Singapore dwindled. It was designated as a national monument in 1973. Armenian and Oriental Orthodox services are now regularly held at the church.

== History ==
=== Foundation and early history ===
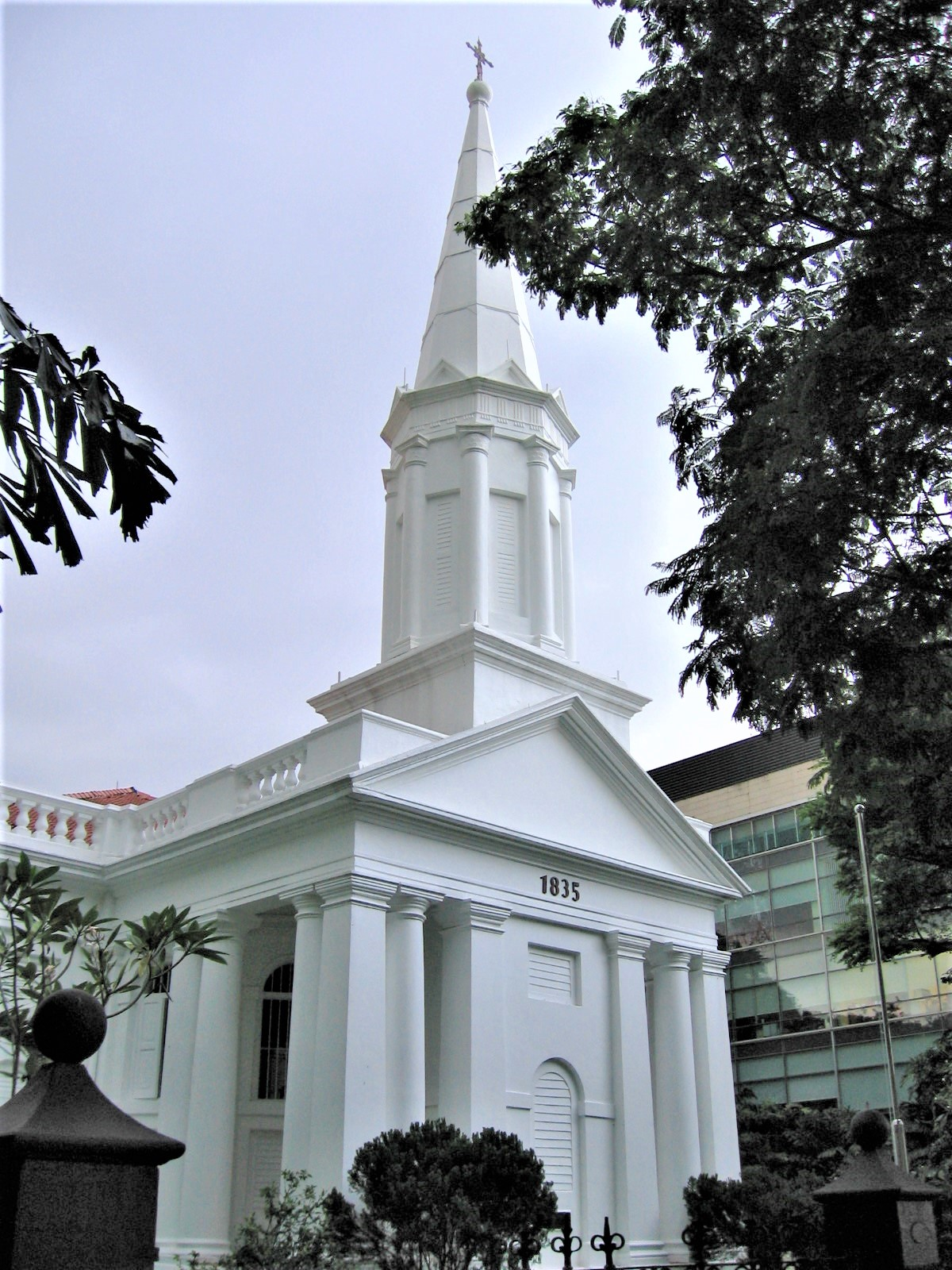
The east front of the church has a bowed apse with a pediment supporting a spire. The inscribed date "1835" commemorates the year the church's foundation was laid.

The church was commissioned by the first twelve Armenian families who settled in Singapore. It was designed by George Drumgoole Coleman, the architect of many of Singapore's early buildings who also became the first Superintendent of Public Works. The church is dedicated to St Gregory the Illuminator, the first Patriarch of the Armenian Church.

The Armenians were among the earliest merchants and traders to arrive in Singapore after Sir Stamford Raffles established it as a trading port in 1819. The community already held religious services in Singapore by 1821, and the first priest, the Reverend Krikor Hovhannes (Gregory John), arrived in July 1827. A temporary chapel was set up at the back of John Little & Company at Commercial Square (today's Raffles Place). The community started to raise funds for the construction of a new church in 1827. Over half the construction cost of 5,058.30 Spanish dollars was donated by the Armenian community in Singapore, with the rest coming from Armenians in Java and India, and a small portion from European and Chinese merchants in Singapore. The Armenian community was very small – the 1824 census counted only 16 members, and 34 in 1836 when the church opened – its contribution to the Armenian Church was therefore considerable in proportion, an indication of the prosperity and religious devotion of the Armenians.

A request for land to build the church was made by the Armenian community in 1833, and the government granted the land at the foot of Fort Canning in 1834. The foundation stone was laid on 1 January 1835 by the Supreme, Archimandrite Reverend Thomas Gregorian, who also opened and consecrated the new church on Easter Sunday in 1836. He was assisted by Reverend Khachig Hovhannes, the priest for the local community. It is the oldest surviving Christian church built in Singapore.

The church has undergone a few modifications since it was first built. A bell turret designed by Coleman was deemed structurally unsound, and it was replaced first by a square tower in 1847, then again replaced in 1853 with the spire as it appears today, which was designed by George Maddock.

In 1905, a two-storey bungalow was built in 1905 by Nanajan Sarkies in memory of her late husband, John Shanazar Sarkies.

In 1909, the church became the first building in Singapore with electricity.

=== Later history ===
The Armenian population in Singapore dwindled and the last Armenian parish priest left in the late 1930s.

In the late 1960s, when the Christian Cemetery at Fort Canning was cleared for a park, early Armenian tombstones there were moved into the Memorial Garden at the church ground. Tombstones from Bukit Timah-Cavenagh Road cemetery were also moved here. A number of tombstones of prominent Armenians in Singapore, such as members of the Sarkies family of Raffles Hotel fame, Agnes Joaquim who bred Singapore's national flower and Catchick Moses who founded the newspaper Straits Times, are placed here. The Memorial Garden however was never used as a burial ground.

Armenian Street is named after the church and it was known earlier by its Chinese name seng poh sin chu au meaning "the back of Seng Poh's new building" (Tan Seng Poh was the first Chinese to serve on the Municipal Commission).

The Armenian Church was gazetted as a national monument on 6 July 1973.

On 17 September 1979 vardapet Daron Djerejian, an Armenian priest from Nice, France, visited the church and conducted a Divine Liturgy. At that point, the church had been abandoned religiously for decades. In 1985 the Armenian Church celebrated the 150th anniversary of the church. Archbishop Aghan Baliozian, the primate of the diocese of Australia, led a group of Armenian pilgrims from Australia, the Philippines, Hong Kong, Thailand, Japan, and San Francisco, U.S. to Singapore in June 1985.

=== Current usage ===
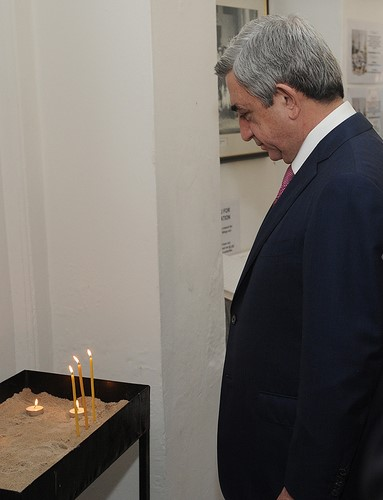
President of Armenia Serzh Sargsyan inside the church, during his state visit to Singapore (2012)

Divine Liturgy was performed at the church in 2001, on the occasion of the 1700th anniversary of adoption of Christianity as a state religion of Armenia. On 27 March 2011 some 160 Armenians from 20 countries gathered at the church to commemorate the 175th anniversary of the church.

On 29 March 2016 by the Pontifical Order of Karekin II, Supreme Patriarch and Catholicos of All Armenians, Fr. Zaven Yazichyan, a member of the Brotherhood of Holy Etchmiadzin, was appointed to serve as the Pastor of the Armenian Spiritual Pastorates of Singapore, Myanmar and Dhaka. Yazichyan, who is based in Yangon, Myanmar, visited Singapore five or six times a year to serve mass. Yazichyan was moved to be an assistant to the Grand Sacristan of the Mother See of Holy Etchmiadzin on 7 September 2017. Currently, visiting clergy from other countries occasionally preside over the Divine Liturgy (Holy Badarak/Patarag), including Fr. Movses Sargsyan from Armenian College and Philanthropic Academy and Davidian Girls’ School in Kolkata before the severe outbreak of COVID-19 in Singapore during the years of 2019 and 2020 and Archbishop Haigazoun Najarian (Primate of the Armenian Diocese of Australia and New Zealand) in 2018 and after the decline of COVID-19, most recently on 12 January 2025.

On 20 May 2016 the church received a grant from the government of Singapore for restoration, which was still ongoing as of February 2017. In May 2018, the Armenian Heritage Gallery opened (visits only by appointment), featuring artifacts and other items collected from community archives in Singapore and elsewhere, sometimes also displaying traveling exhibits. There is currently an Armenian Community Centre in construction as an extension of the parsonage building built in 1905. Its completion is expected by mid-2025, completing the Singapore Armenian Heritage Centre, the first integrated Armenian cultural and heritage centre in Asia, comprising the Armenian Church Memorial Gardens and the Stations of the Cross outside in addition to the Armenian Community Centre and the Armenian Heritage Gallery.

The small Coptic Orthodox community in Singapore occasionally hold services in the building. The St. Mark Coptic Orthodox Church celebrates Holy Mass on the first Saturday evening and Sunday morning of each month. Additionally, the Saint Flannán Mission conducts Divine Liturgy at the church (previously 2nd and 4th Thursdays at 7p.m., currently first Thursday of each month), and the Taizé Community holds regular prayers on Saturday evenings of every other month. Armenian lessons also take place on Sundays from 12 to 1:30 p.m. for children 2 to 14 years of age.

== Architecture ==
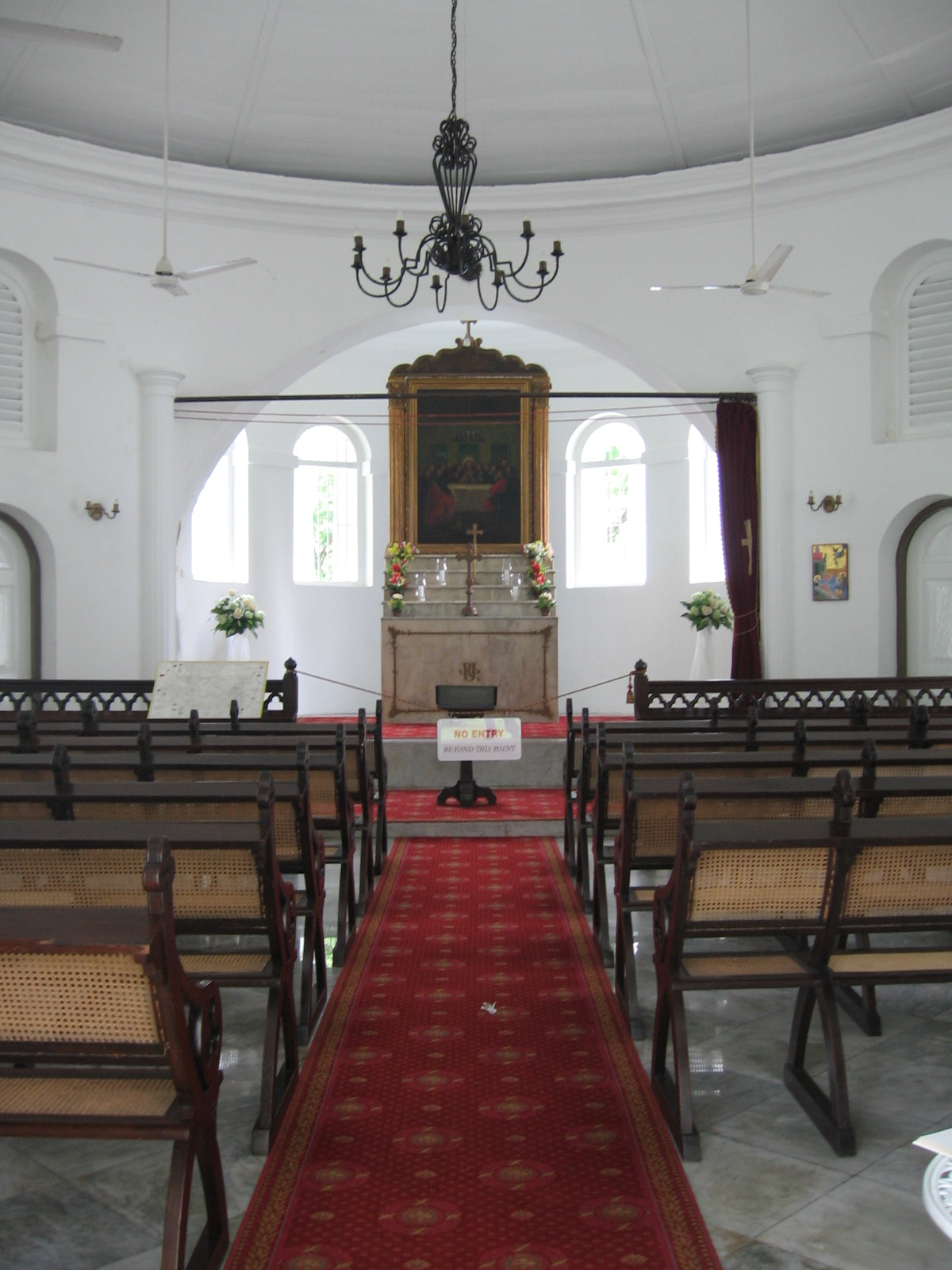
The church's interior showing the altar and nave

The existing Armenian Church, built primarily in the British neoclassical style with a few eclectic influences, is centrally-designed in the manner of the Etchmiadzin Cathedral, the mother church of Armenia. The church interior is circular, and said to resemble the round Holy Sepulchre in Cambridge, England. The circle however is imposed within a square-cross plan, with projecting square porticos in Roman Doric orders. The Palladian-style design may have been inspired by the circular plan for St Andrews's Church in Chennai, which is in turn derived from one of James Gibbs' designs for St Martin-in-the-Fields in London that was published in his Book of Architecture.

The original symmetrical design by Coleman included neither tower nor spire, instead it featured an octagonal cone supporting a small bell turret with Ionic columns. The current spire, designed by an English architect George Maddock, is the second to replace the original bell turret by Coleman. The original was first replaced in 1846 by a square tower with Doric pilasters. In 1853, the square tower was replaced by present spire that sits on an octagonal tower, and topped with a ball and cross. Maddock had the pitched roof replaced by the present one and, to support the tower and spire, added the east portico around the apse where the chancel is. The semi-circular chancel with the raised grand altar is located opposite the main entrance. Probably at the same time the main entrance on the west portico was also widened.

The Tuscan Doric porticos on the north, south and west fronts of the church are each topped with a triangular pediment. Originally the east front simply had a bowed apse with Tuscan Doric pilasters, however the bowed apse has since been boxed in by the portico on which the spire was built. The pediment on this portico is inscribed the date "1835", the year of the church's foundation. The north, south and west porticos were designed to allow horse carriages to pull into the porches, where ladies may then alight and step directly into the church without soiling their dresses.

Coleman's design is adapted to suit Singapore's tropical climate; for instance, the wide verandahs give shade and protect the timber-louvred windows on the ground floor from heavy downpours. The windows, in turn, diffuse the sunlight and induce cross ventilation. The pews are backed with woven rattan, a lighter, cooler and more comfortable material.

Located within the church ground are the Memorial Garden and the parsonage, a two-storey bungalow built in 1905 by Nanajan Sarkies in memory of her late husband, John Shanazar Sarkies.

== Gallery ==
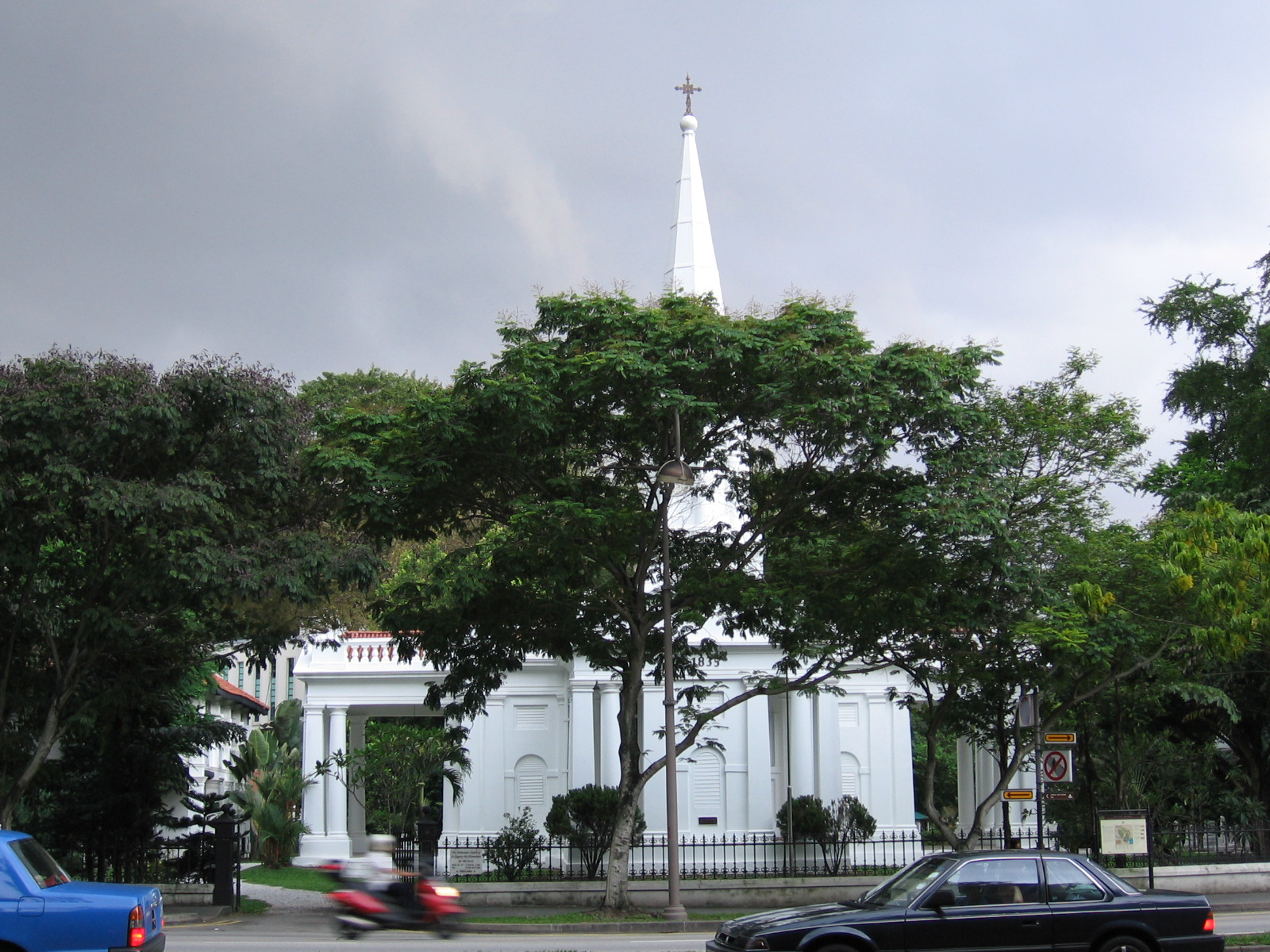
A view from across the church

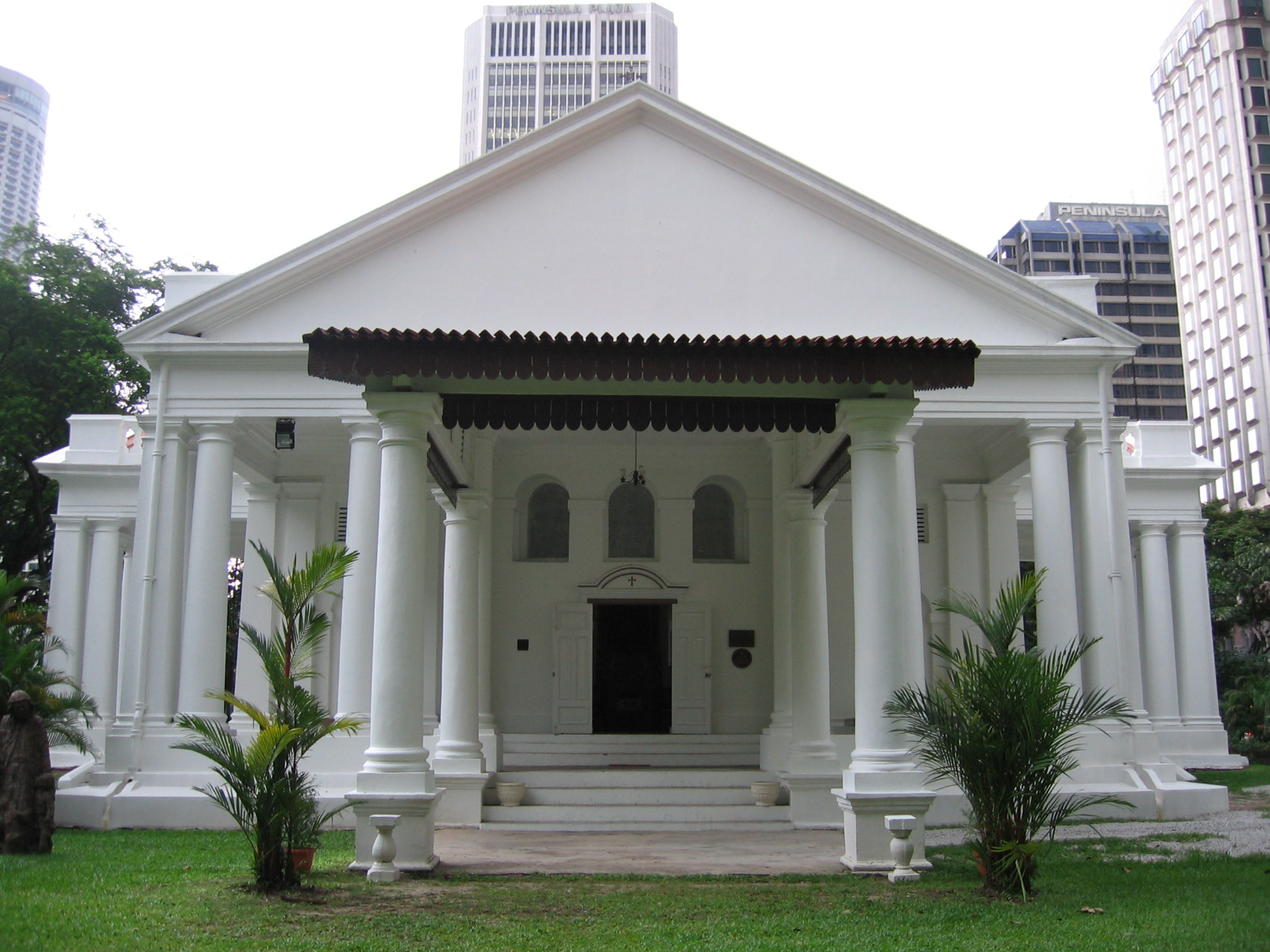
The church's entrance features heavy two-leaf timber doors framed by moulded semi-circular pediments.

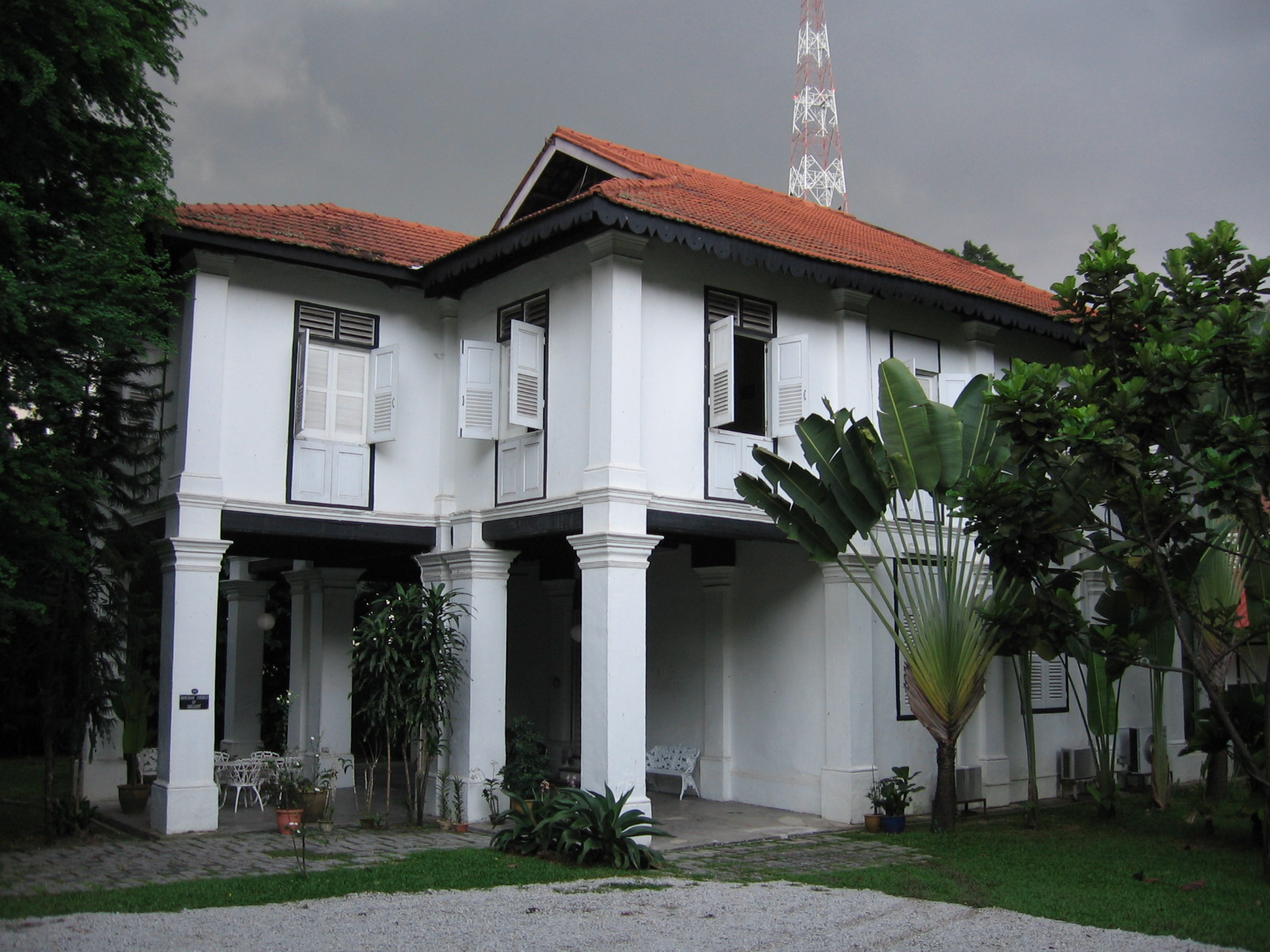
The parsonage on the church grounds, built in 1905 by Nanajan Sarkies in memory of her late husband, John Shanazar Sarkies.

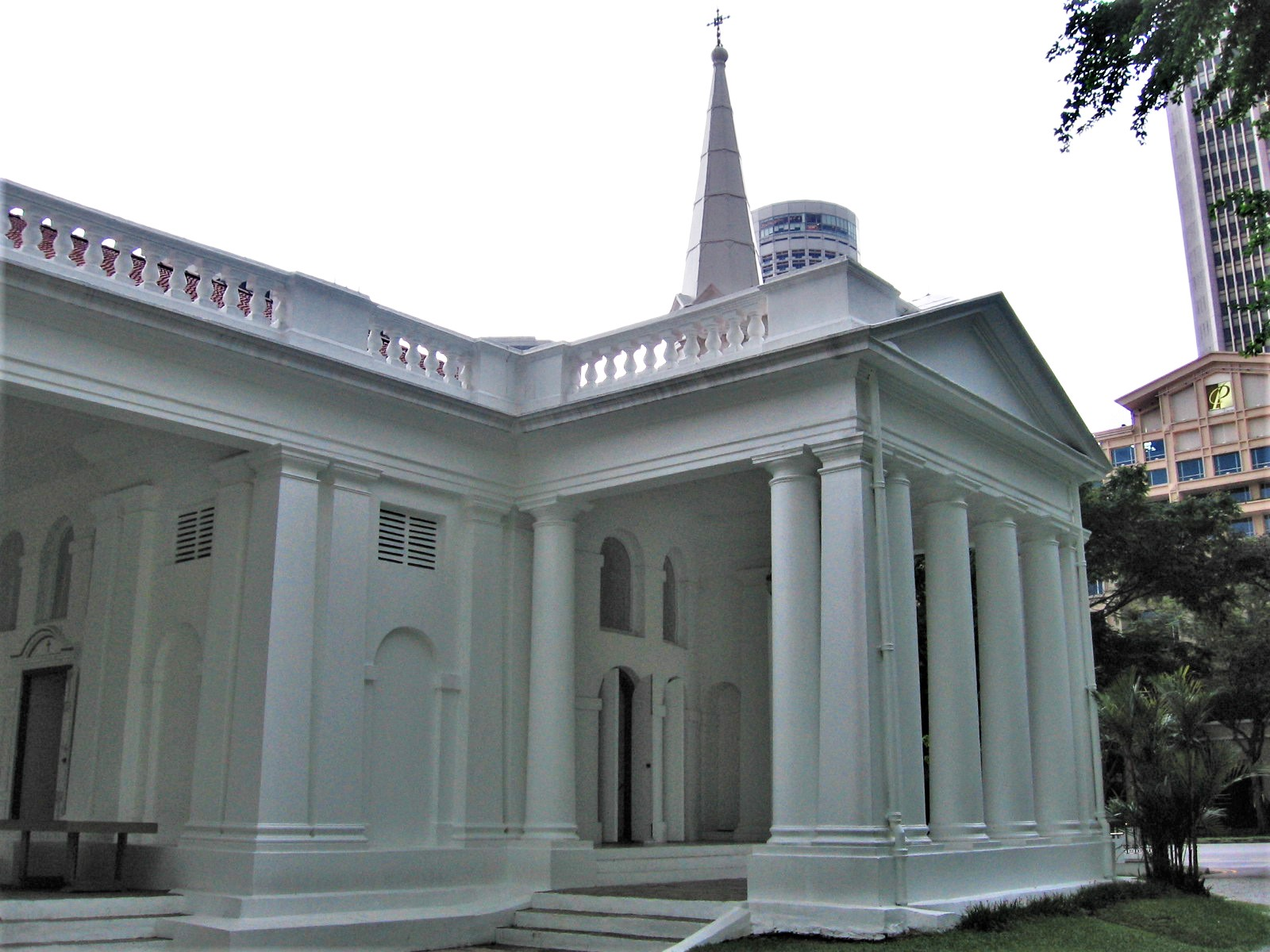
Tuscan Doric porticos capped with triangular pediments feature on the south front of the church.

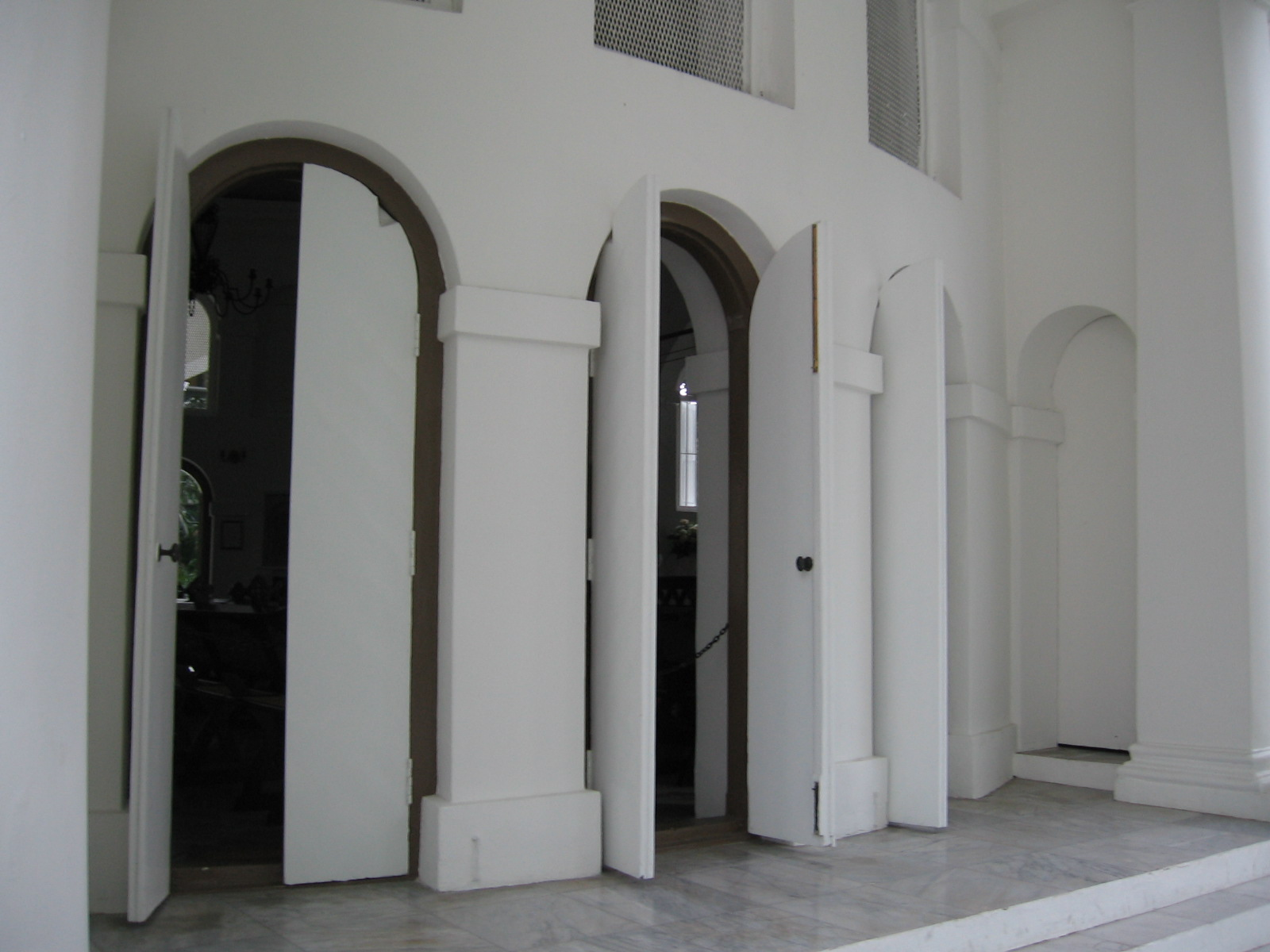
Three two-leaf timber doors lead into the southern entrance of the church.

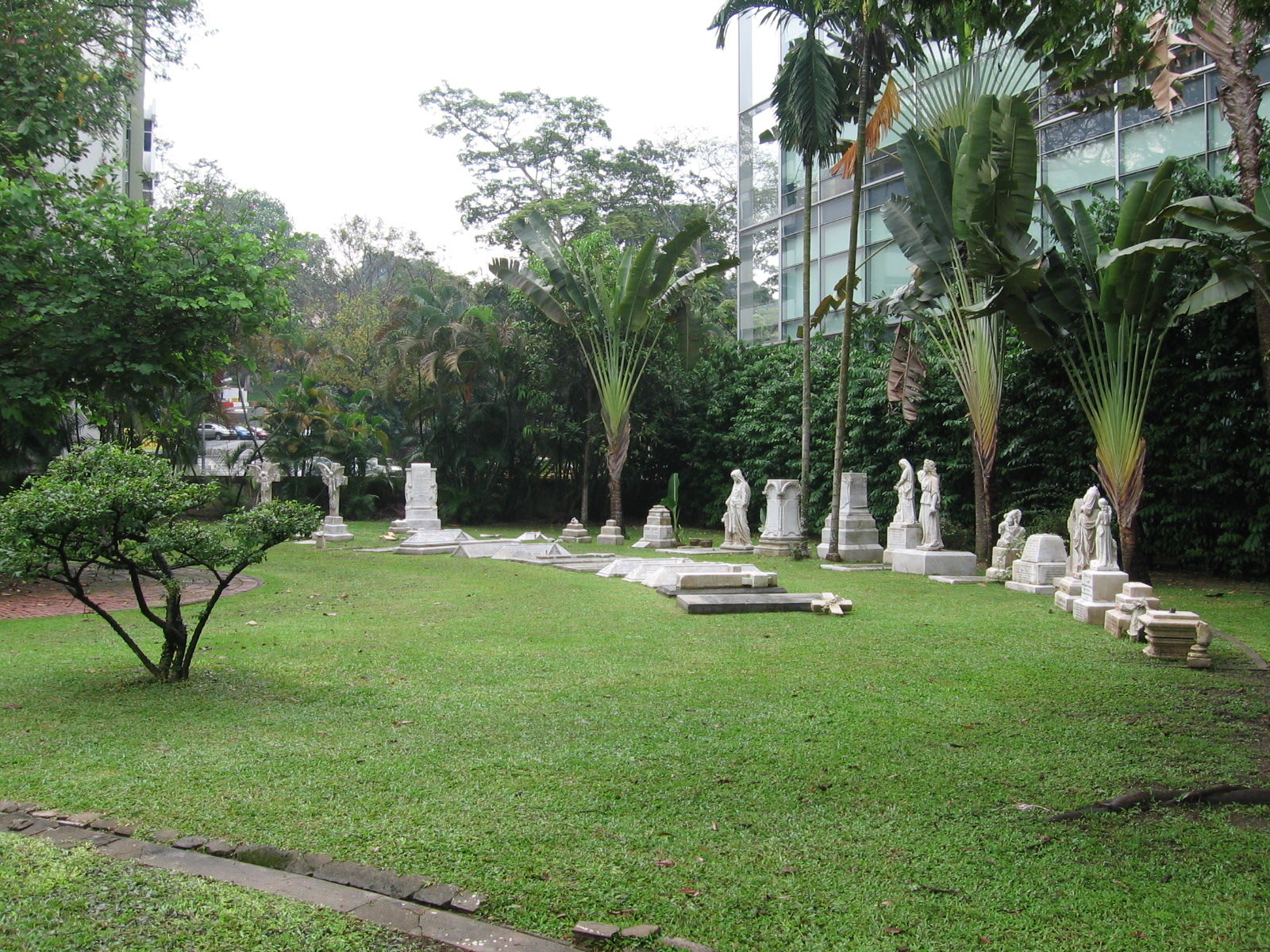
The Memorial Garden to Armenians.

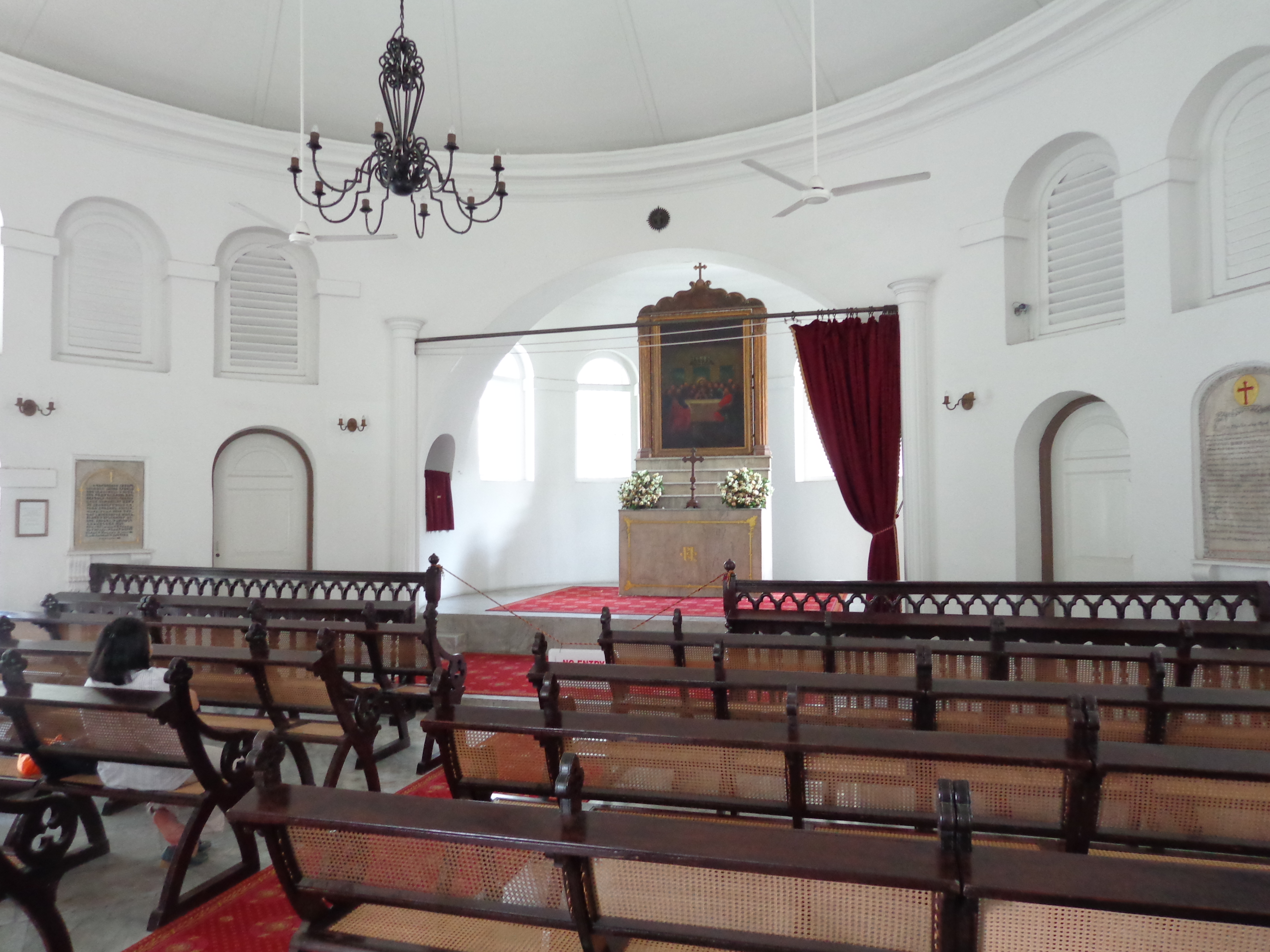
Altar and pews

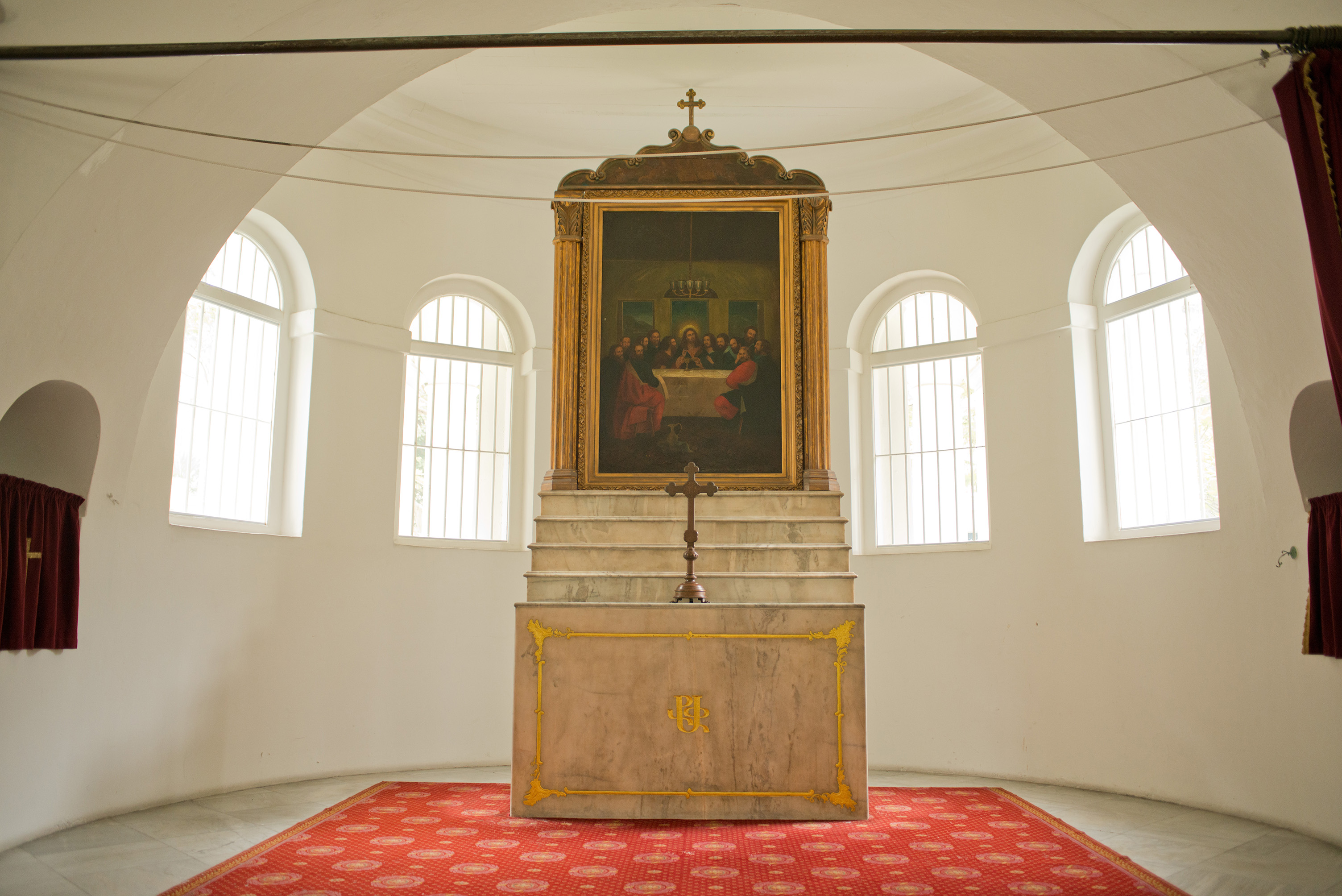
Interior of Armenian Church showing the altar

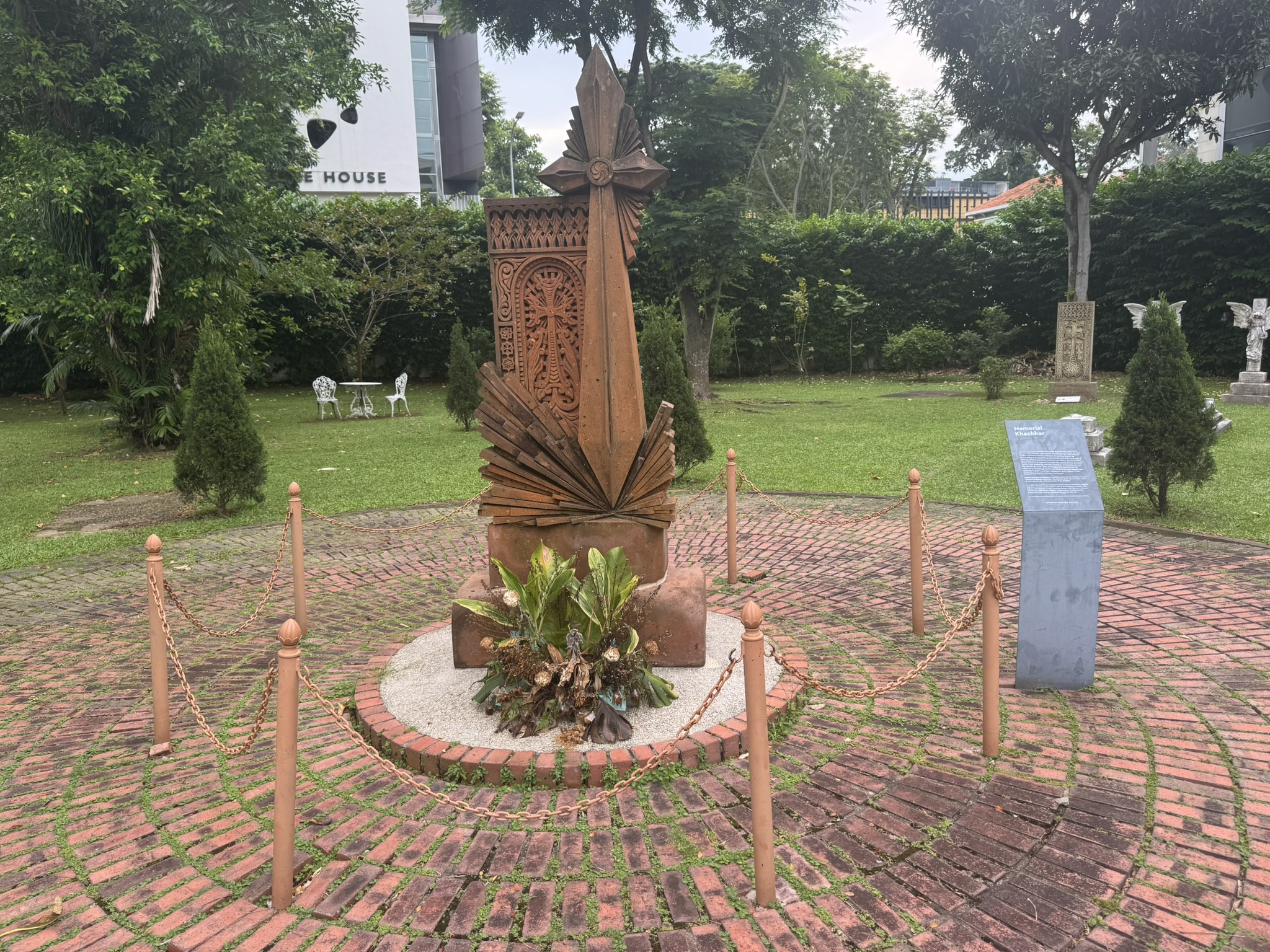
Memorial khachkar dedicated to the 100th anniversary of the Armenian genocide located on the grounds of the church

== See also ==
- Armenians in Singapore
