= Kartika Wijaya =

Kartika Wijaya Hotel
- Interactive map of the Kartika Wijaya Hotel area

General information
- Location: Batu, East Java, Indonesia, Jl. Panglima Sudirman 127
- Coordinates: 7°52′01″S 112°30′40″E
- Year built: 1891
- Inaugurated: November 18, 1986

Website
- https://batu.el-hotels.com/

The Kartika Wijaya, currently branded as éL Hotel Kartika Wijaya Batu, operated by éL Hotel Group, an Indonesian hotel management company established in 2013, is a colonial-style hotel located in Batu, East Java.

== History ==
Originally known as Jambe Dawe, the building was originally constructed in 1891 as a vacation villa for Martin Sarkies, one of the Armenian Sarkies Brothers, who were also the founders of the Raffles Hotel in Singapore and the Eastern & Oriental Hotel in Penang. During the Japanese occupation of the Dutch East Indies, the building was used as a Japanese army basecamp and an armory, while during the subsequent Indonesian National Revolution, it became an Indonesian army base and soup kitchen before briefly reverting to Dutch control.

The building was renamed Kartika Wijaya and opened as a hotel on November 18, 1986. The hotel has 115 rooms and its interior is decorated in Art Deco style with Javanese accents.
