= Penicillium georgiense =

Scientific classification
- Domain: Eukaryota
- Kingdom: Fungi
- Division: Ascomycota
- Class: Eurotiomycetes
- Order: Eurotiales
- Family: Aspergillaceae
- Genus: Penicillium
- Species: P. georgiense

Binomial name
- Penicillium georgiense Peterson, S.W.; Horn, B.W. 2009

Species of fungus

Penicillium georgiense is a species of the genus of Penicillium which was isolated from soil of a sandy beach from the Batu Ferringhi beach on the Penang Island in Malaysia and it was also isolated soil of a peanut field in Georgia in the United States.
