= Greg Chako =

American jazz guitarist and composer

- Born: June 12, 1958 (age 68); Cincinnati, Ohio, U.S.
- Genres: Jazz, Latin jazz, world jazz, hard bop, bossa nova
- Occupations: Musician, composer, arranger, educator, bandleader
- Instrument: Guitar
- Years active: 1980–present
- Labels: Raining Music / Mint 400 Records; Chako Productions
- Website: gregchako.com

Greg Chako (born June 12, 1958) is an American jazz guitarist and composer. He released multiple albums as a bandleader and performed in the United States and Asia, including extended periods in Hong Kong, Singapore, Shanghai, and Japan. His work has been featured in publications such as The Straits Times, The Business Times, the Hong Kong Standard, and the Cincinnati Enquirer.

== Early life and education ==
Chako was born in Cincinnati, Ohio. He began studying music at age nine and initially played accordion before switching to guitar. After one year of guitar study he placed second in a national competition organized by the American Guild of Music.

He later attended the Berklee College of Music, where he studied performance and was named to the Dean's List. During this period he performed with musicians including Junior Cook, Bill Hardman, Bobby Watson, Othello Molineaux, and Jimmy Raney.

Chako later completed undergraduate and graduate studies in music and business and was admitted to the Doctor of Musical Arts program at the Eastman School of Music.

== Career ==
=== Cincinnati ===
During the mid-1980s Chako performed at jazz venues in Cincinnati. He also worked as resident guitarist and booking coordinator at Doc's Place, a jazz club covered in local publications.

=== Hong Kong (1992–1994) ===
In 1992 Chako moved to Hong Kong. During this period he performed in productions including West Side Story and appeared with the Hong Kong Philharmonic Orchestra. He also performed in hotel venues and led small ensembles.

His first album, Everything I Love, was recorded live in Hong Kong.

=== Singapore (1994–2002) ===
Chako relocated to Singapore in 1994. He founded Chako Productions Pte Ltd, a company providing live music for hotels and corporate events.

He performed regularly at venues including the Raffles Hotel, Marina Mandarin, Pan Pacific Singapore, and the Conrad International.

In 2000 The Business Times published a feature on Chako and his ensemble Integration in connection with the album Integration.

A profile in The Expat Magazine discussed his work and career in Singapore.

=== Shanghai (2002–2003) ===
Chako later moved to Shanghai, where he led a house band at the Westin Bund Center. Local media coverage discussed his performances with the group during this period.

=== Japan (2003–2009) ===
From 2003 to 2009 Chako lived in Japan, performing primarily in Tokyo and Yokohama. A profile in the Japanese publication Jazz Guitar Book discussed his international career and development as a guitarist.

=== Return to the United States ===
After returning to the United States, Chako continued performing and recording.

In 2022 Mint 400 Records and Raining Music reissued several recordings from his catalog, including a remastered edition of Integration.

His recordings have been reviewed in publications including Jazz Journal, Cadence Magazine, Jazz Guitar Today, and Jazz Weekly.

== Musical style ==
Chako's recordings incorporate elements of hard bop, modal jazz, and Latin jazz.

== Documentary ==
Chako is the subject of the documentary film An American Cat in the Lion City, which follows his life and work as a jazz musician in Singapore and Hong Kong.

== Awards and honors ==
- Inducted into the Cincinnati Jazz Hall of Fame, Class of 2025.

== Discography ==
- Everything I Love (1994)
- Sudden Impact (1996)
- Live at Raffles (1998)
- Integration (2000)
- Integration II (2001)
- Where We Find Ourselves (2005)
- Two’s Company, Three’s a Crowd (2006)
- Paint a Picture, Tell a Story (2007)
- My World on Six Strings (2013)
- Everybody’s Got a Name (2021)
- Friends, Old & New (2022)
- Tokyo Live! (2023)
- A Place For Bass: Chamber Jazz Duets (2023)
- Yokohama Live! (2023)
- Christmas Time (2023)
- Standard Roots (2024)
- Greg Chako Live! (2024)
- Life After 40 (2024)
- The Miami Project (2025)
- Comfort Food (2025)
- Merry Christmas From Greg Chako (2025)
- Come To Sorrento's (2026)
