= Sarkies Brothers =

Armenian brothers born in Iran

The Sarkies brothers
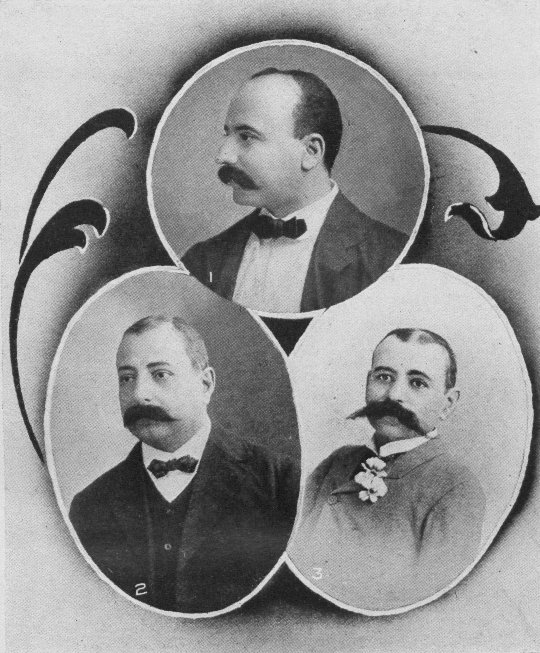
- Clockwise from top: Arshak, Tigran and Aviet Sarkies
- Born: Isfahan, Qajar Iran
- Occupation: Hoteliers
- Years active: 1884–1931
- Known for: Founding the Raffles Hotel, Eastern & Oriental Hotel and the Strand Hotel.

The Sarkies Brothers, Martin (1852–1912), Tigran (1861–1912), Aviet (1862–1923), and Arshak (1868–1931), were a group of brothers of Armenian ethnicity best known for founding a chain of luxury hotels throughout Southeast Asia. The brothers were born in Isfahan, Iran.

== History ==
The 23-year-old Tigran opened the Eastern Hotel (now Eastern & Oriental Hotel) in George Town, Penang on 15 April 1884. The brothers went on to found several hotels in the region, including the Raffles Hotel in Singapore, and the Strand Hotel in Rangoon (Yangon).

Arshak, the last of the brothers, died on 9 January 1931. On 10 June of the same year, a bankruptcy case was filed against the Raffles Hotel, eventually resulting in the Sarkies family losing control of their hotels.

The Sarkies name still lives on in Singapore through the namesake Sarkies Road. However, the road was named after Regina Sarkies (née Carapiet), the wife of Arathoon Sarkies, who was a cousin of the brothers and fellow hotelier. In addition, Sarkies Corner, the coffee shop in the Eastern & Oriental Hotel, is named after the brothers. Arathoon's descendants continue to reside in Singapore.

== Hotels ==
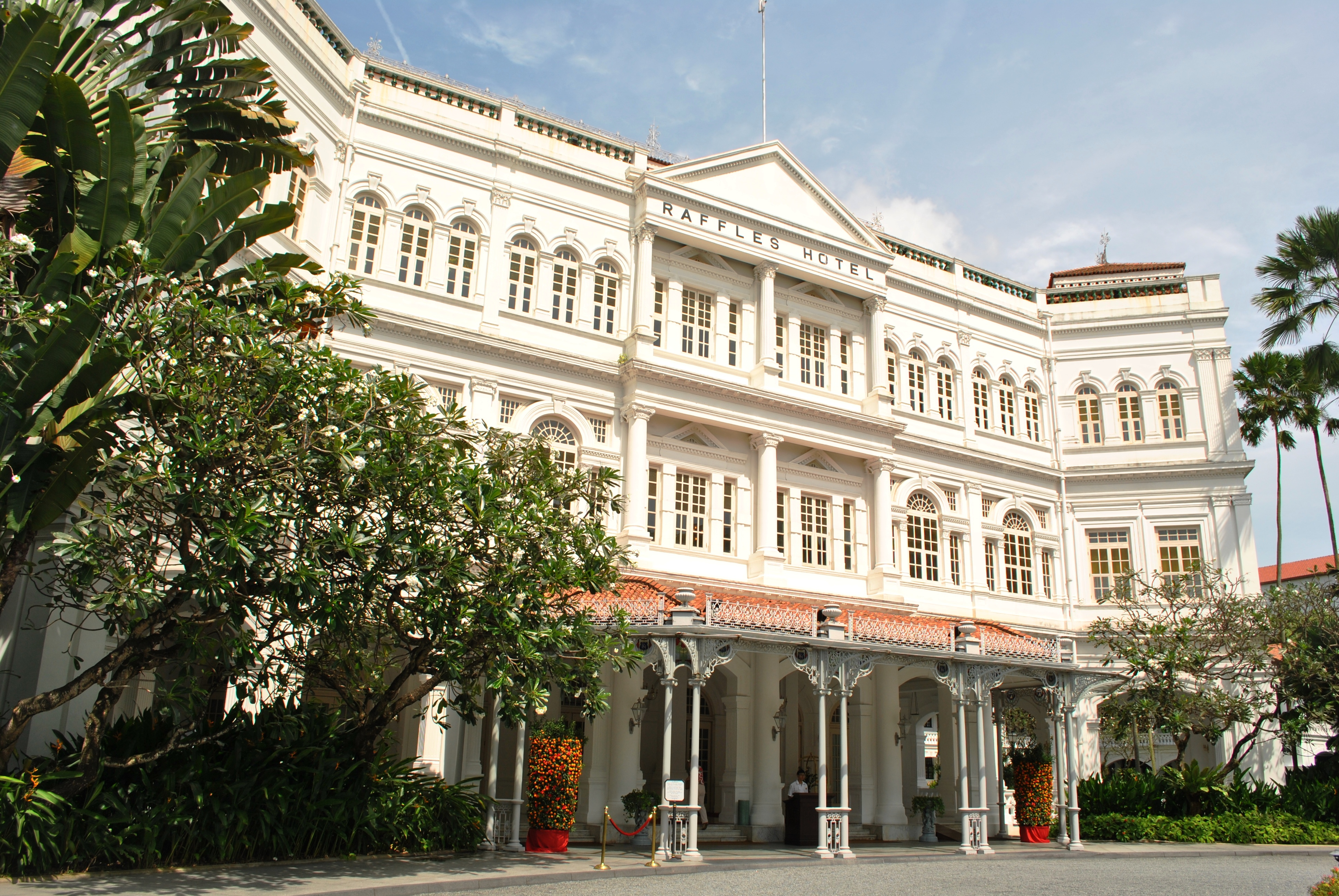
Raffles Hotel

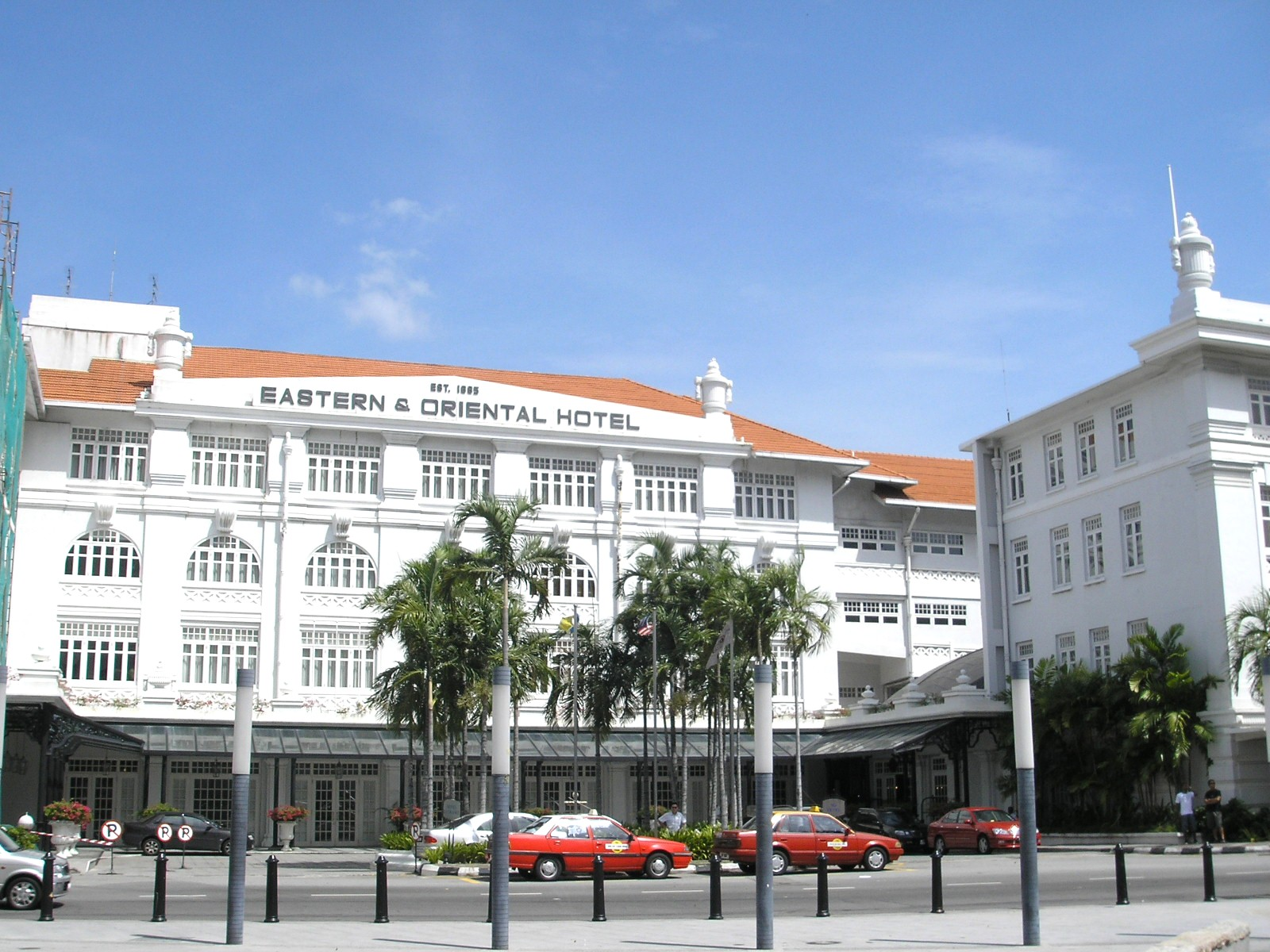
Eastern & Oriental Hotel

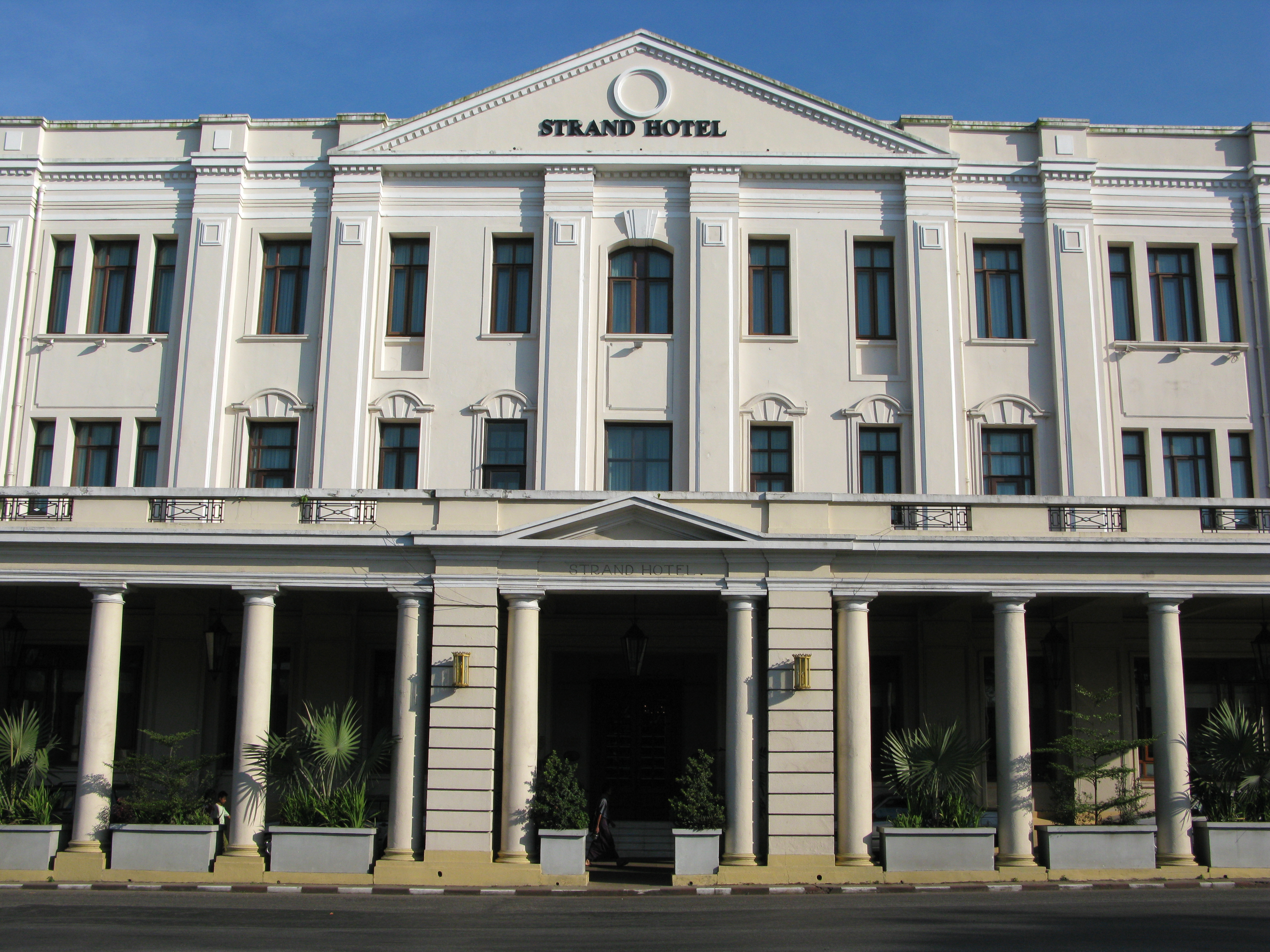
Strand Hotel

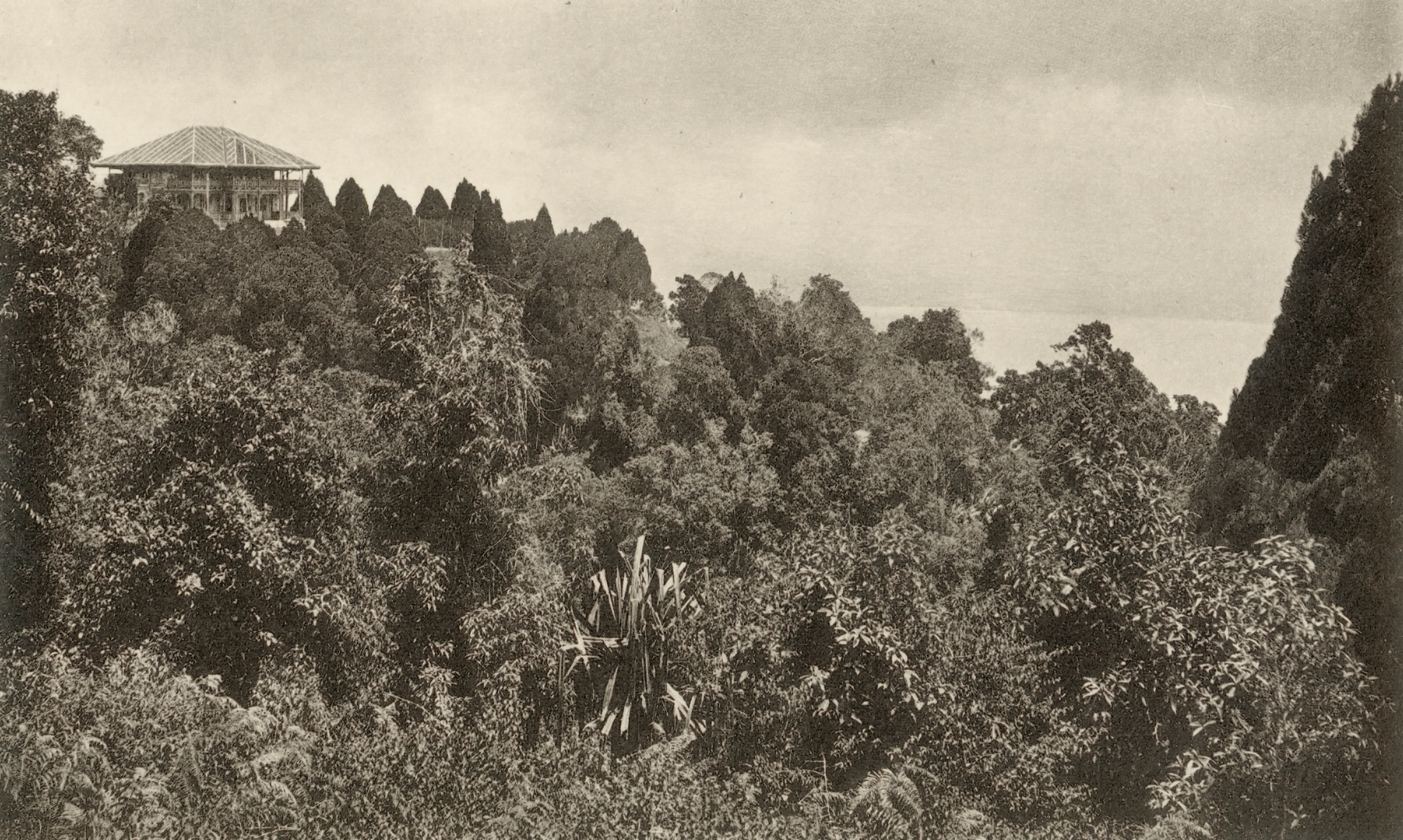
Crag Hotel, c. 1910

In chronological order, the hotels founded or run by the brothers were:

- 1884: Eastern Hotel, George Town, Penang, Malaysia.
- 1885: Oriental Hotel, George Town, Penang, Malaysia. Previously the Hotel de l’Europe.
- 1887: Raffles Hotel, Singapore.
- 1889: Eastern & Oriental Hotel formed as a result of the renaming of the Oriental Hotel, and the selling of the Eastern Hotel.
- 1901: Strand Hotel, Rangoon (Yangon), Burma (Myanmar). Sold by the brothers in 1925.
- 1905: Crag Hotel, Penang Hill, Malaysia. Sold to Federated Malay States Railways in 1925, abandoned in 1954.
- 1923: Sea View Hotel, Singapore, originally built in 1906 and operated by the Sarkies Brothers under lease until 1931. Closed in 1964, with original building demolished shortly thereafter.

In addition, Kartika Wijaya (originally Jambe Dawe) in Batu, Java, Indonesia was built in 1891 originally as a vacation villa for the Sarkies, and was later turned into a hotel.

The brothers' cousin Arathoon Sarkies (1882–1932) also managed the Adelphi Hotel in Singapore from 1903 to 1908.

Martin's son Lucas Martin Sarkies (1876–1941) founded the Hotel Oranje (now Hotel Majapahit) in Surabaya, Indonesia in 1910, and the hotel stayed in the hands of their descendants until 1969.

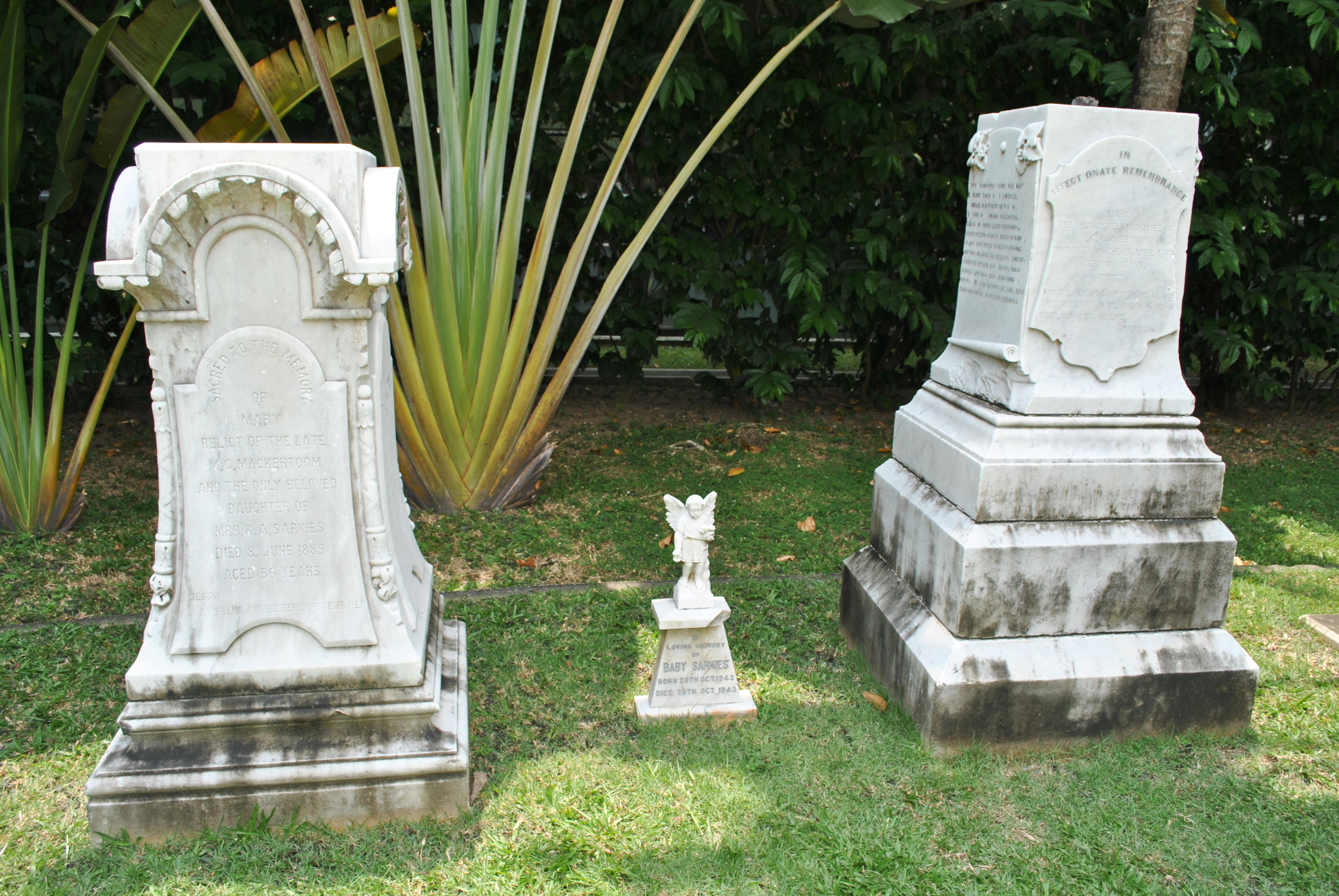
Tombs of the Sarkies family from the 19th century in the churchyard of the Armenian Church, Singapore

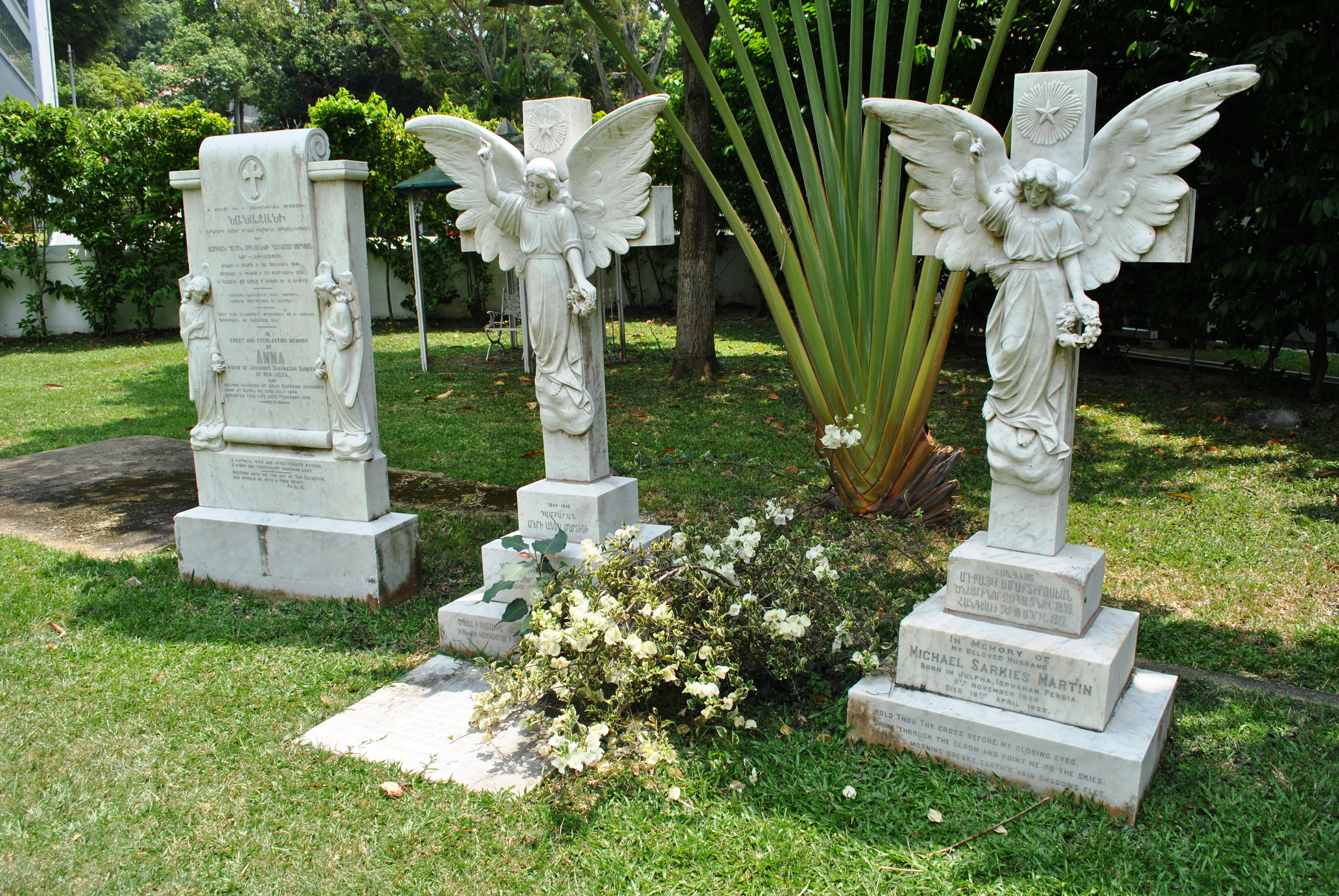
Tombs of the Sarkies family from the 20th century in the churchyard of the Armenian Church, Singapore

== See also ==
- Armenians in Singapore
