= The International School of Penang (Uplands) =

Private school in Malaysia

- Respect for Self; Respect for Others
- Batu Feringghi, Penang, Penang Island; Malaysia

Information
- Type: Private, for-profit
- Motto: Respect for Self; Respect for Others
- Founded: 1955
- Principal: Marc Mesich
- Gender: Mixed
- Age range: 4–19
- Enrollment: ±600
- Language: English
- Houses: 4
- Colours: Dark green, gold
- Athletics conference: Federation of British International Schools (FOBISIA)
- Mascot: Roar (Lion)
- Team name: Uplands
- Accreditation: IBO; CIE; CIS
- Newspaper: Touchbase
- Yearbook: The Uplander
- Website: uplands.org

The International School of Penang (Uplands), commonly known as Uplands School or simply Uplands, is a boarding, FOBISIA-member school in Penang, Malaysia. Founded in 1955, it was first situated on Penang Hill, moving to Gurney Drive and finally Batu Ferringhi in 2006. Uplands School is a multicultural, multiracial, and multinational community whose aim is to promote the motto "Respect for Self. Respect for Others".

== Overview ==
Uplands occupies a five-and-a-half-acre site near the sea in the tourist area of Batu Ferringhi, approximately 11 kilometres from George Town. Housed in new buildings since 2006, facilities include 36 classrooms, five laboratories, two drama rooms, two music rooms, two computer labs, an indoor multi-purpose hall, a 25-metre outdoor swimming pool, and a games field.

Students are mainly divided into thirteen year groups. The school curriculum incorporates the International Baccalaureate Primary Years Programme for years 1 to 6, a school-developed program for years 7 to 9, and a wide range of subject choices for the IGCSE (years 10 to 11). In years 12 and 13, Uplands students complete the IB Diploma Programme. German, French, Mandarin, and Malay are among the language subjects offered, and there is an ESL programme aimed at pupils for whom English is not the first language. The maximum class size is 25. Over one-half of the staff are expatriate teachers, many with previous international experience. A special educational needs department caters to children with mild learning disabilities. Uplands has been accredited by the Council of International Schools.

== Accreditation and membership ==
Uplands is an IB World School, recognised and accredited by the following organisations:

- Malaysian Ministry of Education
- International Baccalaureate Organization
- Cambridge International Examinations
- Edexcel International Examinations
- Council of International Schools

The school is also a member of the Federation of British International Schools in Asia and the Boarding Schools' Association.

== History ==
=== Early years: 1955–1977 ===
The International School of Penang (Uplands) was established during the Malayan Emergency. During this time, the Malayan Communist Party was waging a guerrilla war focused on crippling Malaya's economy by sabotaging rubber and oil palm estates as well as tin mines. As the violence throughout the peninsula intensified, the Executive Council of the Incorporated Society of Planters set in motion a plan for a school in a secure location, where they could educate their children.

A lease for the Crag Hotel on Penang Hill was negotiated with the Penang state government, and work was undertaken to prepare the dilapidated buildings for their first intake of nearly 60 boarders in the Easter term of 1955. A number of new students were also absorbed from an existing small private school on the hill called Uplands, a name that the new school adopted.

In 1972, Queen Elizabeth II and the Duke of Edinburgh visited Penang Hill as part of their Malaysia and Singapore tour.

=== Downtown years: 1977–2005 ===
After 22 years on Penang Hill, Uplands reached the limit of possible expansion. In the 1950s, most of the school's students came from expatriate planter and mining families. By the 1970s, it had a broader mix of students from different backgrounds, including more Malaysian pupils.

In 1976, Uplands started to take in day students and opened its secondary department, with seven students in form 1. To cater to this expansion and new needs, the school moved to a new location, on Kelawei Road.

The Burmah Road boarding house was a large mansion with five dormitories and two common rooms that accommodated about 60 boarders. The school campus on Kelawei Road started with eight classrooms and two small offices. The new school had access to a large sports field for regular and inter-school matches, and the boarders were now allowed out on excursions to parks, movies, and concerts.

With the move, the number of students increased even further, beginning a rapid era of growth for the school. From seven students in form 1 in 1977, the numbers shot up to 70 by 1979. In 1980, Uplands' first three candidates sat for their O-Level examinations.

As Malaysia transitioned from a primary sector-focussed economy to a manufacturing one from the early 1970s onwards, the change was also apparent in the school's enrolment. By 1983, most of the students' parents were professionals or business people, with only ten percent from the planting community. Uplands also became more multicultural.

The rapid expansion of the 1980s involved renovations and new buildings, to meet its expanding needs. By the mid-1980s the junior school had moved over to the Burmah Road house, which meant shifting the boarders to a new campus of three houses along York Road, while the building along Kelawei Road housed the senior school. Uplands' multi-campus years did not last long, as the school was able to successfully negotiate for the lease of the historic St Joseph's Novitiate, which had been unoccupied for 17 years.

In academic matters, Uplands was also making strides befitting its position as one of the oldest and most established international schools not only in Penang but the whole of Malaysia. In addition to offering the International General Certificate of Secondary Education, the school's sixth form, offering Cambridge A-level courses in the sciences and humanities, was launched in 1996. By 1999/2000, with a population numbering over 600 students, the school marked two significant new academic achievements.

The first was the receipt of authorisation from the International Baccalaureate Organisation to offer the IB Diploma Programme, making it one of only two international schools in Malaysia to do so. Uplands also succeeded in obtaining accreditation by the European Council of International Schools, the world's oldest association of international schools, as well as the New England Association of Schools and Colleges, becoming the first and only school in Malaysia with this distinction.

=== New location: 2006–present ===
For half a century, from its establishment in 1955 until 2006, Uplands had always been housed in leased buildings. During the 2000/2001 academic year, the Penang Municipal Council granted the school planning permission for the construction of a new campus, on land it had acquired in Batu Ferringhi. The new, four-acre campus launched in 2006. The further construction and opening of F-Block on 16 April 2016 provided the school with additional classrooms, activity, and assembly space.

== Notable alumni ==
- Jho Low – businessman and international fugitive, most infamously known for his involvement in the 1MDB scandal.
