= Strand Hotel =

Coordinates: 16°46′10.56″N 96°9′45.31″E

The Strand
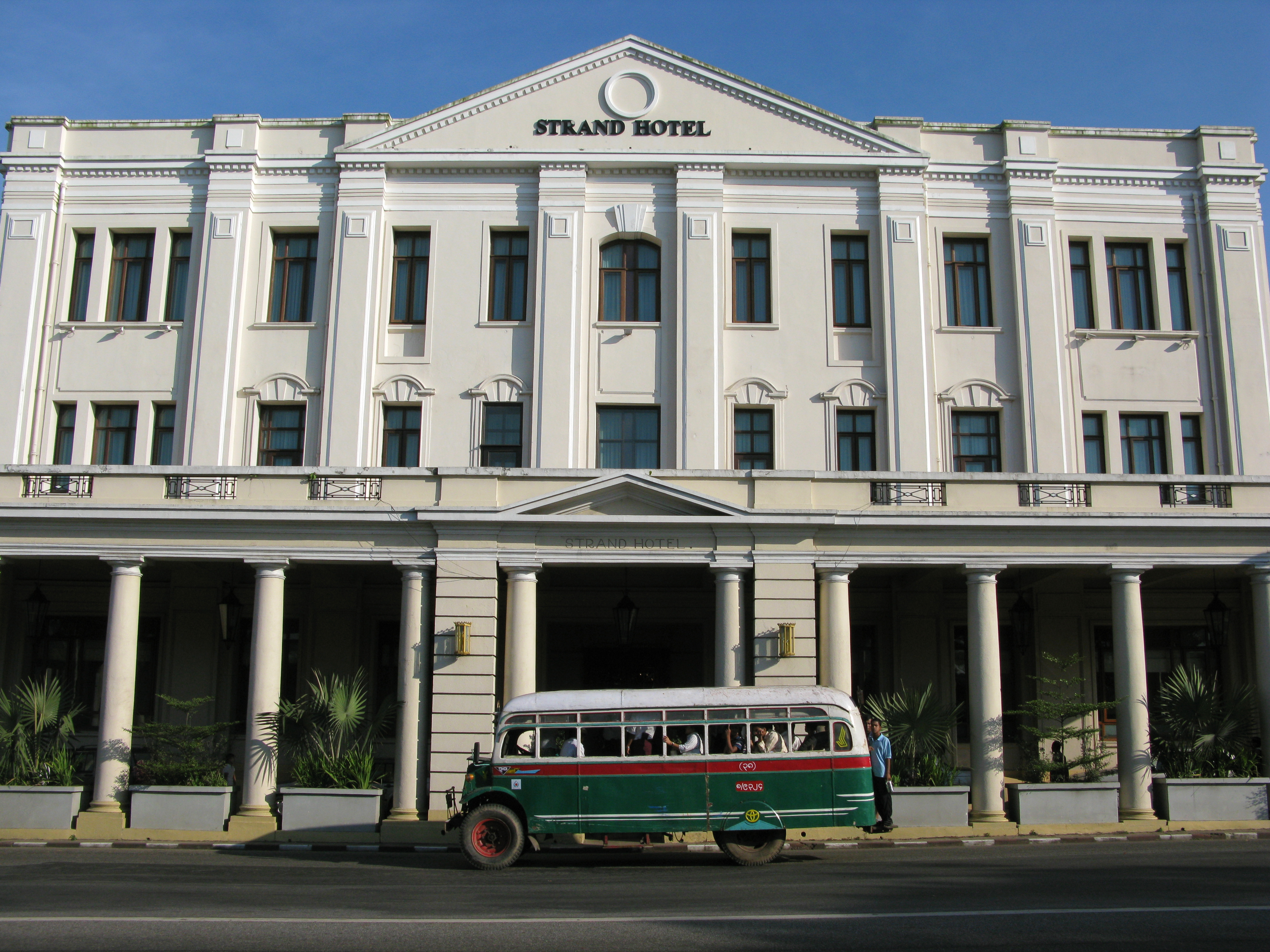

General information
- Type: Hotel
- Architectural style: Colonial
- Location: 92 Strand Road, Yangon, Myanmar
- Completed: 1901; 125 years ago
- Owner: GCP Hospitality

Website
- www.dusit.com/dusitcollection-thestrand-yangon/

Yangon City Landmark

The Strand Hotel Yangon - Dusit Collection (widely known as The Strand Hotel) is a historic Victorian-style hotel located in Yangon, Myanmar (Burma). The hotel, which opened in 1901 and faces the Yangon River to its south, is one of the most famous hotels in Yangon and Southeast Asia, and is managed by Dusit International. The hotel is named after its address, at 92 Strand Road. The hotel is listed on the Yangon City Heritage List.

== History ==
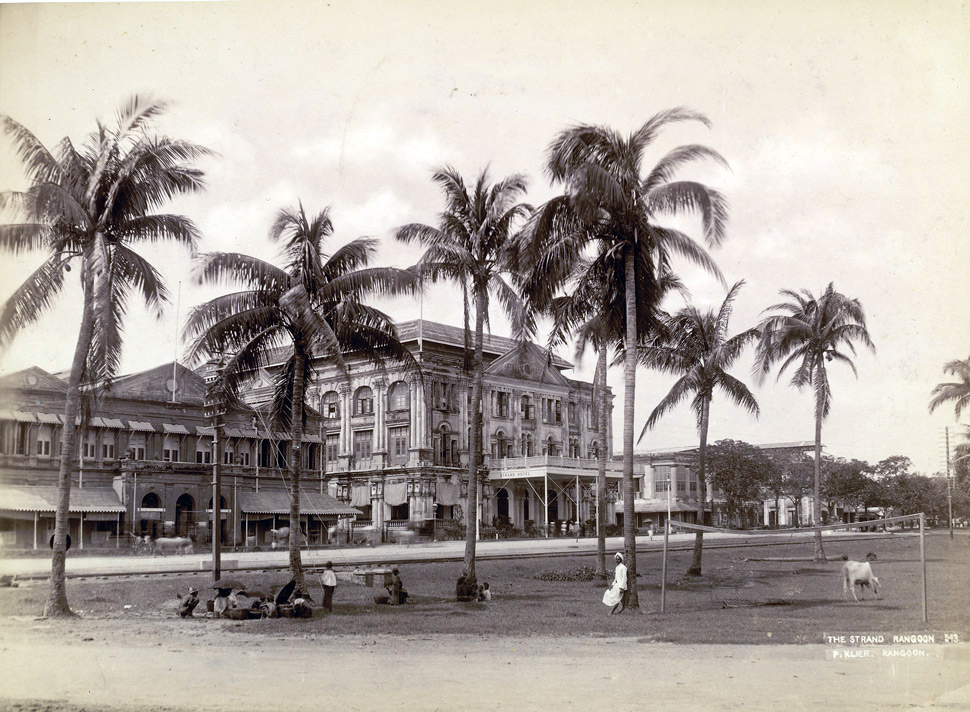
The Strand Hotel, early 1900s, along the banks of the Rangoon River

The Strand opened in 1901. It was built by the British entrepreneur John Darwood but later acquired by the Sarkies brothers, who owned a number of luxury hotels in the Far East, including the Raffles Hotel in Singapore and the Eastern & Oriental Hotel in Penang, Malaysia. During the colonial period, The Strand was one of the most luxurious hotels in the British Empire with a clientele of exclusively whites. It was regarded as “the finest hostelry east of the Suez,” “patronised by royalty, nobility, and distinguished personages." The Sarkies brothers sold The Strand to Rangoon restaurateur Peter Bugalar Aratoon and Ae Amovsie in 1925. The hotel underwent a major renovation in 1937. In 1941, during the Japanese occupation of Burma in World War II, the hotel was used briefly to quarter Japanese troops. The following year, the Strand's ownership was transferred to the Imperial Hotel in Tokyo. In 1945, the Strand began accepting Burmese customers. After Burma achieved independence in 1948, the hotel was neglected by post-colonial governments. In 1963, The Strand Hotel was bought by the Burma Economic Development Corporation, which poorly maintained it. After the 1988 coup d'état, The Strand was sold in 1989 to Bernard Pe-Win, a Burmese businessman, who formed an alliance with Adrian Zecha and a group of investors who formed The Strand Hotel International.

Following a total renovation, The Strand reopened in 1993 as an all-suite, top-of-the range boutique hotel. Its teak and marble floors, mahogany furniture, and canopied beds complement original pieces, like period bathroom fixtures. A swimming pool was added to the hotel in 2017 along with gym facilities.

In 2003, Andreas Augustin published the first history of the hotel, after years of extensive research.

In 2013, GHM (General Hotel Management) ceased operating the hotel, which it had run since 1999.

In 2019, Singapore-listed Memories Group purchased a minority share in Strand Hotel International Limited (SHIL), which held a 50% stake in Myanmar Hotel International Company, which had long-term leasehold rights and operated, and managed the Strand Hotel.

In November 2026, Dusit Hotels and Resorts assumed operation of the hotel, and it was renamed The Strand Hotel Yangon - Dusit Collection.

== See also ==
- Eastern & Oriental Hotel and Raffles Hotel, other hotels established by the Sarkies Brothers.

== Notes ==
- Andrews, Jim (January 2006). "Tiffin Time Again". The Irrawaddy.
- Falconer, John; Daniel Kahrs; Elizabeth Moore; Luca Invernizzi (2001). Burmese Design and Architecture. Tuttle Publishing. ISBN 962-593-882-6.

== Literature ==
- William Warren, Jill Gocher (2007). Asia's legendary hotels: the romance of travel. Singapore: Periplus Editions. ISBN 978-0-7946-0174-4.
- Andreas Augustin (2017) [2003, updated 2013]. The Strand Yangon. Vienna: The Most Famous Hotels in the World. ISBN 978-3-900692-44-5.
