= Crag Hotel =

Abandoned hotel in Penang, Malaysia

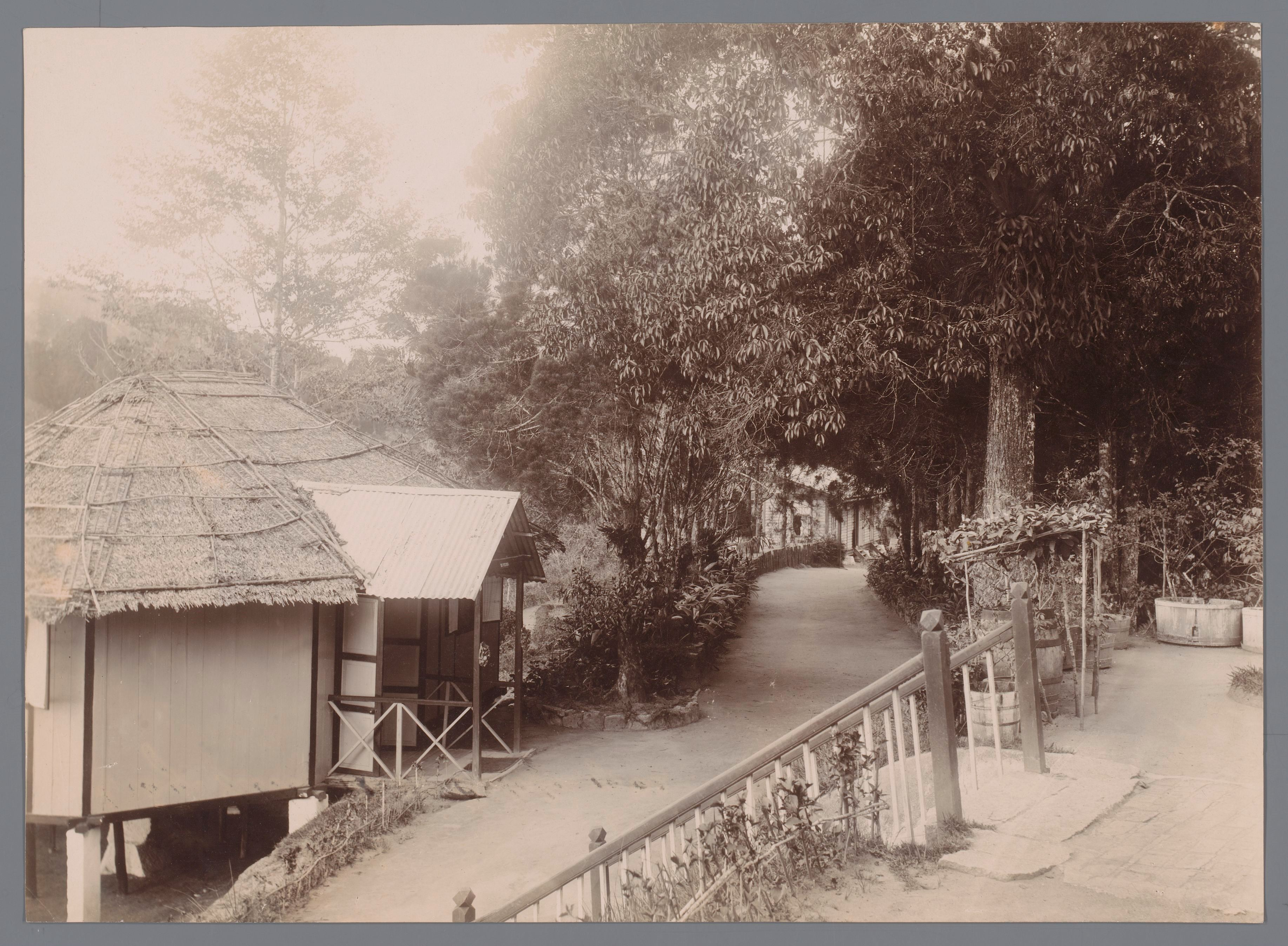
- Crag Hotel in 1902

General information
- Type: Hotel
- Architectural style: Colonial
- Location: Jalan Bukit Bendera, 11500 Ayer Itam, Penang, Malaysia
- Opened: 1885
- Landlord: Penang Island City Council

Design and construction
- Developer: Sarkies Brothers

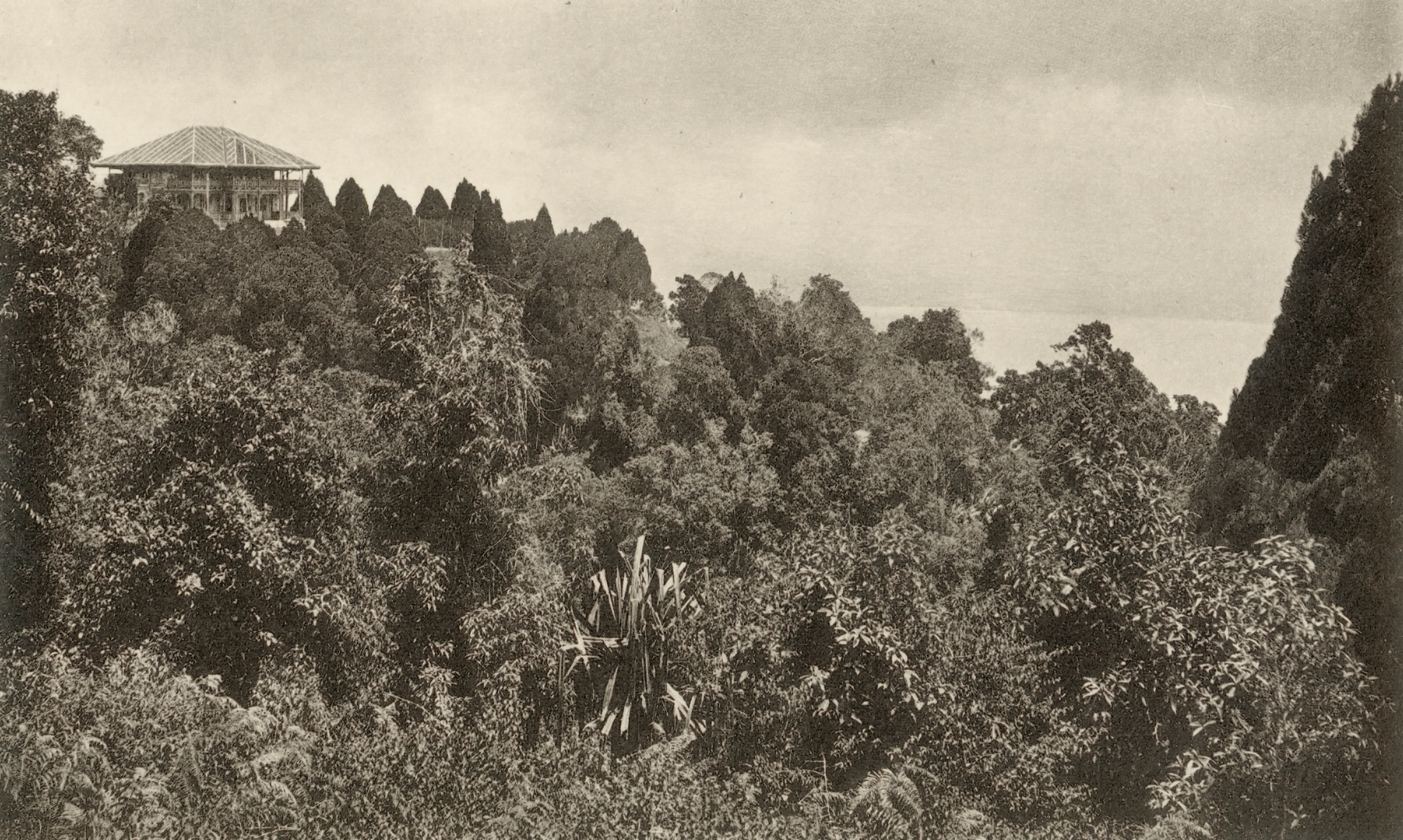
Crag Hotel, c. 1910

The Crag Hotel is an abandoned hotel and former school building on the north edge of Penang Hill, in Malaysia.

== History ==
=== Hotel ===
The original site was first occupied by a man named William Clubley in 1845 and was most likely a private residence. By the early 1850s, it was used as a sanatorium. In 1896, John W. Kerr, an employee of the East India Company, took over the lease and made numerous improvements to the site, naming it "the Crag", and it became a popular retreat for Europeans living in George Town and on Penang Island as a place to escape the intense heat and humidity of the lower coastal areas. In the late 1880s, the lease was taken over by four Armenian immigrants, the Sarkies brothers, and following minor renovations was turned into a hotel that boasted nine bungalows. The hotel prospered until the outbreak of World War I, when it was sold to the colonial government. Although it was still managed by the Sarkies brothers, by 1925, it was handed over to the Federated Malay States Railway. Most of the hotel was completely rebuilt in 1930, and it continued operating until the Second World War, when it was requisitioned by the occupying Japanese army, who turned it into a prison for British captives. The Crag Hotel reopened in 1947 but was not as popular as it had been previously, and it finally closed its doors in 1954.

=== School ===
After the war, the building fell into disuse for a number of years, until it was leased to the Uplands School in 1955. When the school moved to a new site in 1977, the buildings were abandoned.

=== Film set ===
The site became a filming location for the 1992 Régis Wargnier film Indochine, which starred Catherine Deneuve. It was also used for the 2015–2016 BBC Channel 4 television series Indian Summers.

=== Current condition ===
Several attempts have been made to attract the interest of an overseas hotel chain to redevelop the Crag Hotel site, but as of January 2026, it continues to lie in ruins.
