= Lovers' Isle =

Islet off George Town in Penang, Malaysia

Native name: Ujong Batu
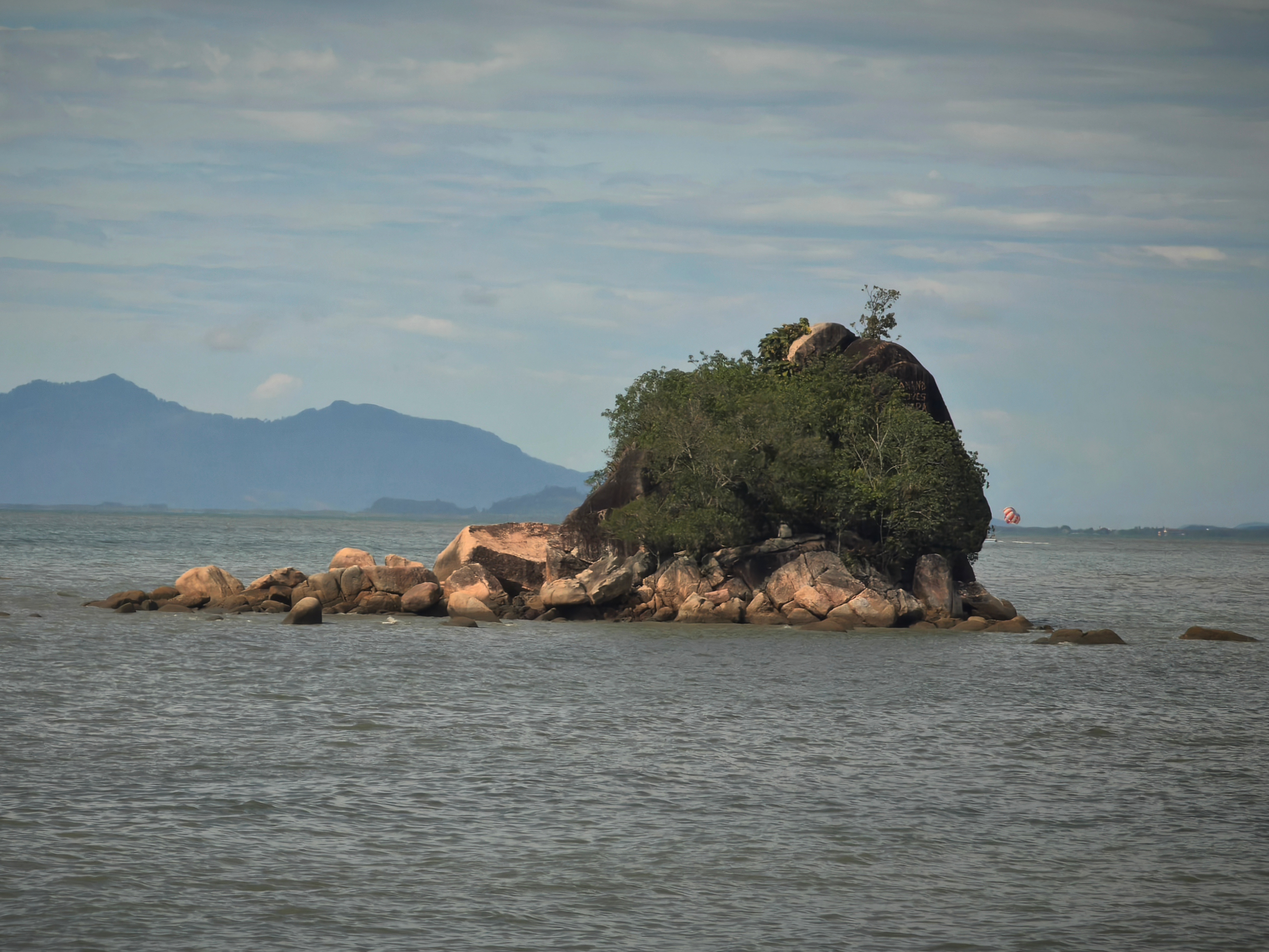

Geography
- Location: Strait of Malacca
- Coordinates: 5°27′58.935″N 100°14′8.6562″E

Administration
- Malaysia
- State: Penang
- City: George Town
- District: Southwest
- Mukim: Teluk Bahang

Lovers' Isle is an islet in Southwest Penang Island District, Penang, Malaysia, located off the northern coast of Penang Island. Located off Batu Ferringhi, a suburb of the city of George Town, this uninhabited rocky outcrop was where the first European sailors to reach what is now Penang arrived in the 16th century.

== Etymology ==
The isle was once named Batu Ferringhi ( English: Portuguese Rock) and has lent its name to the now popular tourist destination of Batu Ferringhi, a suburb of George Town. In the 16th century, Portuguese sailors landed at the rock to obtain fresh water from the nearby streams. At the time, the Malay word Ferringhi, which was in turn derived from the Arabic ferringi, was originally used to denote a person of Portuguese descent.

Urban legend has it that Lovers' Isle was named as such after a couple, each of a different ethnicity, committed suicide at this outcrop. To this day, Lovers' Isle is still visited by couples during low tides.

== See also ==
- List of islands of Malaysia
