= Eastern & Oriental Hotel =

Hotel in George Town, Penang, Malaysia

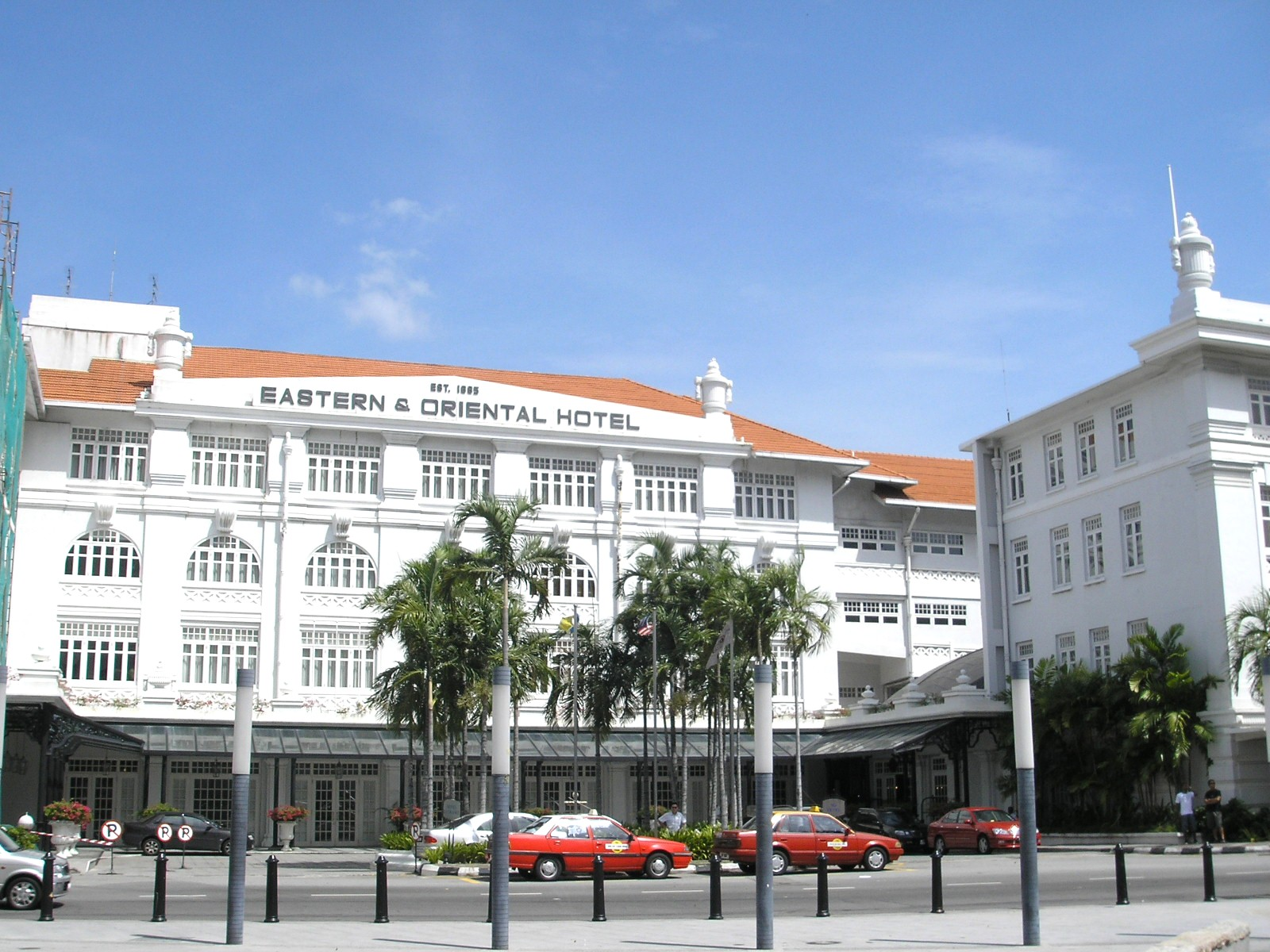
- Interactive map of the Eastern & Oriental Hotel area

General information
- Type: Hotel
- Architectural style: Colonial
- Location: 10 Farquhar Street, George Town, Penang, Malaysia
- Coordinates: 5.423322°N 100.335923°E
- Opened: 1885
- Landlord: Eastern & Oriental Berhad

Design and construction
- Developer: Sarkies Brothers

Website
- eohotels.com

UNESCO World Heritage Site
- Type: Cultural
- Criteria: ii, iii, iv
- Designated: 2008 (32nd session)
- Part of: George Town UNESCO Core Zone
- Reference no.: 1223
- Region: Asia-Pacific

The Eastern & Oriental Hotel (stylised as E&O Hotel) is a British colonial-style luxury hotel in George Town, Penang, Malaysia that was established in 1885 by the Sarkies Brothers. The sea-fronting hotel is known for its luxurious accommodation and restaurants.

== History ==
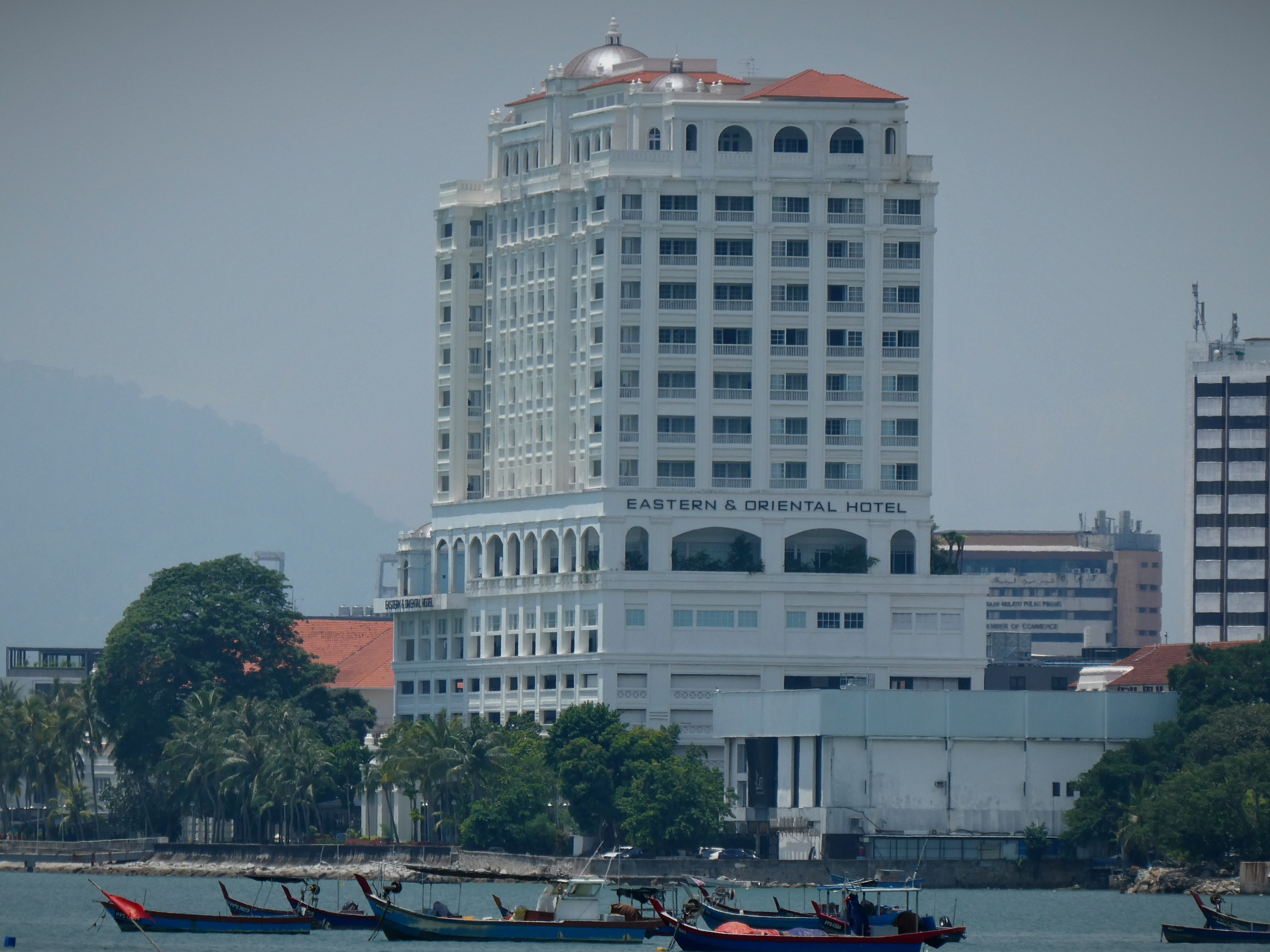
Victory Annexe

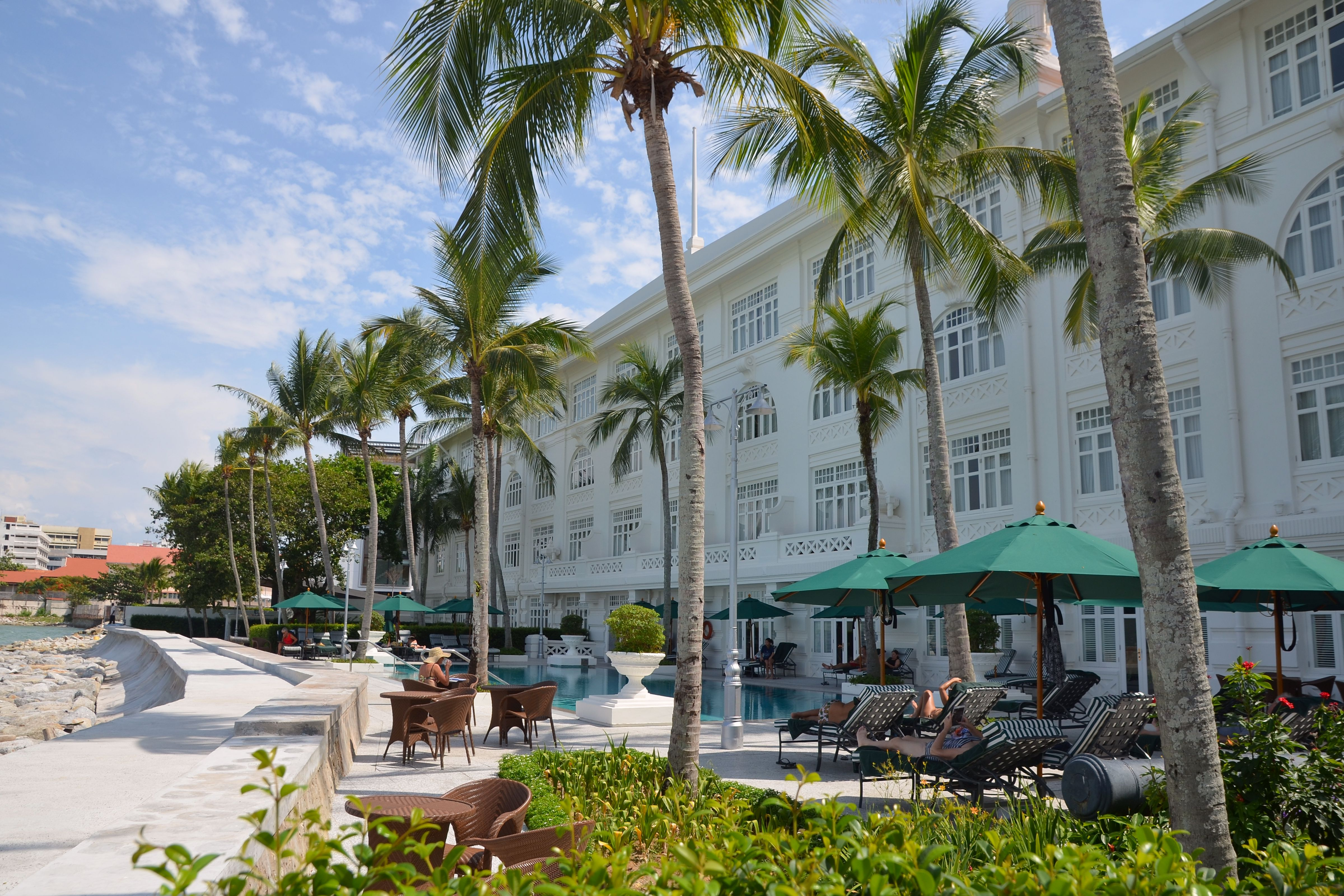
E&O Hotel pool and seafront

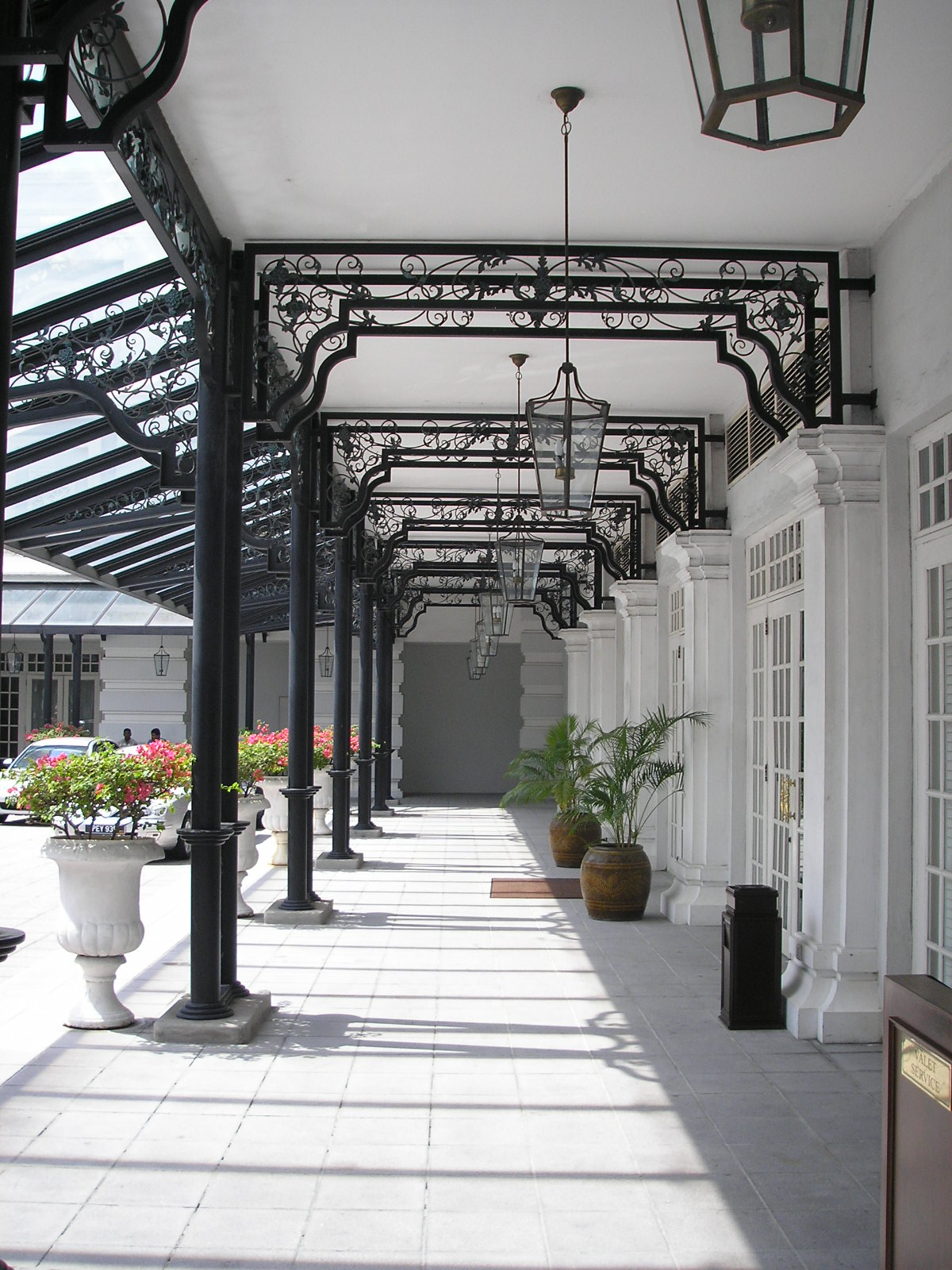
Porch of the Eastern & Oriental Hotel

The Eastern Hotel was founded by the Sarkies Brothers in 1884. Within one year, the hotel had prospered and surged in popularity such that the brothers established another hotel, the Oriental Hotel, in 1885, leading to a merger of both hotels into the Eastern & Oriental Hotel in 1889. The success of the brand led the brothers to establish sister hotels, the Raffles Hotel in Singapore in 1887 and the Strand Hotel in Rangoon, Burma, in 1901. Under the management of the brothers the E & O hotel would receive several major expansion works, culminating to the completion of the present hotel complex in 1929. Having failed to adapt to competition following World War II, the hotel underwent several decades of decline, and in 1996 a decision was made by the management to temporarily close down the hotel for major reconstruction. Although the front wing of the hotel, which would later be known as the "Heritage Wing", received restoration work, the rest of the hotel, including the easternmost 1929 "New Wing", was either gutted and refurbished or completely reconstructed in the style of the hotel's older architectural design; the mid-century E&O shopping annexe, which occupied the site of the original 1884 Eastern Hotel building, was also completely leveled for the new central wing of the hotel, which prominently features faux-cast iron-framed verandahs similar in style to those at the Raffles Hotel. Under its new owner, The E&O Group, the hotel was reopened to the public in 2001.

In 2013, the old Victory Annex was demolished and replaced by a new, 132-room tower of the same name.

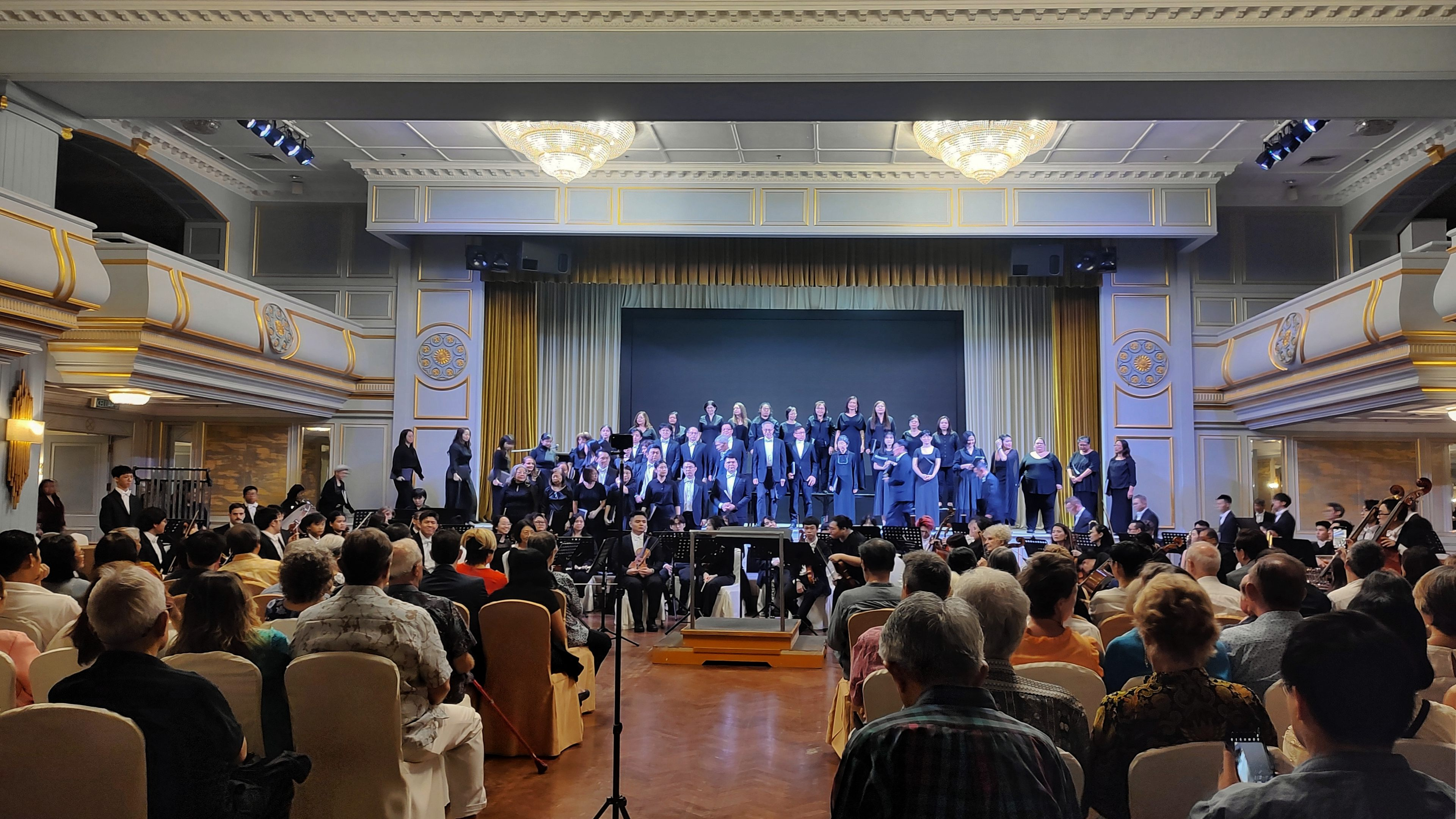
A choral performance in the Grand Ballroom

== See also ==
- Raffles Hotel
- Strand Hotel

== Literature ==
- William Warren, Jill Gocher (2007). Asia's legendary hotels: the romance of travel. Singapore: Periplus Editions. ISBN 978-0-7946-0174-4.
