= Batu Ferringhi =

- Suburb
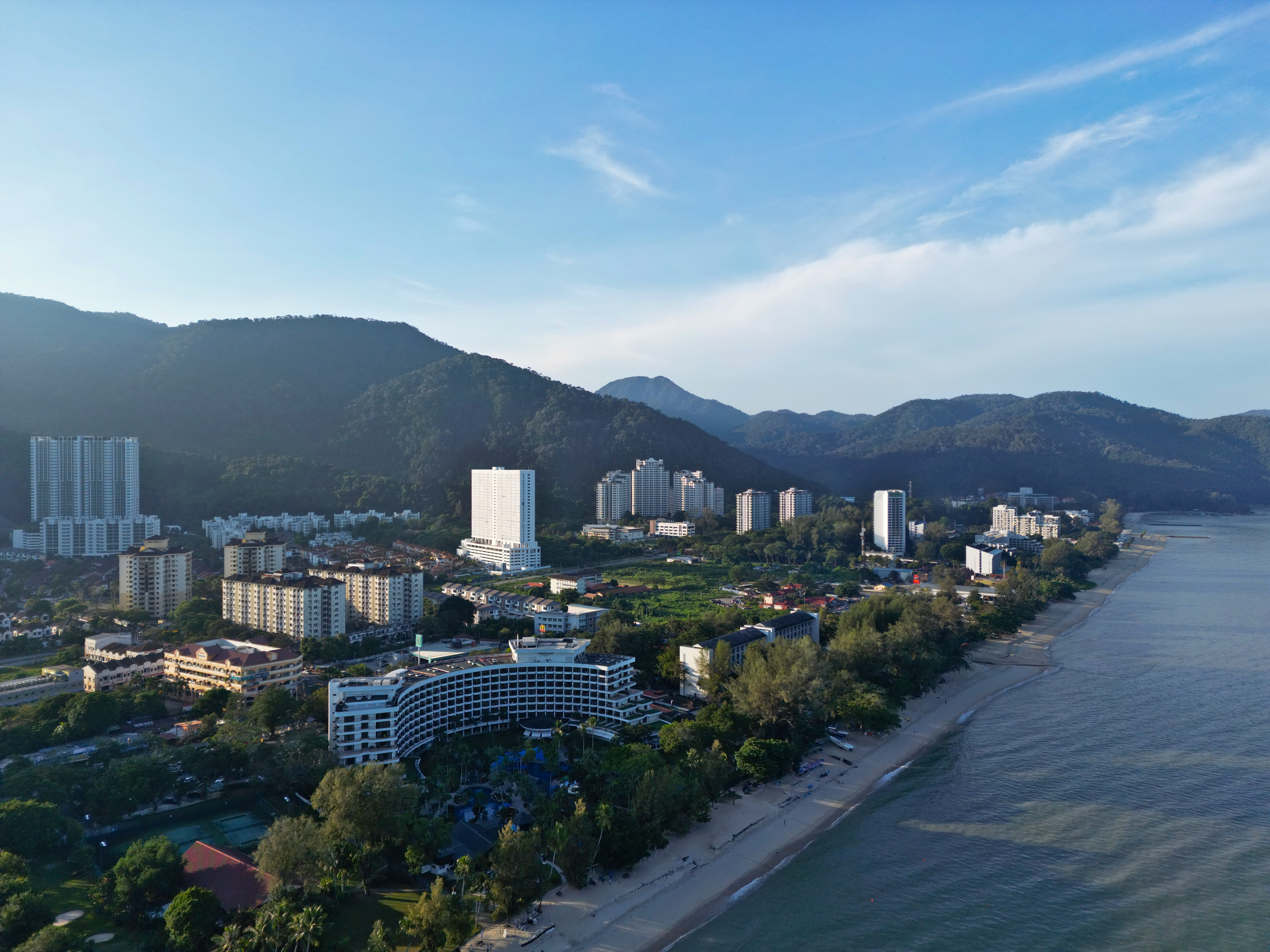
- Interactive map of Batu Ferringhi
- Location within George Town in Penang
- Coordinates: 5°28′5.88″N 100°14′31.2″E
- Country: Malaysia
- State: Penang
- City: George Town
- District: Northeast

Area
  - Total: 2.3 km^{2} (0.89 sq mi)

Population (2020)
  - Total: 9,046
  - Density: 3,900/km^{2} (10,000/sq mi)

Demographics
  - Ethnic groups: 45.6% Chinese; 22.1% Bumiputera; 21.7% Malay; 0.4% indigenous groups from Sabah and Sarawak; 15.6% Indian; 0.9% Other ethnicities; 15.8% Non-citizens
- Time zone: UTC+8 (MST)
  - Summer (DST): Not observed
- Postal code: 11100

Batu Ferringhi is a suburb of George Town in the Malaysian state of Penang. Located along the northern coast of Penang Island and about 11 km (6.8 mi) northwest of the city centre, it is the prime beach destination in Penang among locals and tourists. To cater to the influx of tourists, several major high-rise hotels have been established along the 4 km (2.5 mi) stretch of beaches.

The beach resorts along Batu Ferringhi also offer various water sport activities, such as parasailing. On a clear day, one could get a picturesque view of the Andaman Sea and Mount Jerai, which is located within the neighbouring state of Kedah. In addition, Batu Ferringhi is famous for its night market that offers a wide variety of merchandise and street food.

There had been human activity within Batu Ferringhi as early as 1592, when an Englishman, Sir James Lancaster, arrived and began pillaging other vessels around Penang Island. However, for much of its recent history, Batu Ferringhi was a quiet village, until the urbanisation of the area beginning in the 1970s.

== Etymology ==
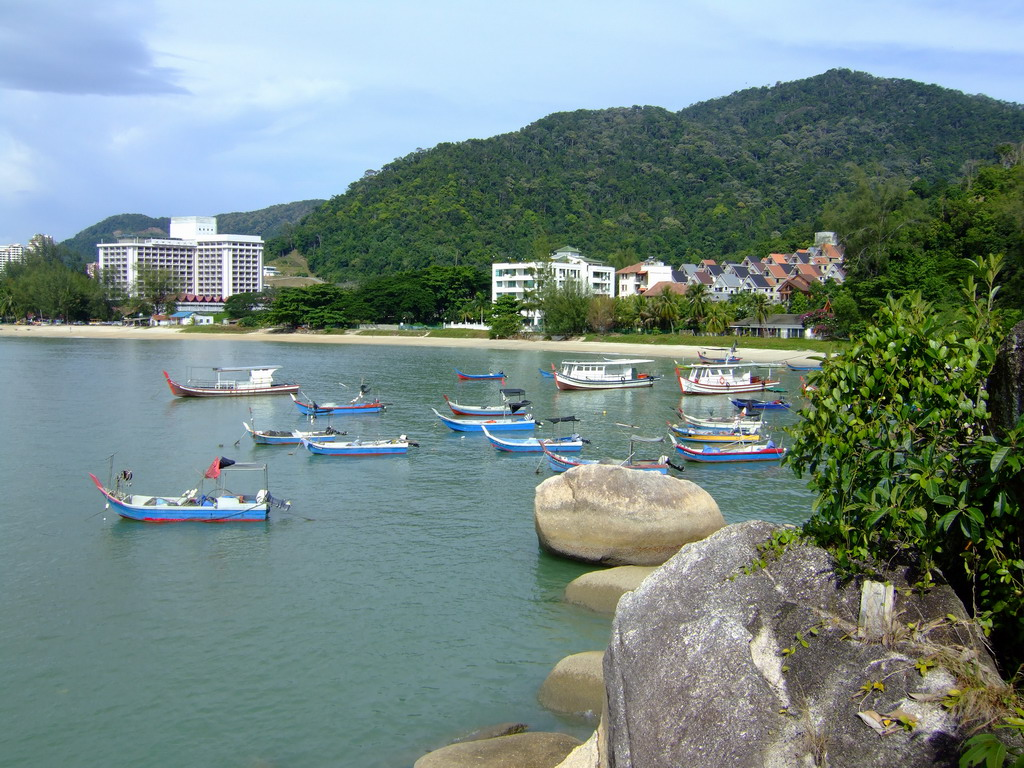
The beaches of Batu Ferringhi, interspersed by rocky outcrops

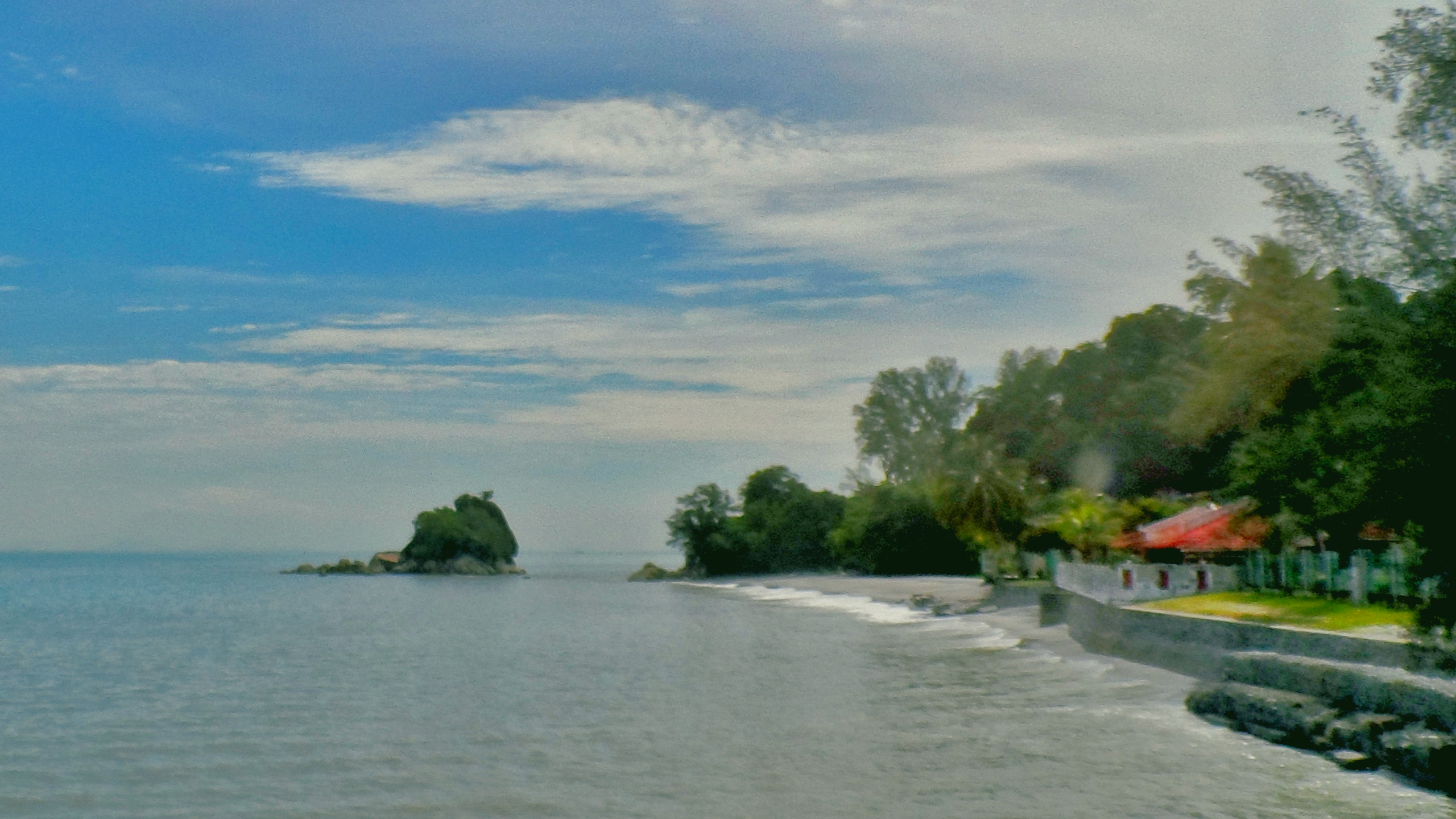
Lovers' Isle off Batu Ferringhi

The word ferringhi or feringgi is the modern spelling of the Classical Malay word peringgi, originally used in reference to the Portuguese conquistadors before being applied to all people of European descent. It is cognate with the Thai farang, Khmer barang and Chinese Fólǎngjī. All are derived from the Sanskrit word firangī (फ़िरंगी) which itself originates either from the Arabic ferringi or Persian farangi (فرنگی). In the Middle East and Africa, it originally referred to the Franks but came to include Europeans in general.

Batu Ferringhi, therefore, would mean the place where Westerners had come ashore, with the Malay word batu (meaning rock) referring to the rocky shoreline of this particular area.

Among Tamils, the area is known as Paringgi Malai meaning "foreigner's hill".

== History ==
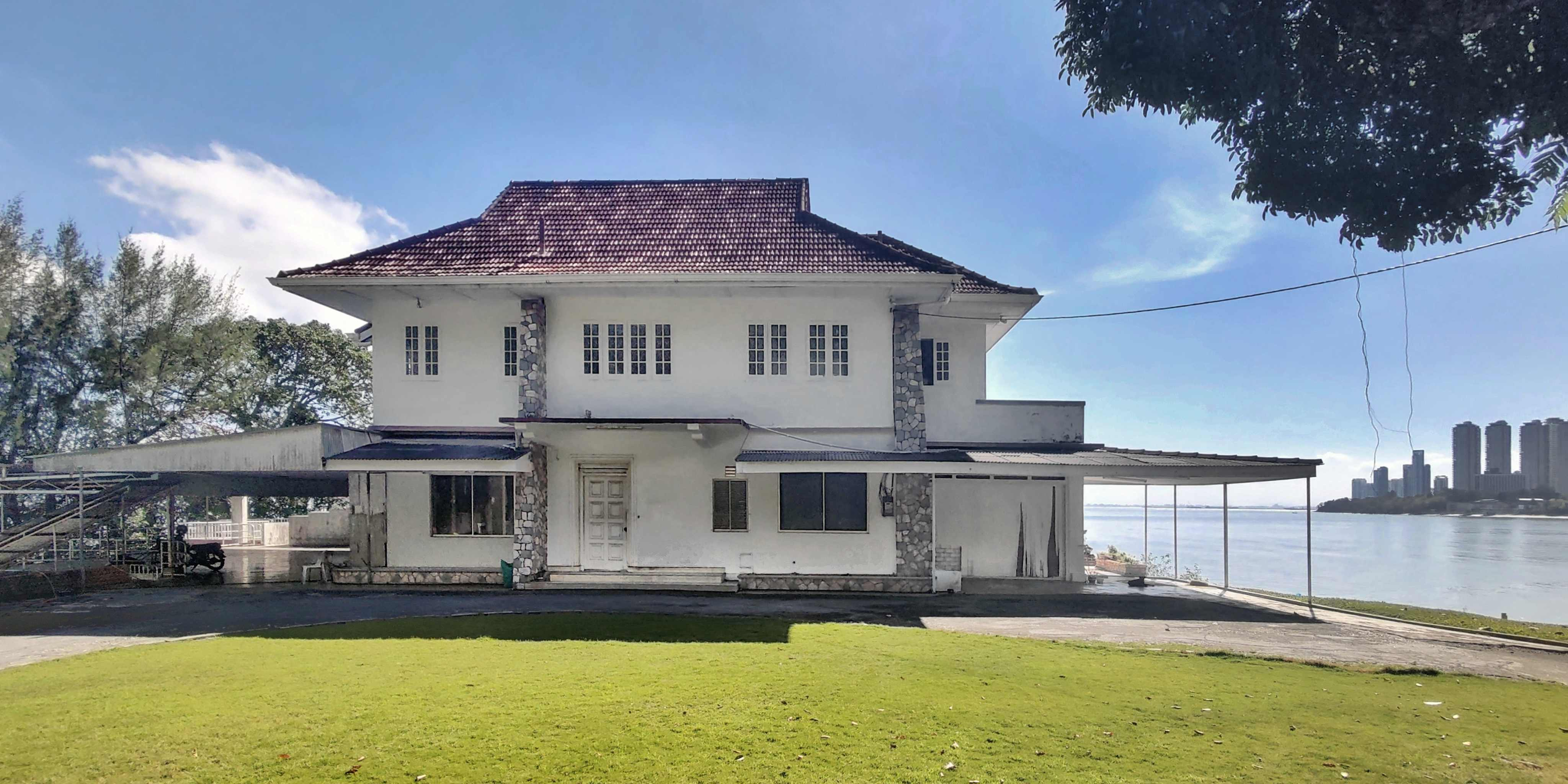
The former Boon Siew Villa at Shamrock Beach

James Lancaster, an English privateer, came ashore at this particular area in 1592. This made Lancaster the first European to reach Penang Island. Having come ashore aboard the Edward Bonaventure, Lancaster and his crew proceeded to pillage every vessel they encountered for the next four months.

The urbanisation of Batu Ferringhi only began in the 1970s. This involved the construction of several hotels along the beaches, attracting locals and tourists alike. Condominiums soon followed, offering gorgeous views of the sea overlooking the Malay Peninsula. However, these developments did not come without problems, such as the deteriorating seawater quality that has led to the infestation of jellyfish around Batu Ferringhi.

Batu Ferringhi was one of the hardest hit areas during the 2004 Indian Ocean tsunami that ultimately claimed a total of 52 lives in Penang.

== Geography ==
Map of Batu Ferringhi.
Click link at the top right corner to zoom in.
1 Ferringhi Walk
2 Shangri-La Golden Sands
3 Hard Rock Penang
4 Parkroyal Penang
5 Mar Vista
6 Shamrock Beach
7 Miami Beach
8 Moonlight Bay
9 Uplands International School

== Demographics ==
Ethnicities within Batu Ferringhi in 2020
Ethnicities / Nationality	Percentage
Chinese	45.6%
Malays	21.7%
Other Bumiputeras	0.4%
Indians	15.6%
Others	0.9%
Non-Malaysians	15.8%

As of 2020, Batu Ferringhi was home to a population of 9,046. Ethnic Chinese constituted over 45% of the area's population, while Malays formed another two-fifths. Close to 16% of the suburb's population consisted of expatriates, closely followed by ethnic Indians.

== Transportation ==
The main thoroughfare within Batu Ferringhi is the coastal Jalan Batu Ferringhi, part of Federal Route 6. The road continues on from Jalan Tanjong Bungah, cutting through the heart of the suburb until it becomes Jalan Teluk Bahang at the western edge of Batu Ferringhi. The few roads within this suburb, including Jalan Batu Ferringhi, are prone to traffic congestion due to its popularity as a tourist destination.

Rapid Penang buses 101 and 102 serve the residents of the suburb, by connecting Batu Ferringhi with various destinations within the city, such as Tanjong Bungah, Tanjong Tokong, the Penang International Airport and Queensbay Mall.

== Education ==
Pai Chai Primary School's exterior

Batu Ferringhi is served by a primary school and an international school.

Primary school

- Pai Chai National Type Chinese Primary School

International school

- The International School of Penang (Uplands)

== Retail ==
Although Batu Ferringhi does not have a shopping centre, the suburb is notable for its night market. Souvenirs, DVDs, artworks, jerseys, and other apparels and accessories can be found at bargain prices within the night market, which is also lined with various food stalls that sell Penang's famed street cuisine and titbits.

== Tourist attractions ==
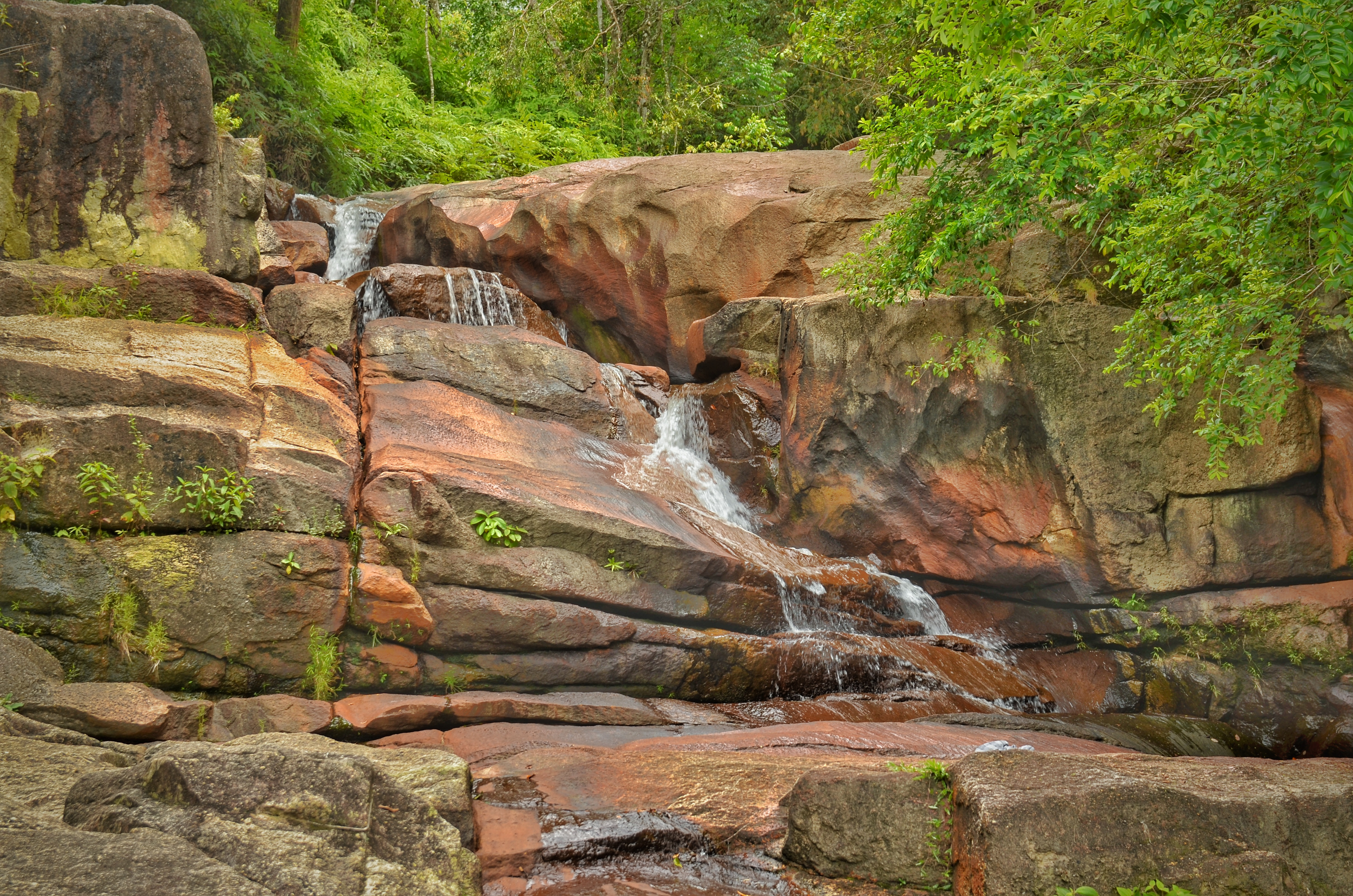
Chin Farm waterfall in Batu Ferringhi

- Miami Beach
- Moonlight Beach
- Shamrock Beach
- Lovers' Isle
- Batu Ferringhi Night Market
- Hard Rock Hotel
