= Tunjungan Street =

Street in Surabaya, Indonesia

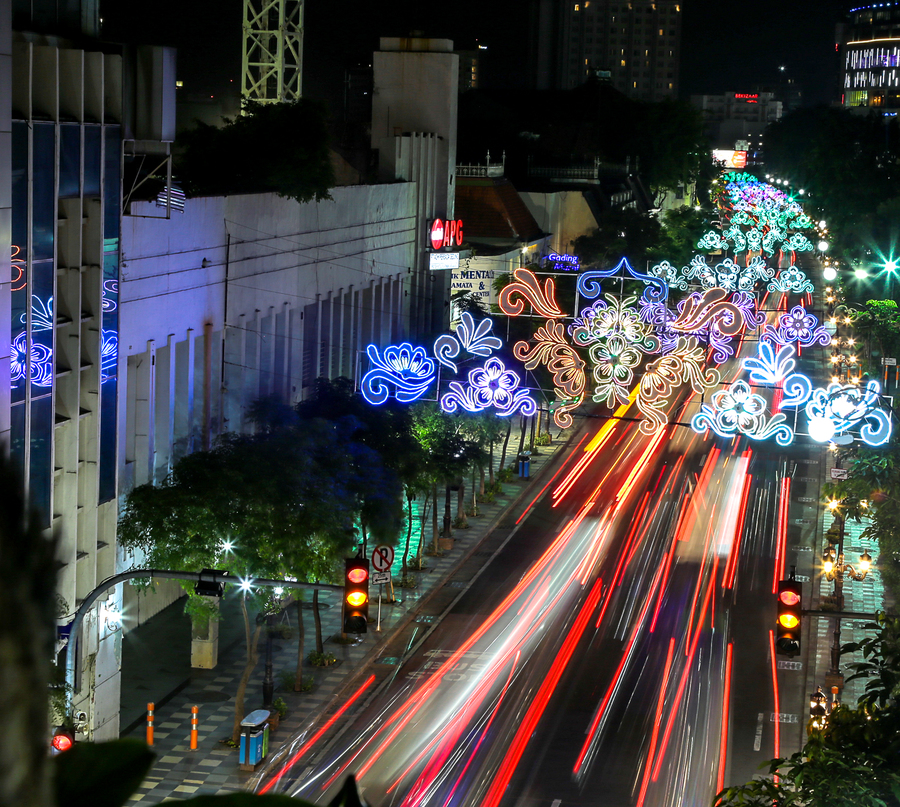
- Tunjungan Street at night, c. 2020.
- Interactive map of Tunjungan Street
- Native name: Jalan Tunjungan (Indonesian); Toendjoengan Weg (Dutch)
- Owner: Government of the City of Surabaya
- Maintained by: Surabaya Department of Transportation (Dinas Perhubungan Kota Surabaya)
- Length: 0.9 km (0.56 mi)
- Location: Surabaya, East Java, Indonesia
- Postal code: 60271, 60275
- Coordinates: 7.2593503°S 112.7388733°E
- North end: Genteng Kali / Praban / Gemblongan Streets
- South end: Embong Malang / Suryo / Basuki Rachmat Avenues

Tunjungan Street (Indonesian: Jalan Tunjungan) is a street and major thoroughfare in Downtown Surabaya, Indonesia. The name is also generally more used for the business district surrounding the street. It has a prominence importance in the history of the city’s development and continues to the present day. Famous for its shops, offices, cafes, restaurants and hotels (particularly the very historic Hotel Majapahit), the street became an icon of the city itself.

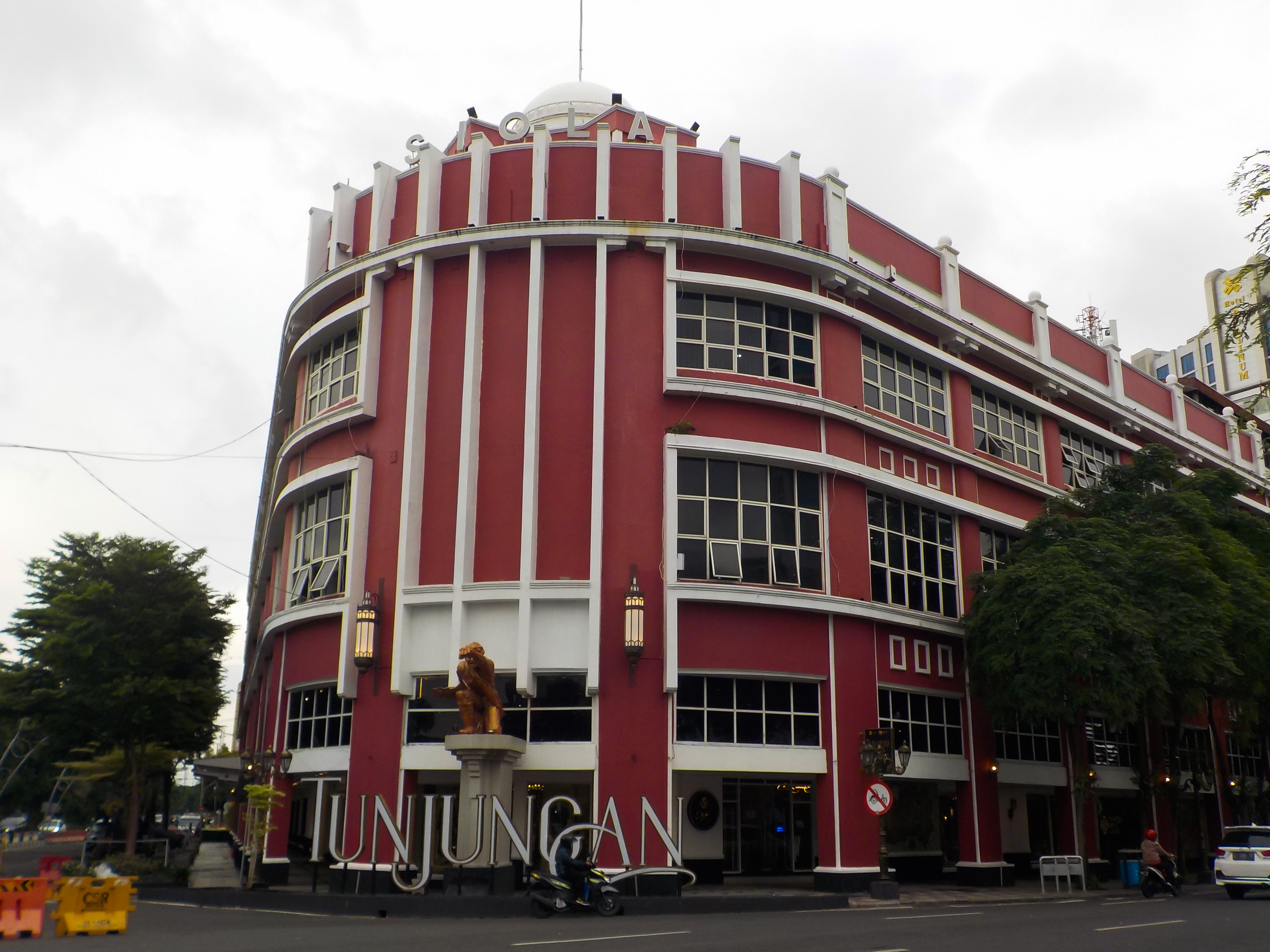
A sign of Tunjungan Street

Though not located along Tunjungan Street, a prominent shopping mall, Tunjungan Plaza, is also located adjacent to the street. The street was also a witness to the famous Yamato Hotel incident which eventually culminated in the Battle of Surabaya during the early months of the Indonesian National Revolution.

== History ==
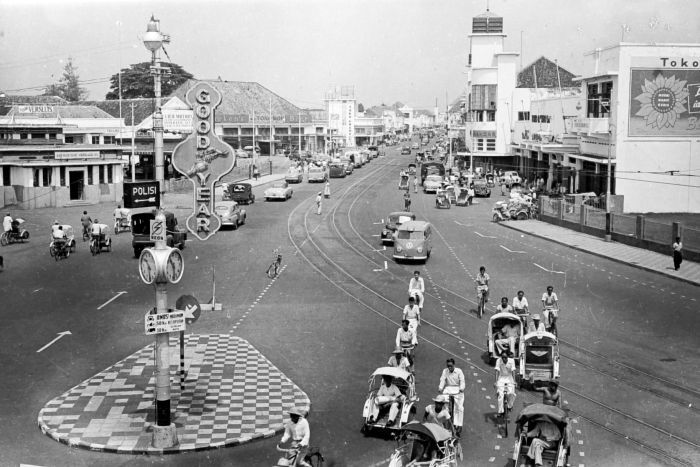
Tunjungan Street and its surrounding area in 1953

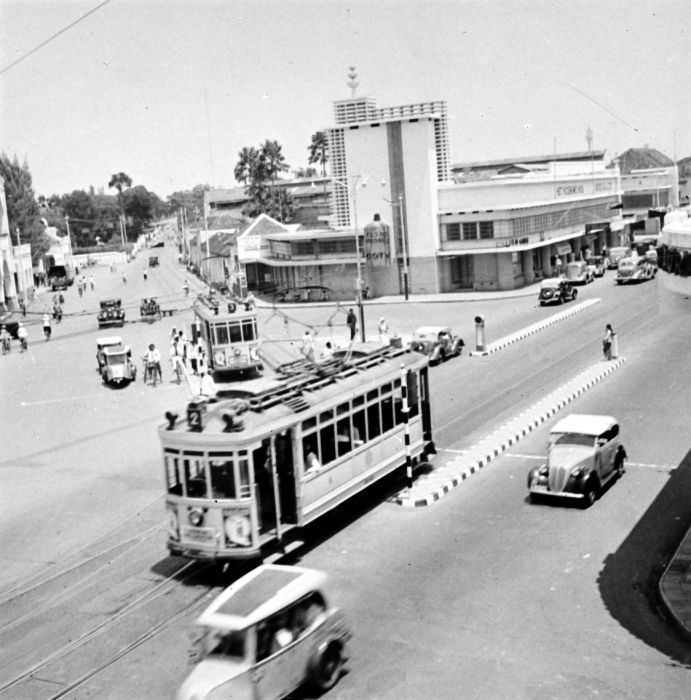
A tram crosses Tunjungan Street

Tunjungan has been known for a long time. Since the days of the Dutch East Indies, this road was designed to be a business district. Therefore, many shops, offices or hotels were built along this road and some of them are still left today.

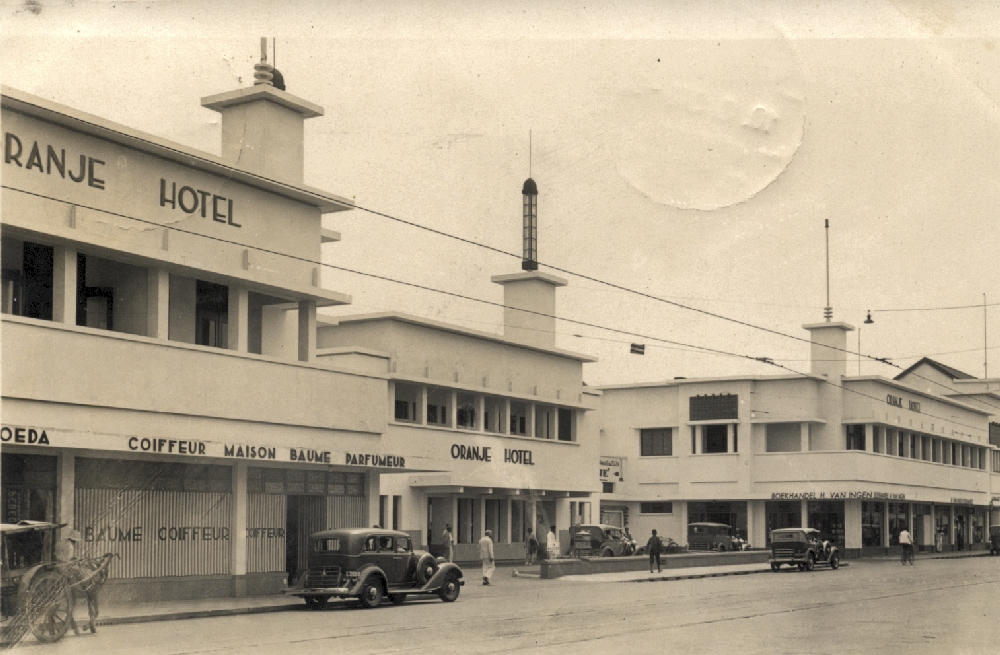
Orange Hotel in 1937 (now Hotel Majapahit)

Tunjungan, is a strategic connecting road and the golden triangle area of Jalan Embong Malang and Jalan Blauran. Besides the strategy, this road is a channel of important roads in Surabaya. For example, from the southeast, Tunjungan continues with Jalan Governor Suryo. In the south, it connects with Jalan Embong Malang. East direction of Tunjungan which is connected to Jalan Genteng Besar and Jalan Genteng Kali. To the north of Jalan Gemblongan, to the west it continues to Jalan Praban, and if it is continued, it will reach Blauran.

Tourists can enjoy the atmosphere of this city on foot, because the sidewalk on this Tunjungan Street is quite wide. Along the road there are historical buildings along the Tunjungan road. Like the Siola Building, it is a building that was founded in 1877. It was an Englishman named Robert Laidlaw who built this building and made it a wholesale and wholesale center.

Siola is the most comprehensive wholesaler under the umbrella of Whiteaway Laidlaw & Co, a world-famous wholesale trade mark at that time. Since the early 1900s, this building was the largest shopping center in the Dutch East Indies. In the next period, this place was filled with Japanese people and changed its name to the Chiyoda Shop which sells lots of luggage bags and shoes. During the battle of November 10, 1945, this building was used as a place for fighters to strategize against British troops. Great fighting was inevitable, until then the British bombed this building, destroying its front.

Only in the 1960s, this building was worked on by businessmen who later built a retail building called Siola. However, in 1998, this retail center was closed because it was unable to compete with other shopping centers. Then, this building was filled by the Ramayana Department Store and is now the Tunjungan Center.

In the 1930s, there was a shop called Nam. Located at the junction between Tunjungan and Jalan Embong Malang. Nam's shop then moved. It was only in 1938 that a new building was built called Toko Kwang. Now the place is used as the Surabaya Struggle Press Monument.

On this Tunjungan street there is also a hotel with the name Hotel Majapahit. This hotel was founded by an Armenian named Lucas Martin Sarkies, while for the architect he entrusted James Afprey from England. Lucas Martin also owns hotel chains such as the Raffles in Singapore, the Strand in Myanmar and the Eastern and Oriental in Penang.

The hotel, which was originally called Oranje during the colonial period, witnessed the history of the series of fighting on 10 November 1945. The beginning of the feud was the raising of the Dutch flag at the Yamato Hotel.

Initially, Sudirman asked the Dutch to lower the flag that was flying at the hotel which was also named Yamato. However, the Dutch ignored the warning. Even the negotiations did not reach an agreement. So, on September 18, 1945 there was a rebellion. Arek-arek Suroboyo, who had surrounded Hotel Yamato since morning, immediately tore off the blue cloth on the Dutch flag. So that the flag becomes red and white like the Indonesian flag.

Apart from shops and hotels, there is also a Hellendorn restaurant on Tunjungan. Hellendor became one of the favorite places for aristocrats and wealthy merchants to enjoy a sumptuous dinner.

== Present ==
The name of this street forms the basis for the name of the famous shopping center in Surabaya, namely Tunjungan Plaza and Hotel Tunjungan, although these two places are located between Jalan Basuki Rahmat and Jalan Embong Malang.

The historical building of Hotel Majapahit Surabaya which is now managed by Mandarin Oriental is also located on Tunjungan.
