= Butterfly house (disambiguation) =

A butterfly house is a facility for the display and breeding of butterflies.

Butterfly house may also refer to:

- Butterfly House (album), by the Coral, 2010
- Butterfly House, Missouri Botanical Garden, a butterfly zoo in Chesterfield, Missouri, US
- Butterfly House (Carmel-by-the-Sea, California), US
- Butterfly House, Singapore, formerly the last local residence with curved wings
- Janet V. Machiewitz Butterfly House, Churchville Nature Center, Bucks County, Pennsylvania, US
- McCraith House or Butterfly House, a national heritage-listed house in Victoria, Australia
