= Hotel Yamato incident =

1945 political incident in Indonesia

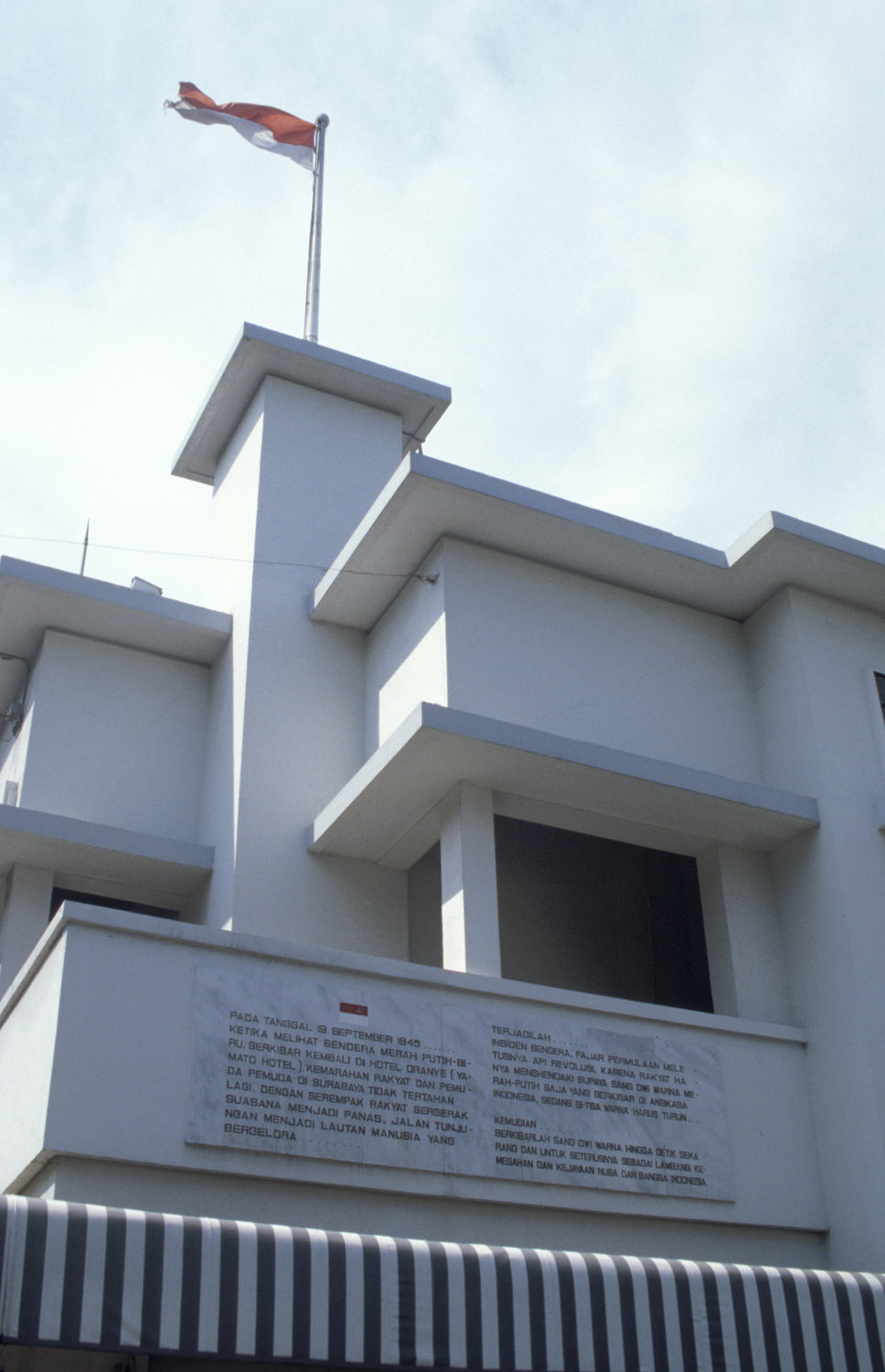
Hotel Yamato (now called Hotel Majapahit) with text commemorating the incident

The Hotel Yamato incident was the tearing of the blue colour of the Dutch flag flying at Hotel Yamato (now Hotel Majapahit) on 19 September 1945, in Surabaya, Indonesia. It was preceded by the failure of negotiations between Soedirman (Surabaya residency) and W. V. C. Ploegman, a Dutch official, to lower the Dutch flag.

== Chronology of events ==
=== Indonesian flag-raising movement ===
After the Proclamation of Indonesian Independence and the issuance of the Sukarno government edict on 31 August 1945 which stipulated that from 1 September 1945 the national flag, Sang Merah Putih, would be flown throughout Indonesia, the flag-raising movement expanded to all corners of Surabaya.

In various strategic and other places the Indonesian flag was raised. Among others, there were flag-raising acts on the upper terrace of the Karesidenan Office Building (Syucokan office, the current provincial capitol at Heroes Street) located in front of the Kempeitai building (now Heroes Monument) and on top of the Internatio Building, followed by a line of youth from all over Surabaya carrying the Indonesian flag coming to Tambaksari (Gelora 10 November Stadium) arriving at a patriotic pro-Republic rally organised by Barisan Pemuda Surabaya.

During the rally, the Tambaksari field was full of waving red and white flags accompanied by chants of 'Merdeka' shouted by the masses. The Kempeitai, who had banned the meeting, was unable to stop and disperse the mass of Surabayan people.

The climax of the flag-raising movement in Surabaya then occurred in the flag-tearing incident at Yamato Hotel (now named Majapahit Hotel) on Tunjungan Street, no. 65, Surabaya in mid-September.

=== The arrival of Allied troops ===
Initially the Japanese and Indo-Dutch who had come out of internment set up an organisation, the Social Contact Committee, which received full support from the Japanese. The formation of this committee was sponsored by the International Red Cross. However, under the cover of the Red Cross, they engaged in political activities. They tried to take over warehouses and some places they had occupied, such as the Yamato Hotel. On 18 September 1945, Allied and Dutch officers from AFNEI (Allied Forces Netherlands East Indies) arrived in Surabaya together with a Red Cross delegation from Jakarta.

The Allied group was housed by the Japanese administration in Surabaya at the Yamato Hotel located at 65 Tunjungan Street, while the Intercross group was located at the Setan Building located at no.80 Tunjungan Street, both without the permission of the pro-Jakarta government of the Surabaya Residency. And since then Yamato Hotel was used as the headquarters of the Recovery of Allied Prisoners of War and Internees (RAPWI) operation.

=== Raising the Dutch flag ===
A group of Dutch people under the leadership of W. V. C. Ploegman on the evening of 19 September 1945, at 21.00, raised the Dutch flag, without the consent of the Surabaya Residency Government (which was pro-Jakarta), on the top level of the Yamato Hotel, on the north side of it, to mark the birthday of Queen Wilhelmina, in an open defiance of the 1 September order from the capital. The next day, the 20th, many of the Surabayan Pemuda (Youth) saw the Dutch flag hoisted and became angry because they considered that the Dutch had insulted Indonesian sovereignty, wanted to restore power back in Indonesia, and harassed the Red and White flag-raising movement that was taking place in Surabaya.

=== The failure of Sudirman and Ploegman's negotiation ===
After the gathering of the masses, Soedirman, who was the Surabaya Regional Resident of the Indonesian Government who at that time served as Deputy Resident (Fuku Shuchou Gunseikan) who was still recognised by the Dai Nippon Surabaya Shu government, came through the crowd and entered the Yamato hotel escorted by Sidik and Hariyono. As a representative of Indonesia, he conferred with Ploegman and his friends and requested that the Dutch flag be immediately lowered from the Yamato Hotel building. Ploegman refused to lower the Dutch flag and refused to recognise Indonesian sovereignty. The negotiations became heated, Ploegman pulled out a pistol, and a fight broke out in the negotiation room. Ploegman was strangled to death by Sidik, who was later killed by a Dutch soldier on guard who heard Ploegman's gun, while Sudirman and Hariyono fled outside Hotel Yamato.

=== Tearing of the Dutch Flag ===
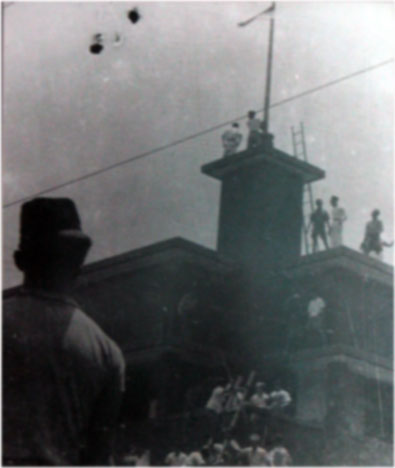
The raising of the Indonesian flag after the Dutch flag was torn from its blue colours at the Yamato hotel

The Dutch flag turned into the Indonesian flag by removal of the blue stripe prior to the Battle of Surabaya in 1945.

Outside the hotel, the youths who knew about the breakdown of the negotiations immediately broke into the Yamato Hotel and a fight broke out in the hotel lobby. Some of the youths scrambled up to the top of the hotel to take down the Dutch flag. Hariyono, who had been with Sudirman, returned to the hotel and became involved in climbing the flagpole and together with Kusno Wibowo managed to lower the Dutch flag, tear off the blue part, and hoist it to the top of the pole again. This was greeted by the crowd below the hotel with repeated chants of 'Merdeka'.

== The role of events in the Indonesian War of Independence ==
After the incident at the Yamato Hotel, on 27 October 1945, the first battle between Indonesia and the AFNEI troops erupted. The small attacks turned into a generalised attack that claimed many casualties both in the Indonesian and British military as well as civilians on the Indonesian side. Eventually Major General D.C. Hawthorn (the commander of the 23rd British Indian Division) asked President Sukarno for help to defuse the situation and call a ceasefire. The ceasefire failed and coupled with the death of Brigadier General Mallaby, resulted in the issuance of the 10 November ultimatum by the British, which sparked, in the history of the Indonesian National Revolution, a chain of events that led to the historic Republican resistance in the Battle of Surabaya. To commemorate it, the date of the event was designated as Heroes' Day.

== Legacy ==
Every year on September 19, the day of the incident, is marked as a working holiday in Surabaya and a city organized theatrical performance is held on that day on the grounds what is now today Hotel Majapahit, where a marker stands below the flagpole in remembrance of said event.

== See also ==
- 10 November Incident
- Flag of Indonesia
- Flag of the Netherlands
