= Black and white bungalow =

Black and white bungalows are white-painted bungalows, in a style once commonly used to house European colonial and expatriate families in tropical climate colonies, typically the Southeast Asian colonies of the British Empire in the nineteenth century. The term 'black and white' refers to the dark timber beams and whitewashed walls usually found in these buildings.

Such houses typically have a pitched roof with wide overhanging eaves due to the rainy tropical condition, and the high roof also allows for good ventilation that draws in cooling air. The ground floor is generally open and spacious, often tiled for coolness. The building may have large verandahs, and some have elevated foundations similar to that of a traditional Malay house. Only about 600 of these bungalows remain on the island of Singapore.

== History ==
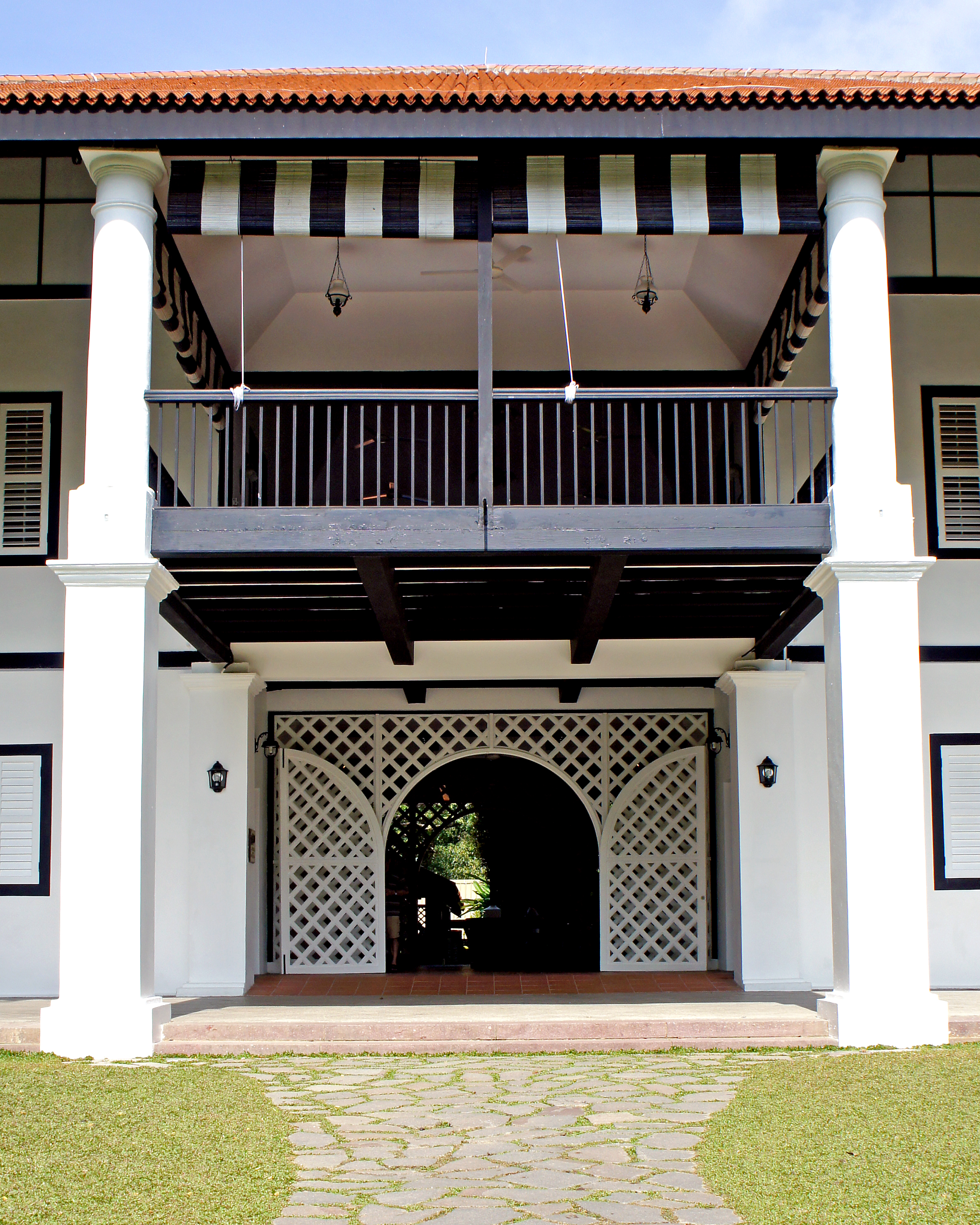
Burkill Hall in Singapore Botanic Gardens, the oldest surviving 19th century Anglo-Malay Plantation building, forerunner to the black and white bungalow

In Malaysia and Singapore, bungalows such as these were built from the 19th century until World War II for the wealthy expatriate families, the leading commercial firm as well as the Public Works Department and the British Armed Forces. This style of houses adopted elements of the British Tudorbethan, Arts and Crafts movement and later Art Deco designs but adapted to suit the tropical environment of these countries as well as providing for an airy and spacious family home. Its popularity in the early 20th century has been attributed to Regent Alfred John Bidwell. His design for W. Patchitt House at Cluny Road in 1903 spurred on a trend for building houses in such style, which peaked in popularity just after the First World War.

Most of these houses were built within a short span of around 25 years between 1903–1928. There was brief resurgence in such buildings just before the Second World War, due to a need to accommodate an increase in military personnel in Singapore.

=== Atbara house ===
The Atbara House is one of the many remaining black and white houses unique to Singapore. It is the previous French embassy to Singapore, built in 1898 by Regent Alfred John Bidwell. The Atbara house was used for colonial management, unlike other Black and White Houses which were mostly used to house European colonial and wealthy expatriate families or for military purposes. The Atbara House consists of a strong mixture of indigenous Indian and Malay vernacular design mixed with roof and construction methods adapted from colonial source.

== Present day ==
Large numbers of these colonial era mansions were built but many have since been demolished due to the need for space for modern developments. Around 600 of these houses remain in Singapore, many of these are owned by the government but leased for private uses, often to the expatriate communities. Many of these still serve as residences and, with some have been renovated and converted into commercial buildings such as restaurants and bars.

== Cultural references ==
The Black and White Singaporean House is referred to in Kevin Kwan's 2013 satiric novel, Crazy Rich Asians.
