= Hotel Majapahit =

Coordinates: 7°15′35″S 112°44′23″E

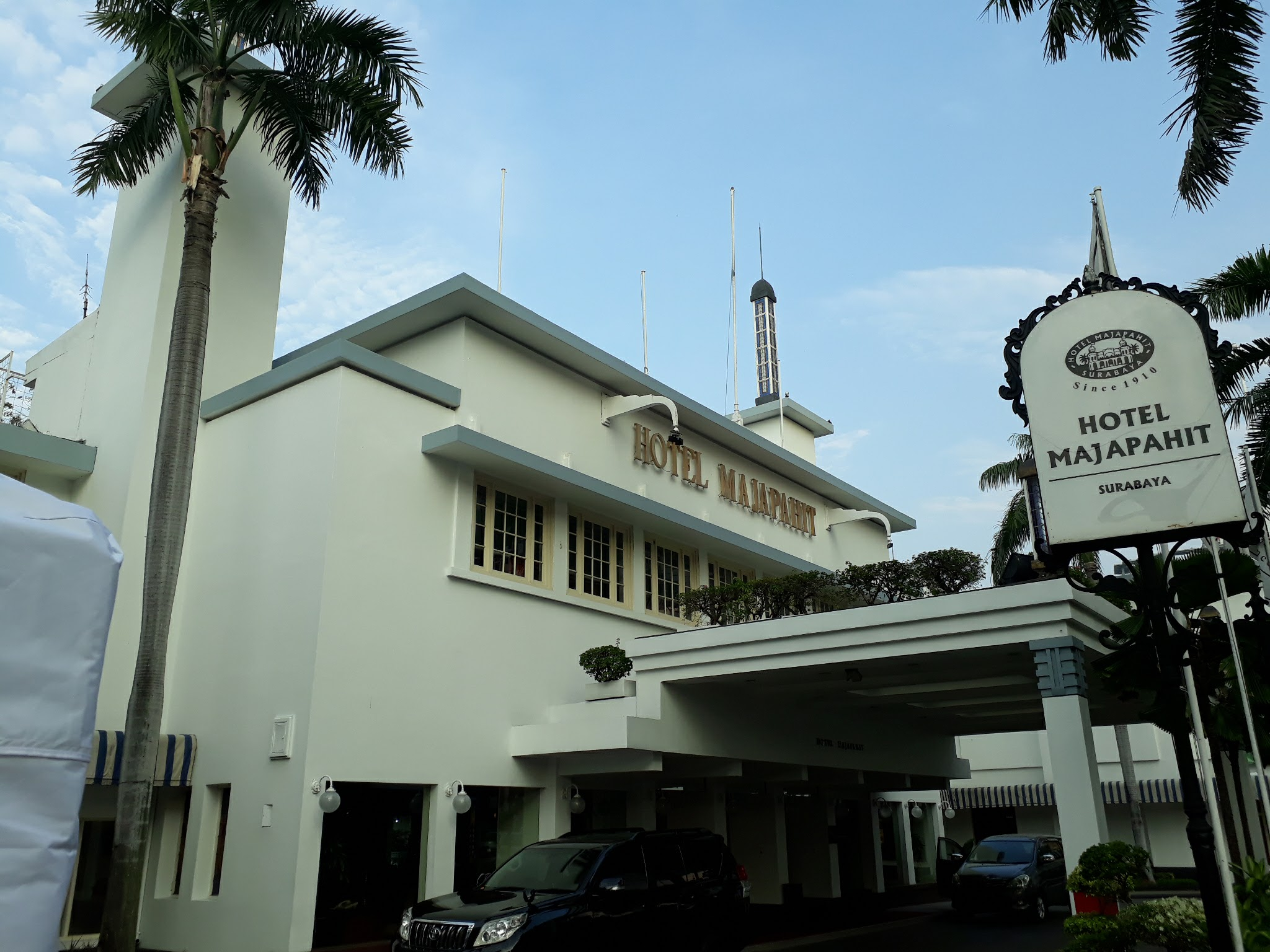
- The Hotel Majapahit
- Interactive map of Hotel Majapahit
- Type: Hotel
- Location: Surabaya, East Java, Indonesia

History
- Built: 1911

Site notes
- Architect: Regent Alfred John Bidwell
- Architectural style: Art deco
- Owner: CCM Group

The Hotel Majapahit is a historic hotel in Surabaya, East Java, Indonesia, opened in 1911. The hotel is currently managed by Accor through its MGallery chain.

== History ==
The hotel was founded in 1910 as the Hotel Oranje by Lucas Martin Sarkies, the son of Martin Sarkies of the Sarkies brothers, who commissioned Regent Alfred John Bidwell to design the hotel. It opened on 1 July 1911. Two wings were added from 1923 to 1926 and an Art Deco lobby extension was opened in 1930. The opening was celebrated with a royal party attended by Crown Prince Leopold III from Belgium, Princess Astrid from Sweden and Charlie Chaplin.

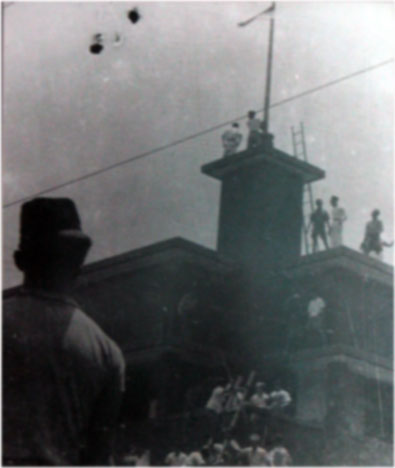
November 1945 : young Indonesian revolutionaries tear off the blue part of the Dutch flag

During the WWII Japanese occupation of the Dutch East Indies from 1942 to 1945, the hotel was renamed Hotel Yamato. It was used as the headquarters of the Japanese forces in East Java. The hotel was the site of the famous "Hotel Yamato Incident" on 19 September 1945 when pro-nationalist Indonesian youth revolutionaries tore away the blue portion of the Dutch flag flown above the hotel to change it to the red-and-white Indonesian flag in the lead-up to the Battle of Surabaya. Following this incident, the hotel was renamed the Hotel Merdeka (Independence Hotel).

In 1946 the Sarkies family returned to manage the hotel and renamed it the L. M. S. Hotel for Lucas Martin Sarkies. In 1969, Mantrust Holdings Co. bought the hotel and renamed it Hotel Majapahit, after the historic kingdom of Majapahit. The hotel was restored in 1994 by Harry Susilo, a prominent local ethnic Chinese businessman, at a cost of $51 million. It reopened on 19 January 1996 as the Mandarin Oriental Hotel Majapahit Surabaya, managed by the Mandarin Oriental Hotel Group. It was bought by the CCM Group in 2006 and renamed Hotel Majapahit.

In 2014, Hotel Majapahit was officially recognized as a cultural heritage landmark by the Ministry of Education and Culture. Accor assumed management in 2017, and the hotel was placed in their MGallery boutique division as Majapahit Hotel Surabaya - MGallery Collection.

== Gallery ==
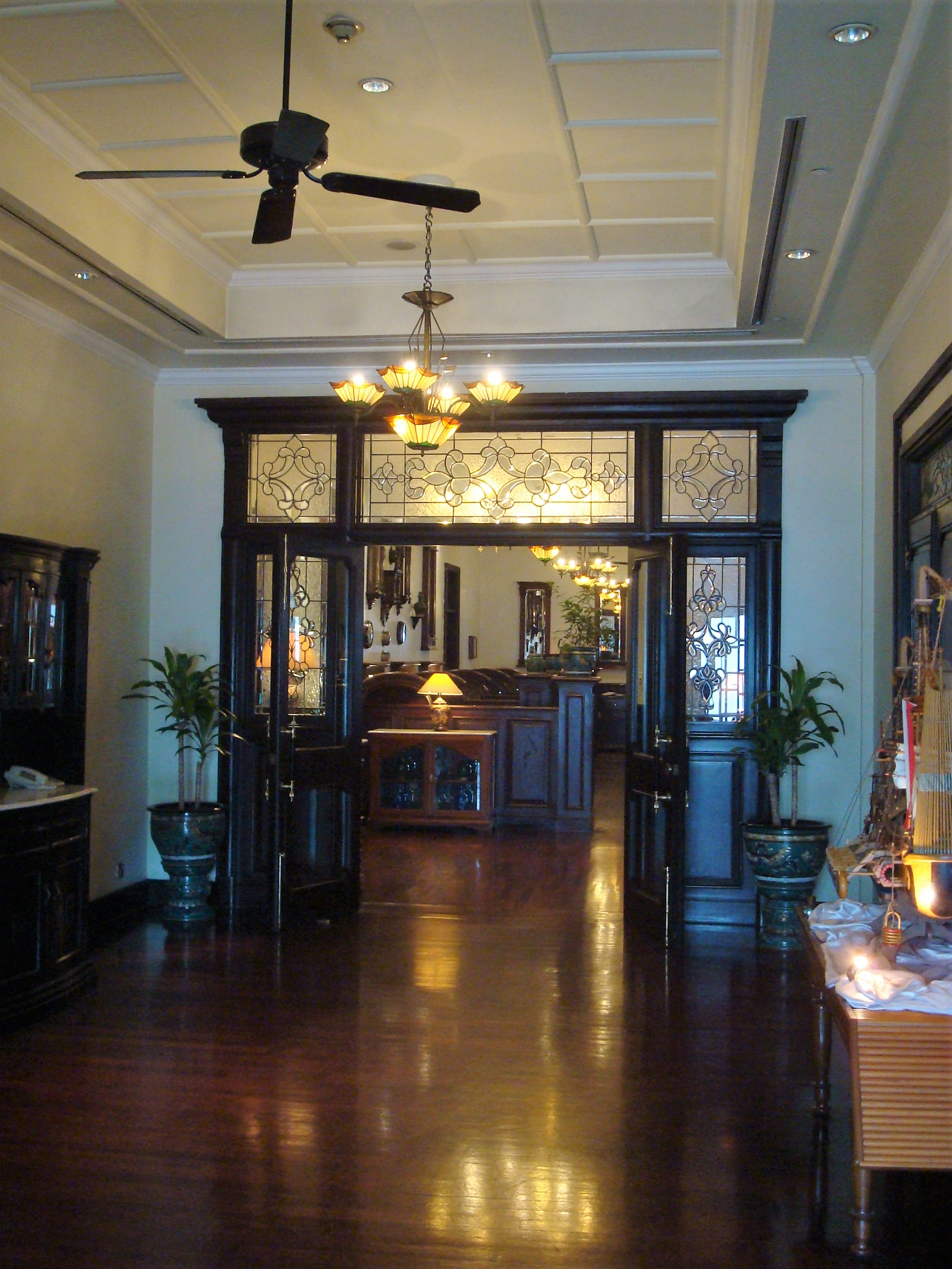

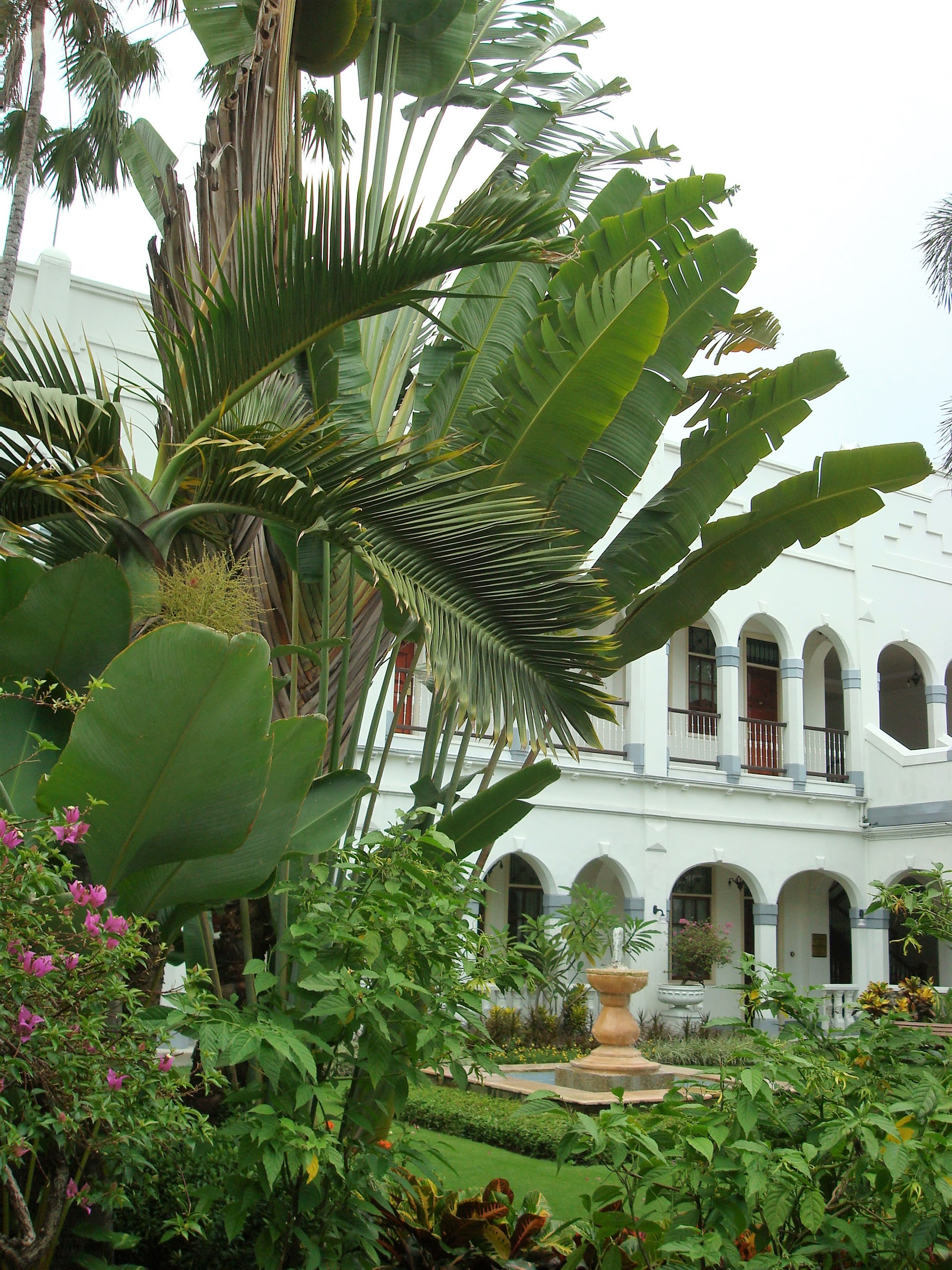

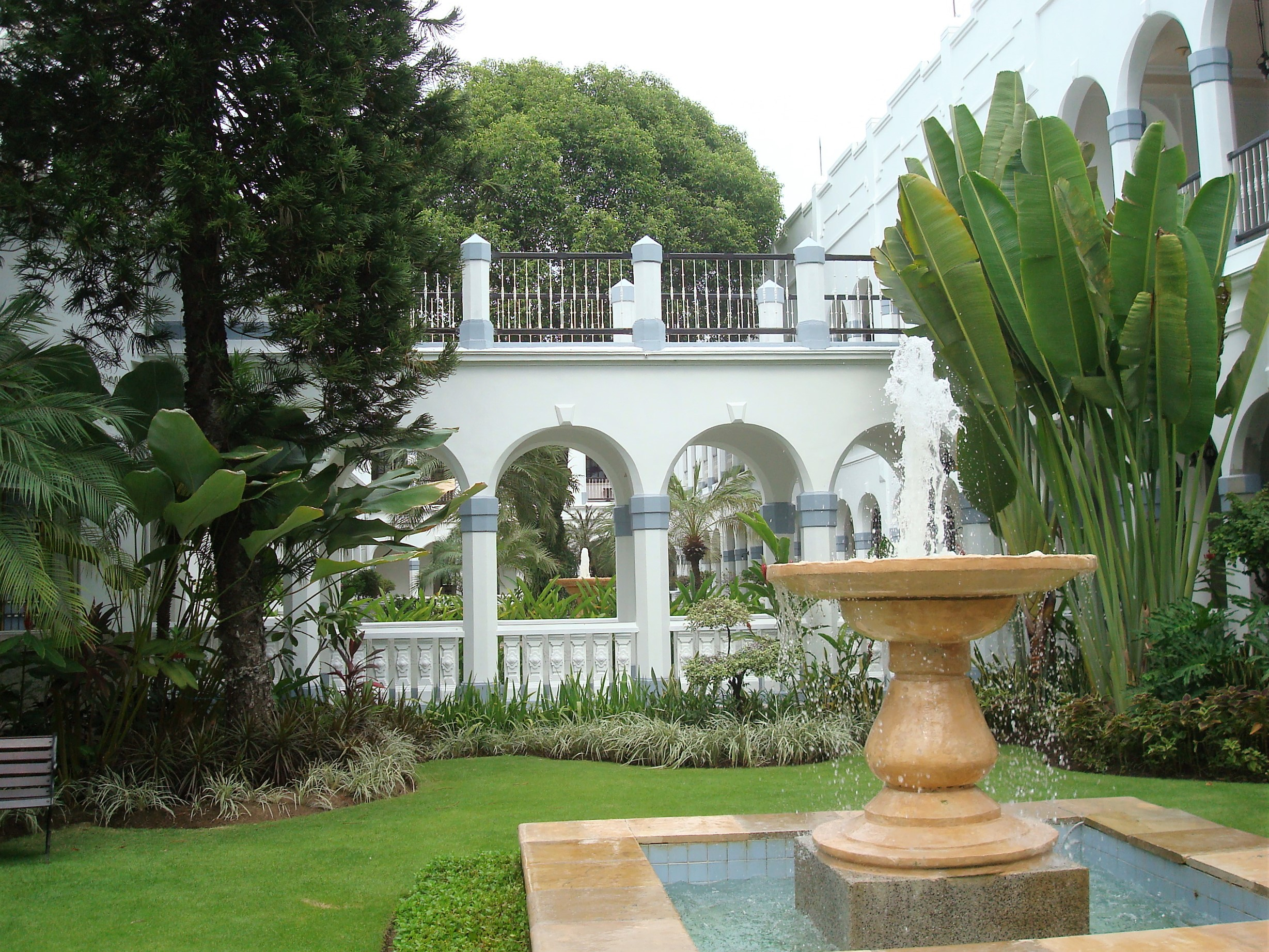

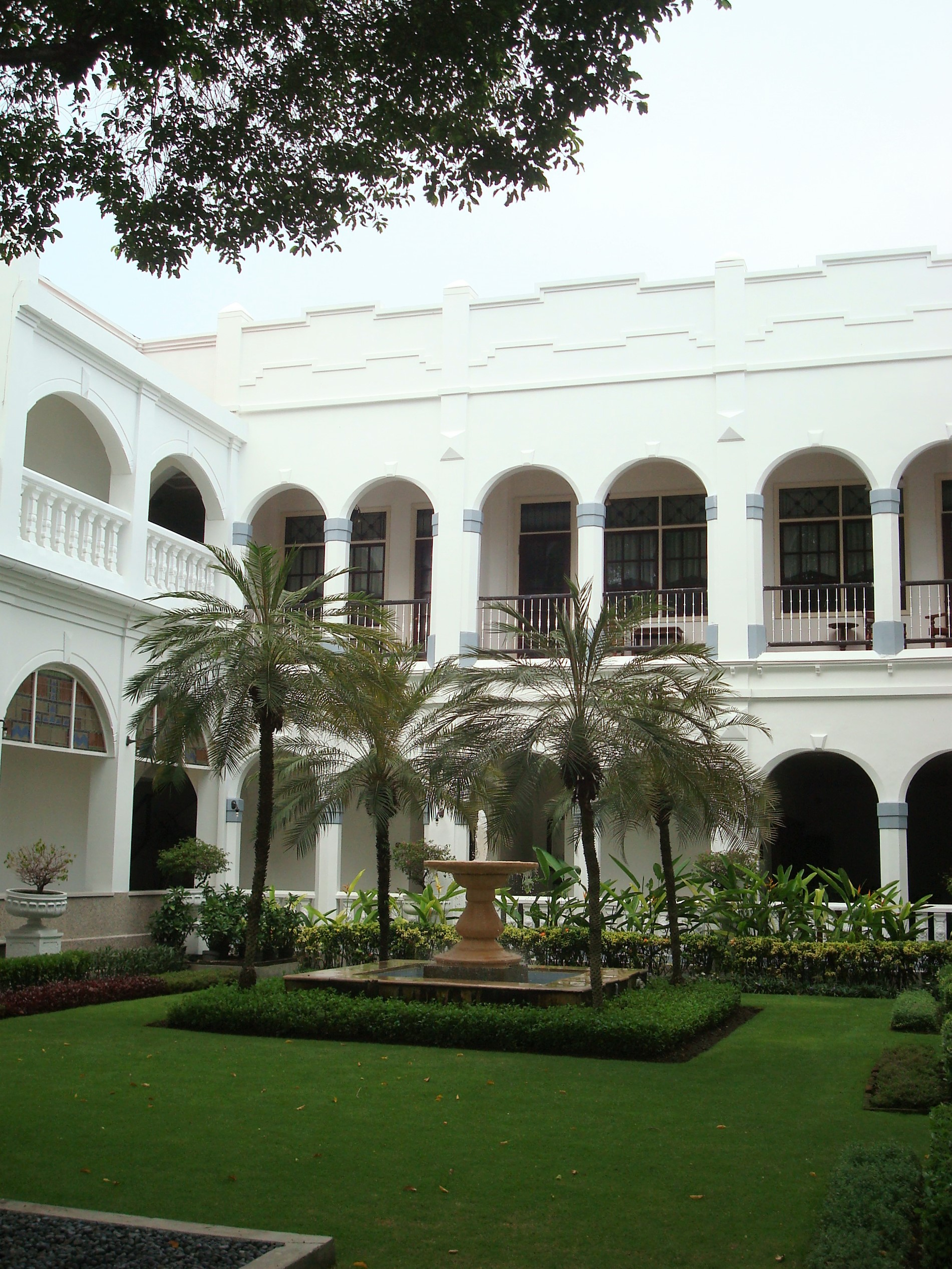

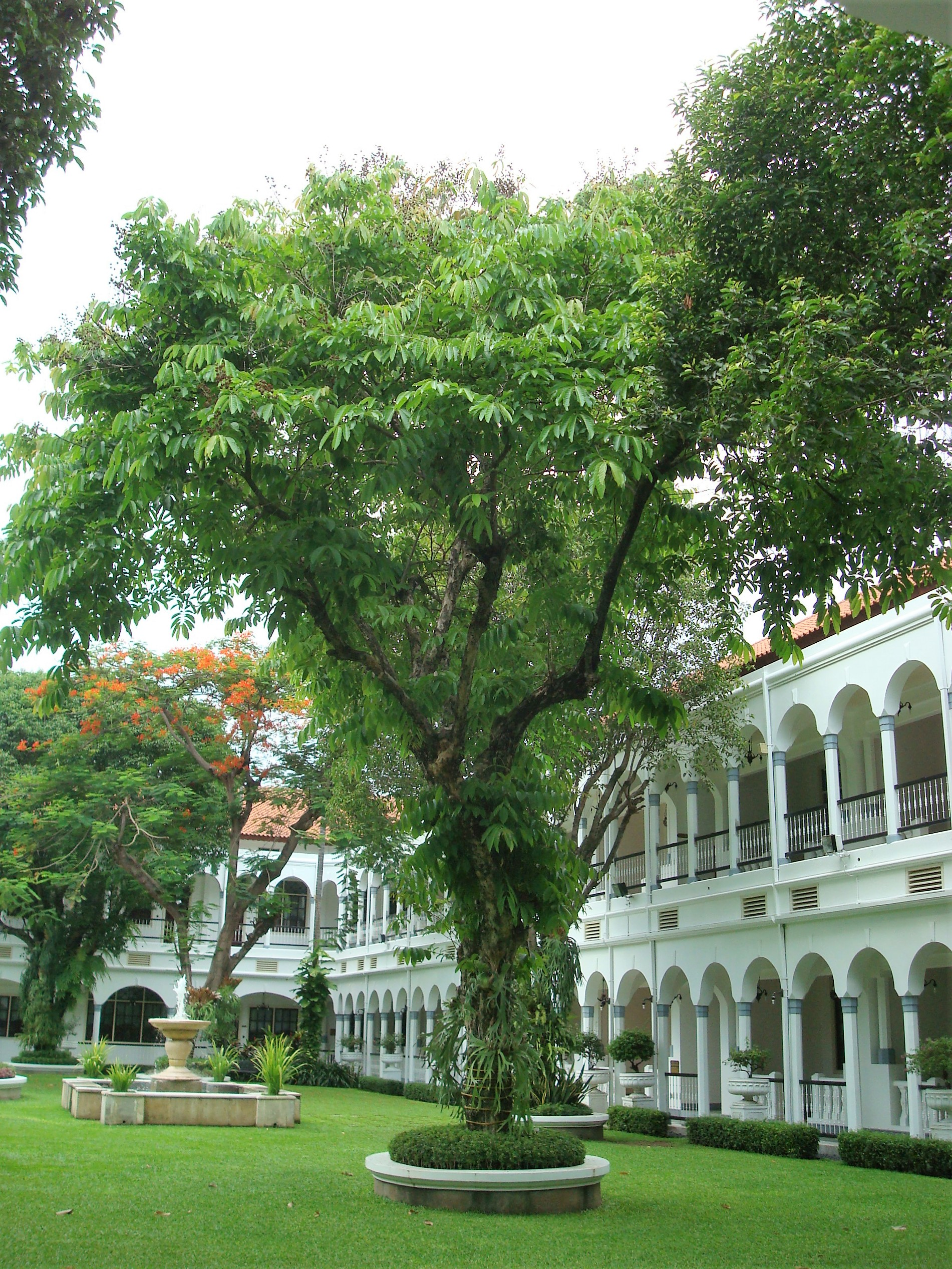

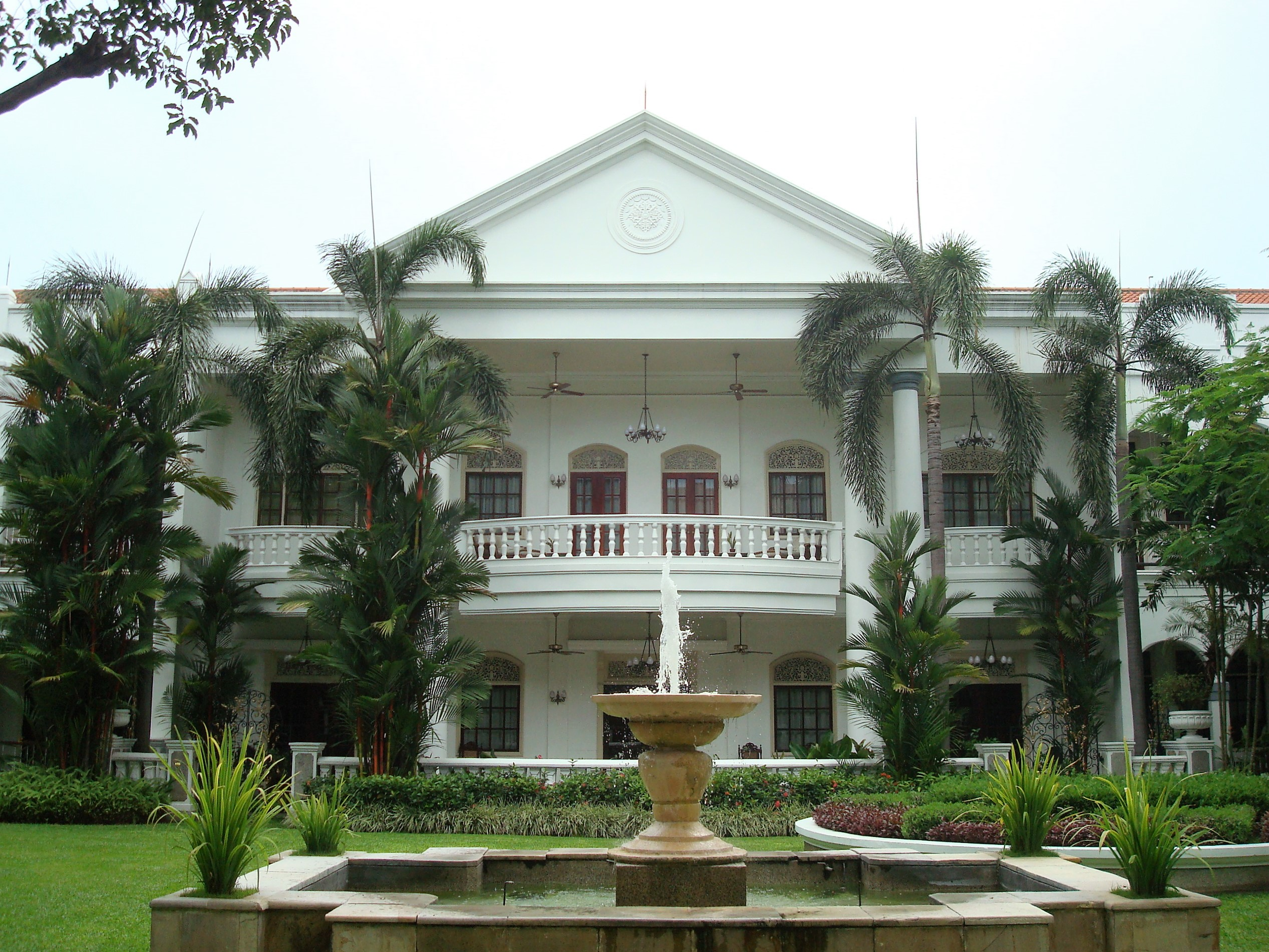

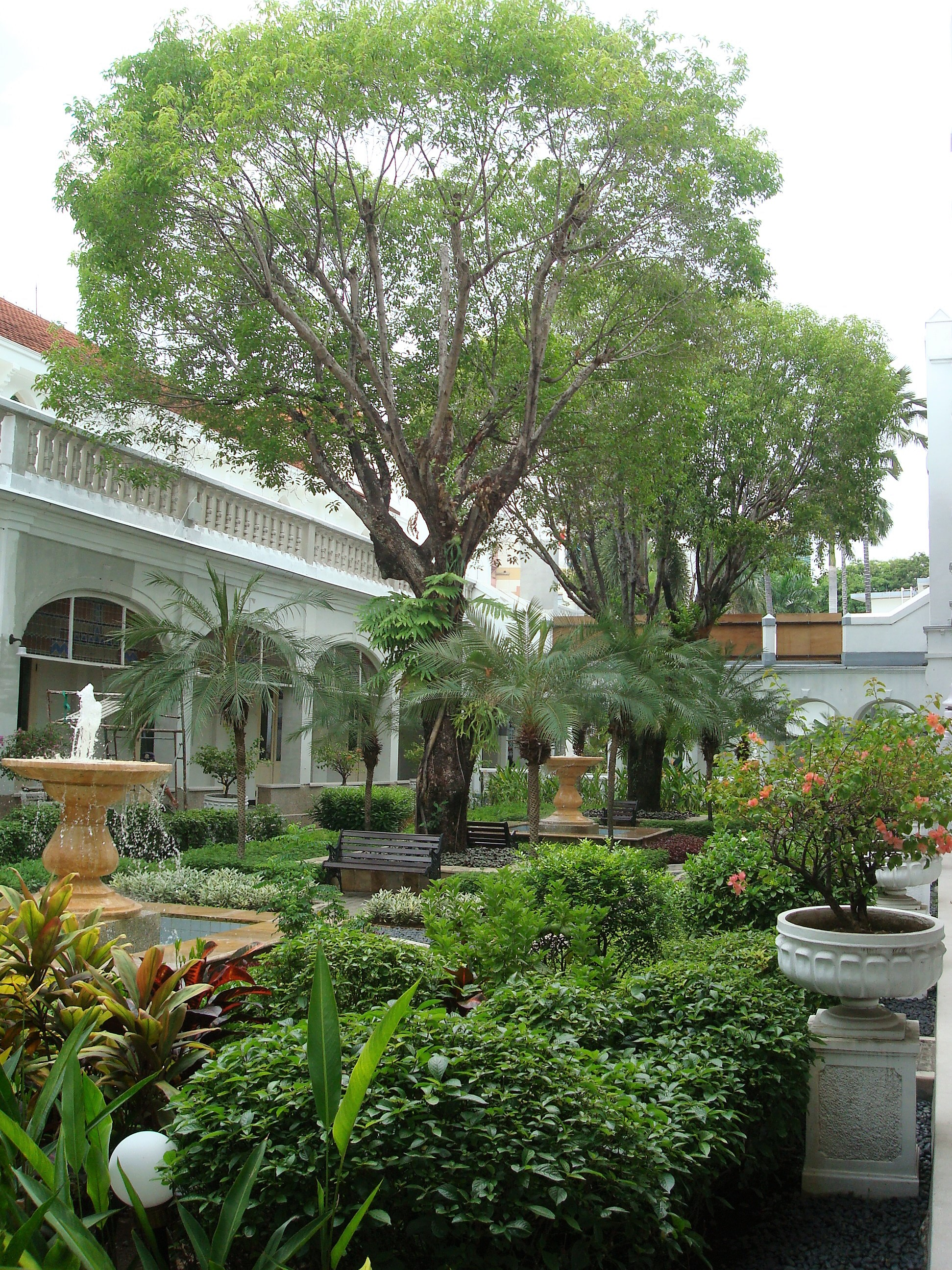

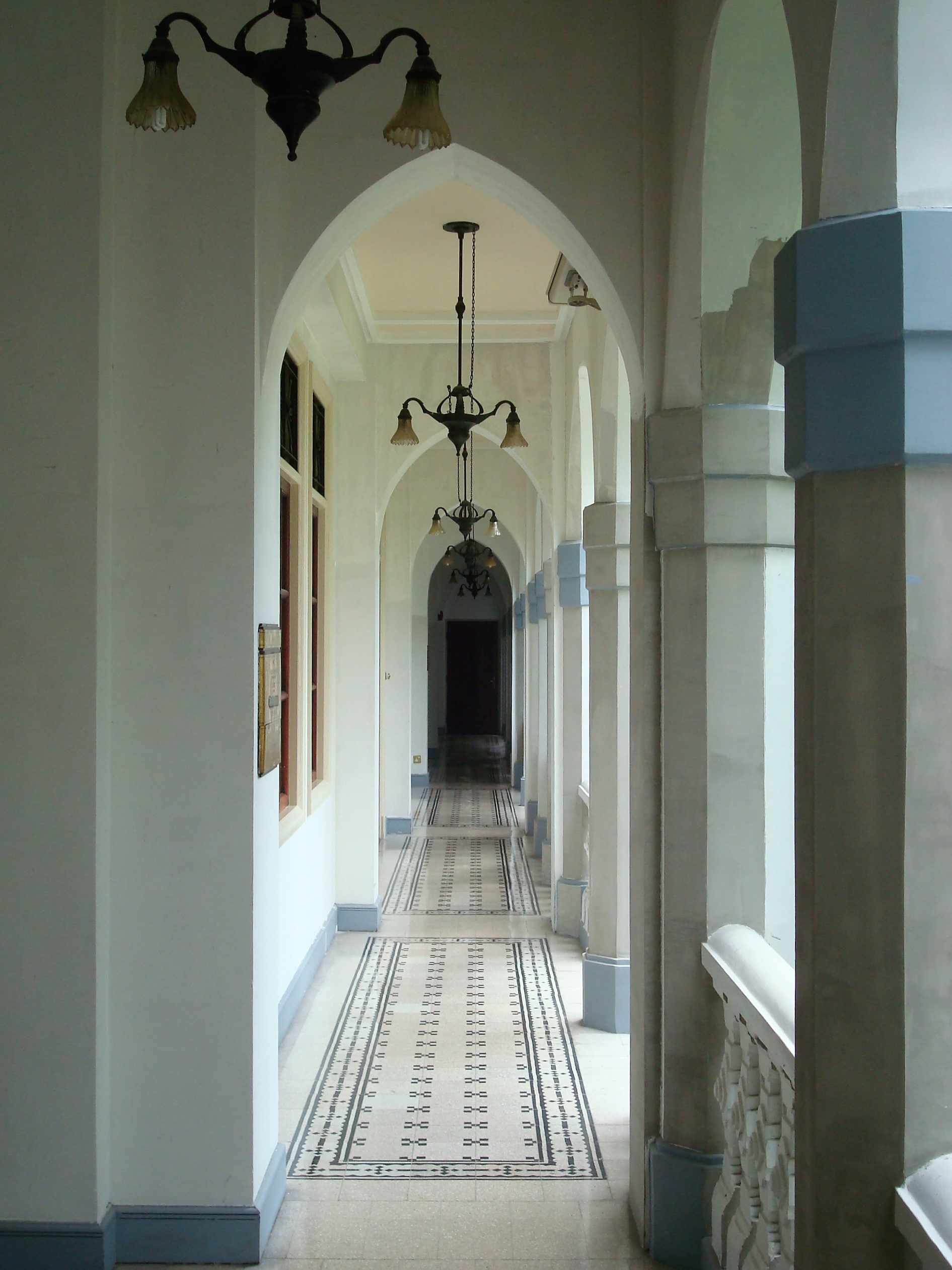

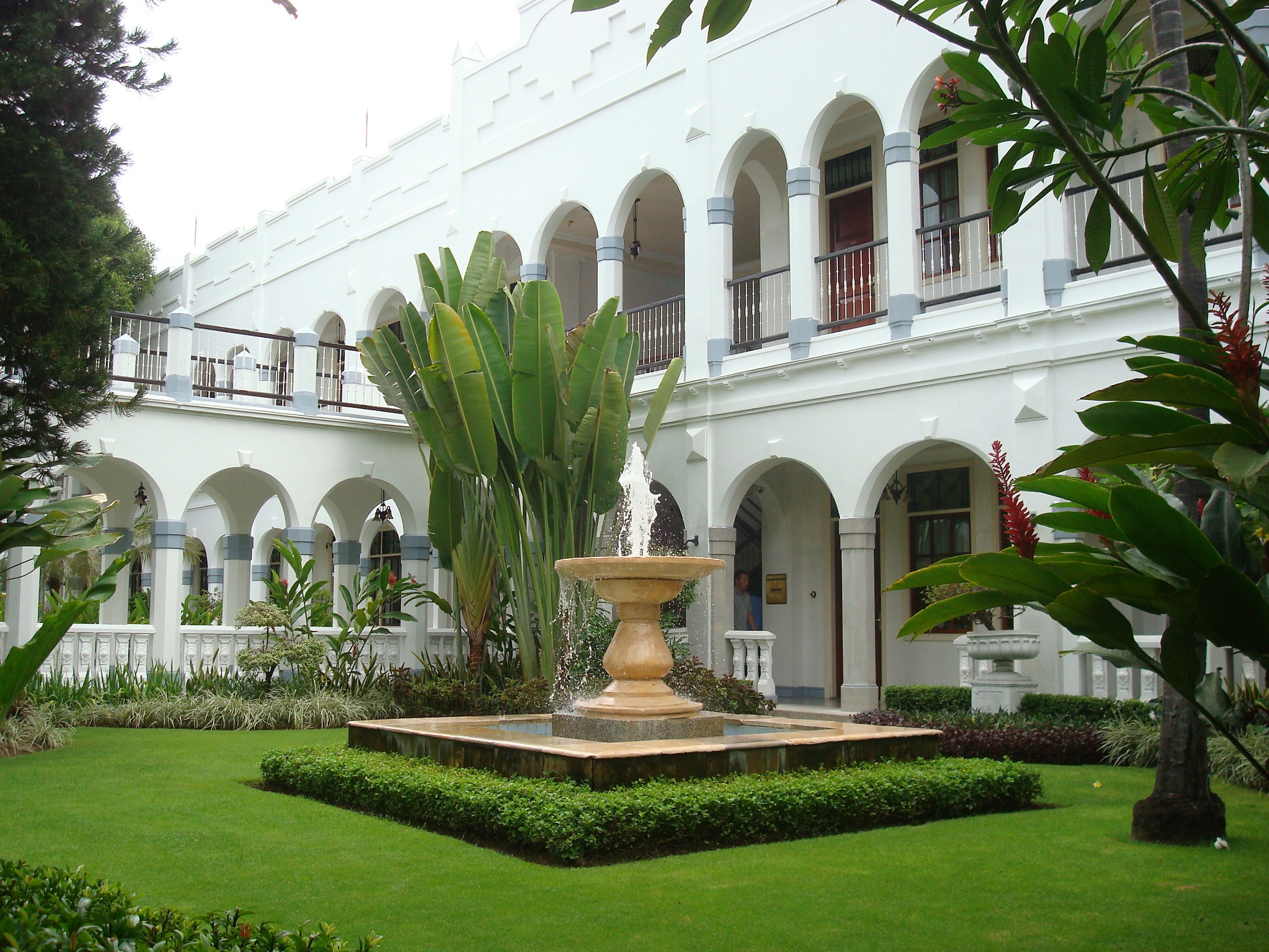
