= Regent Alfred John Bidwell =

English-born Singaporean architect (1869–1918)

Regent Alfred John Bidwell (R. A. J. Bidwell)
- Born: Regent Alfred John Bidwell; 12 June 1869
- Died: 6 April 1918 (aged 48); Tanjong Katong, Singapore
- Occupation: Architect
- Spouse: Edith Allen (d. 1944)

Regent Alfred John Bidwell (12 June 1869 – 6 April 1918), also known as R. A. J. Bidwell, was an English-born architect noted for his colonial era buildings in Singapore. His best-known works include the Raffles Hotel and the Victoria Theatre and Concert Hall in Singapore and Sultan Abdul Samad Building in Kuala Lumpur.

== Early life ==
Regent Alfred John Bidwell was born in 1869. He received his architectural training with Lockyer, Son, & Cox, of London, and he became a member of the Architectural Association, and was placed on the honours list of this institution for design.

== Career ==
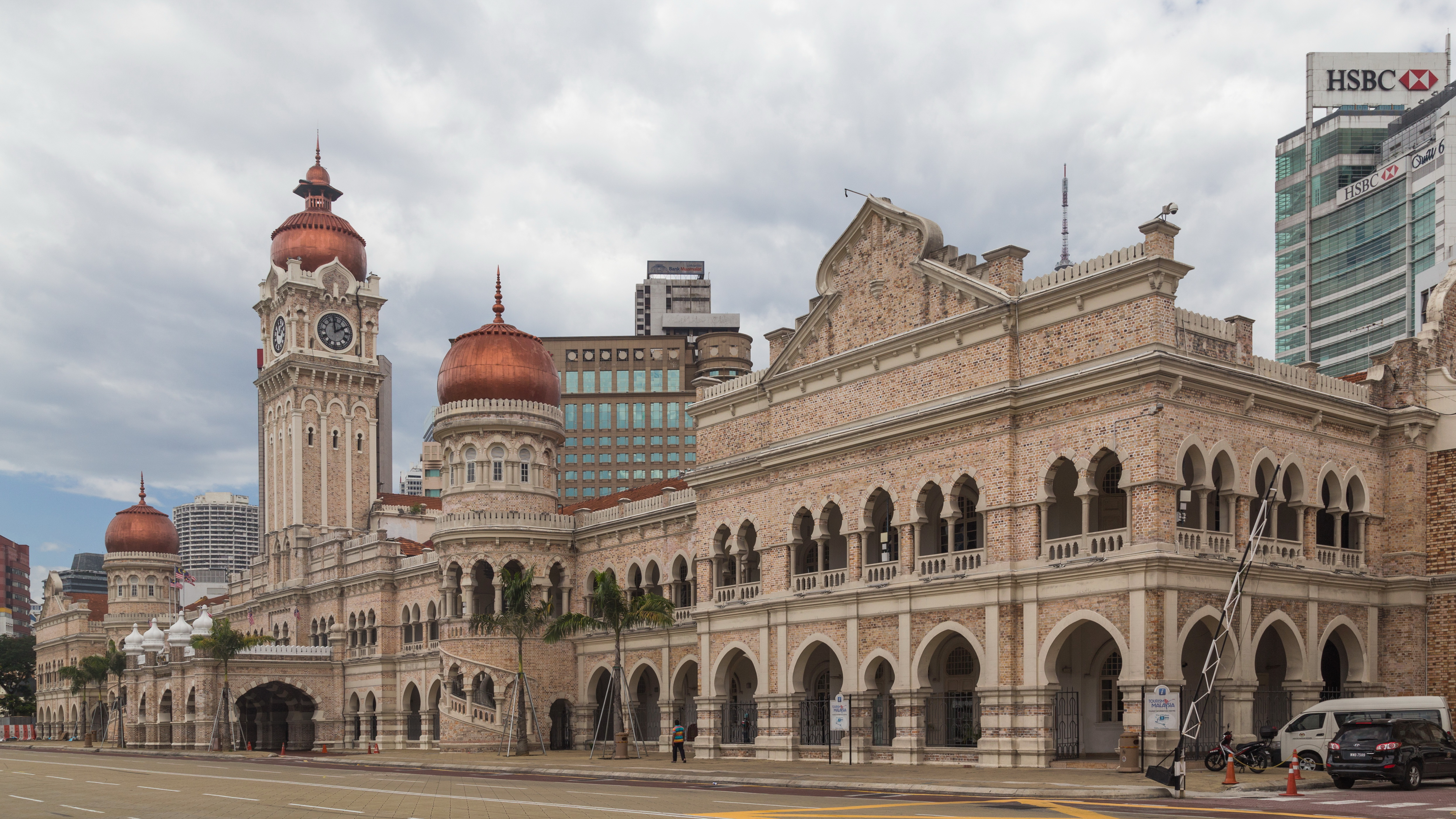
Sultan Abdul Samad Building, first major work by Bidwell

Bidwell started work as an assistant to a succession of architects: Crikmay & Son, W. H. Woodroffe of London, and the superintending architect of the London County Council. In 1893 Bidwell left England to go to Malaya after he was nominated for appointment by Sir Charles Gregory to work for the Public Works Department (PWD) of Selangor.

Bidwell was involved in the design of Kuala Lumpur's public buildings and other works, the most important of which is the Sultan Abdul Samad Building. The building was originally designed by A.C. Norman who drew the ground plan with Bidwell designing the elevation in a Classic Renaissance style. However, the State Engineer of Selangor PWD Charles Edwin Spooner disliked the design, and he instructed Bidwell to rework the building in an Indo-Saracenic or Neo-Mughal on Norman's ground plan. Although the building is formally credited to A.C. Norman (and only his name appears on the foundation stone as the architect), the actual appearance of the building is largely the work of R. A. J. Bidwell with contributions from A. B. Hubback who also worked on the building after Bidwell left.

=== Work in Singapore ===
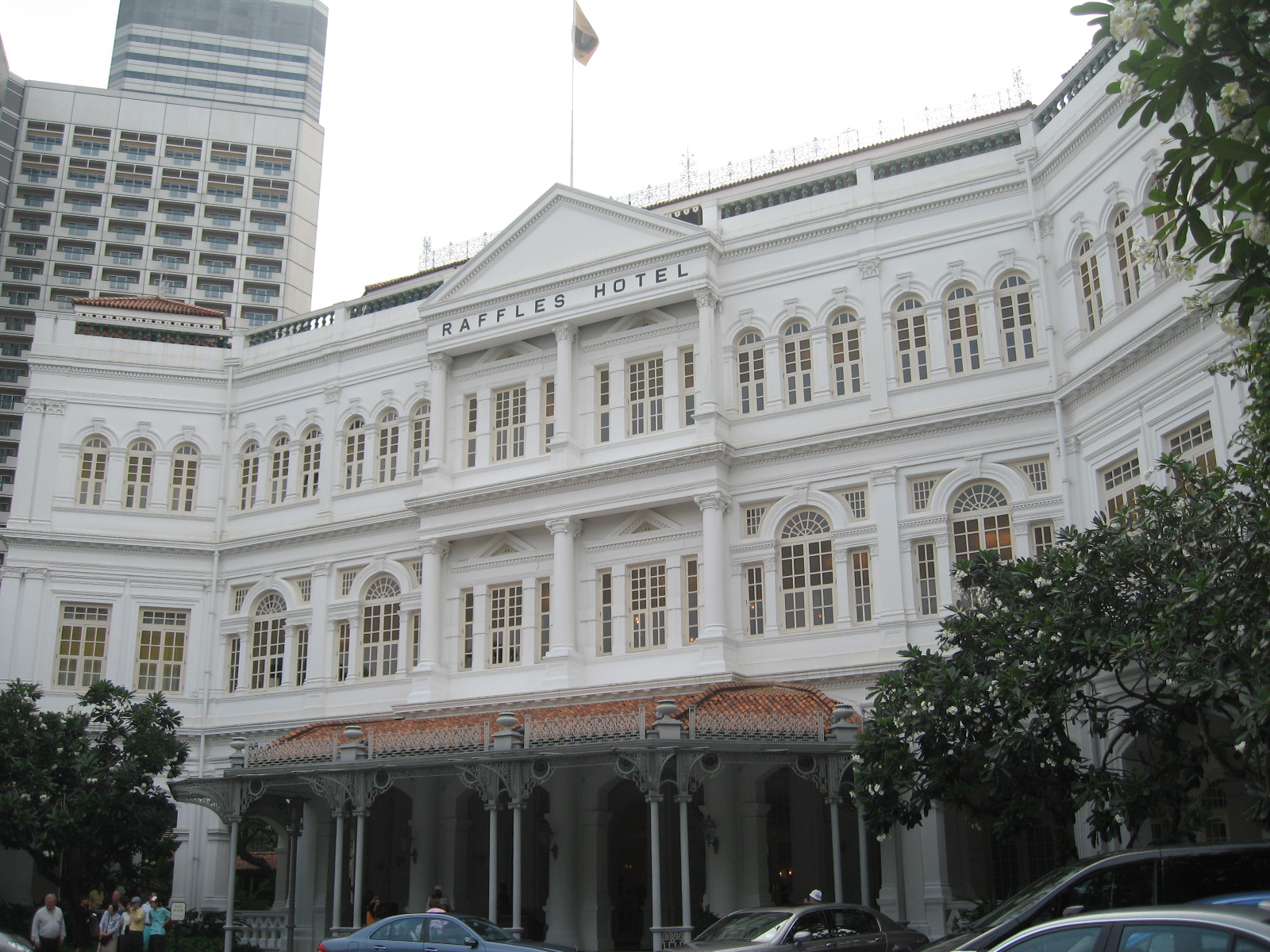
Raffles Hotel

In April 1895, Bidwell resigned from the Selangor PWD to join Swan and Maclaren in Singapore. He became a partner of the firm in 1899, and Bidwell designed most of the buildings by Swan and Maclaren during his time at the firm. In 1903 he was elected a fellow of the Surveyors' Institute.

Bidwell designed some of the most significant colonial-era buildings of Singapore such as the Raffles Hotel.

He also helped develop a style of building termed Black and White House which is an adaptation of the traditional English homes that show influences from the Tudorbethan style and Arts and Crafts movement to suit a tropical environment. His design for W. Patchitt House at Cluny Road in 1903 started a trend for building such houses.

Bidwell ceased to be a partner of Swan and Maclaren by 1915, but continued to practice for a few more years. He died on 6 April 1918 in Tanjong Katong after a period of illness.

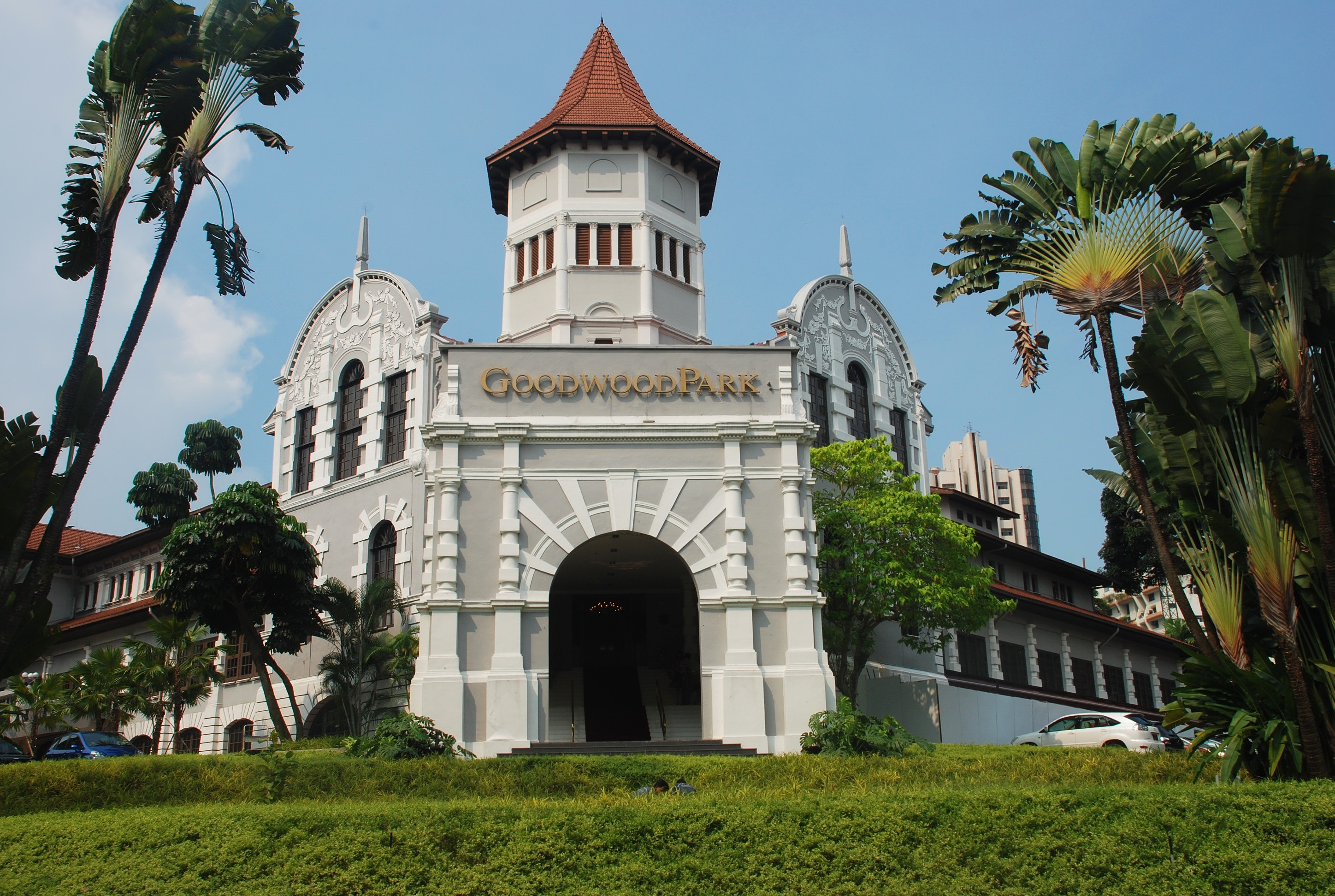
Tower Block of the Goodwood Park Hotel

== Notable works ==
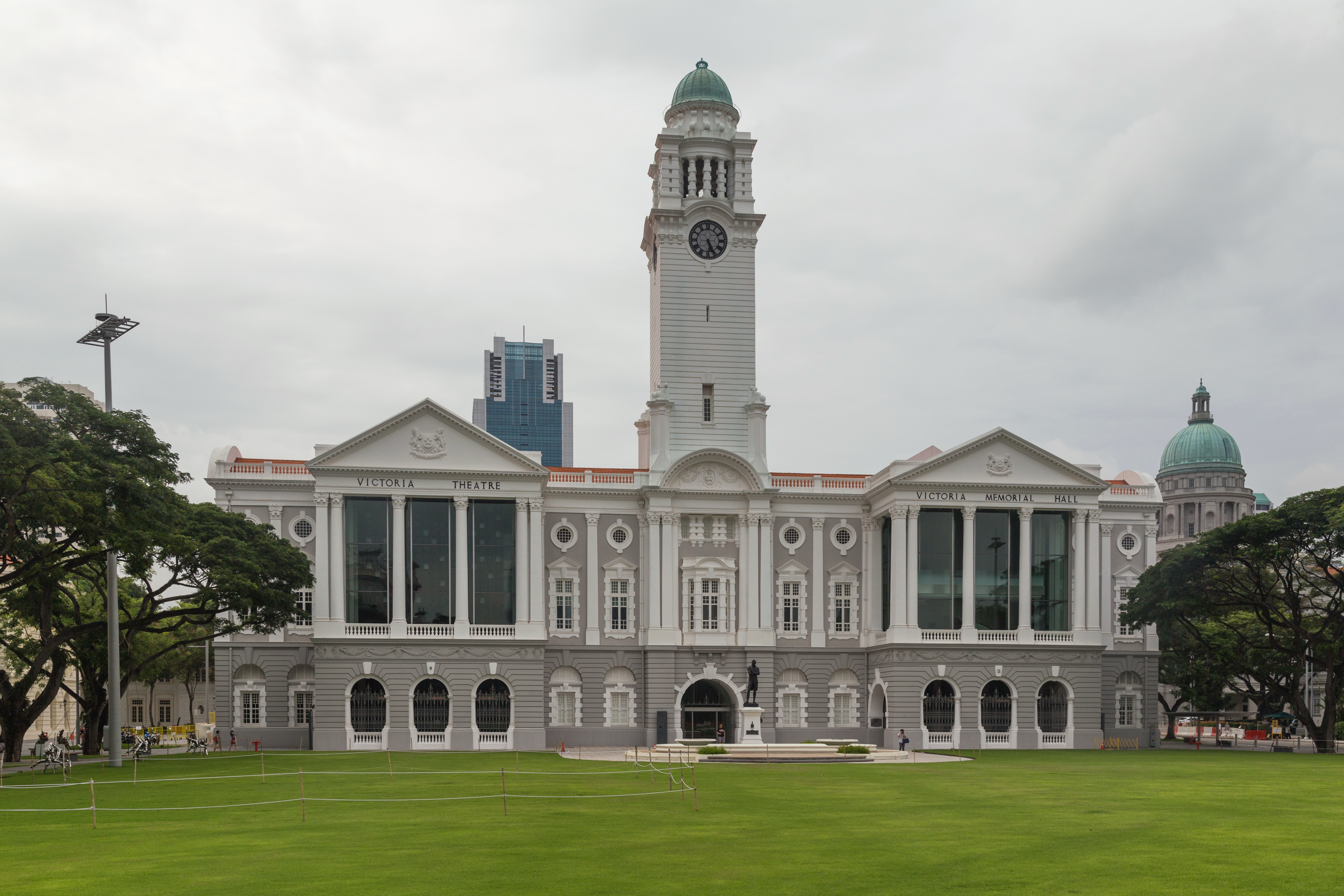
Bidwell worked on the facade of Victoria Theatre and Concert Hall

- Sultan Abdul Samad Building, Kuala Lumpur, Malaysia (1897), formally credited to A.C. Norman but much of the design is Bidwell's.
- Atbara House, Singapore (1898), an early Black and White House
- Raffles Hotel, Singapore (1899)
- Goodwood Park Hotel, Singapore (1900)
- Stamford House, Singapore (1904)
- Eden Hall, Singapore (1904)
- Chesed-El Synagogue, Singapore (1905)
- Singapore Cricket Club (1907), Bidwell designed the extension that projected out from the main clubhouse in two sections facing the pitch.
- Telephone House, Hill Street (1907), the only building of Bidwell in Singapore designed primarily in the Indo-Saracenic style.
- Victoria Theatre and Concert Hall, Singapore (1909), renovation of Town Hall (Victoria Theatre) to harmonise with Victoria Memorial Hall.
- Hotel Majapahit, Surabaya, Indonesia (1911)
- Butterfly House, Singapore (1912)
